= West Baffin Eskimo Cooperative =

Inuit artists' co-operative

Coordinates: 64°13′54″N 76°32′25″W

- Type: Cooperative
- Industry: Inuit art
- Founded: 1959; 67 years ago
- Founder: James Houston and Kananginak Pootoogook
- Headquarters: Kinngait, Canada
- Parent: Arctic Co-operatives Limited
- Website: www.westbaffin.com

The West Baffin Eskimo Cooperative, also known as the Kinngait Co-operative, is an Inuit co-operative in Kinngait, Nunavut best known for its activities in buying, producing and selling Inuit artworks. The co-operative is part of Arctic Co-operatives Limited, a group of locally owned businesses that provide fundamental services in the Canadian north. The co-operative sets prices for the sale of its member's works, pays the artists in advance and shares its profits with its members.

The co-operative was established in 1959 by James Houston and Kananginak Pootoogook as an effort to encourage art making as an income stream for local residents. Since 1959 it has purchased over 100,000 artworks from local artists and overseen the production of an annual edition of 50 prints by Kinngait artists.

The co-operative's Kinngait operations and its printmaking studio, Kinngait Studios, are housed within the Kenojuak Cultural Centre and Print Shop, named for Kenojuak Ashevak, a leading figure of modern Inuit art. The co-operative also operates Dorset Fine Arts, a commercial art gallery in Toronto, Ontario that is responsible for marketing and sale of art produced by the co-operative's members.

== History ==
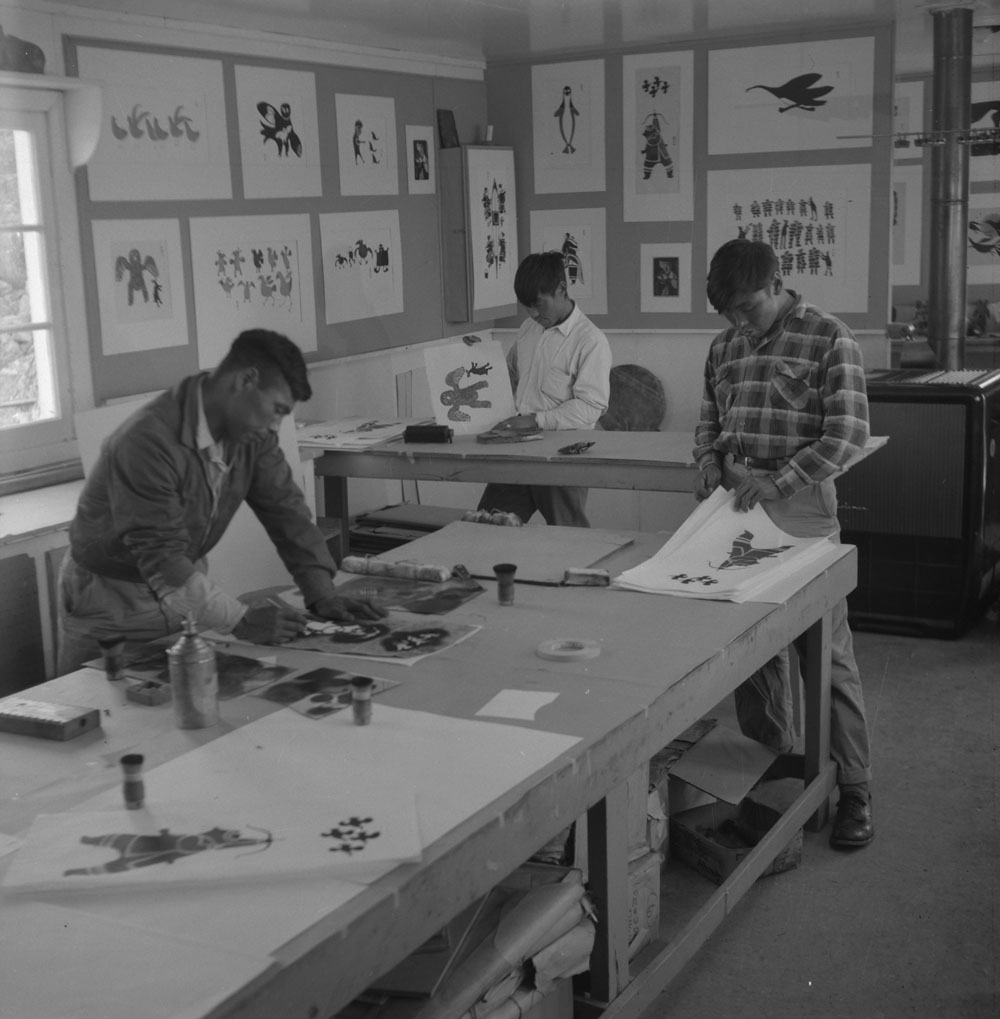
The print shop in September 1960.

In the late 1940s the printmaker James Archibald Houston was working in the western part of Baffin Island and became enamoured by the sculptures being produced by some of its residents. Following his return to Montreal, he became a "roving crafts officer" for the Canadian Handicrafts Guild, representing Inuit artworks to southern audiences. In this position he would buy Inuit art in the north and sell them in the south of Canada. In 1954, following the decline of the local fur trade, the Canadian government sent Houston to Kinngait, then called Cape Dorset. He started a printmaking studio which pioneered Inuit printmaking as an alternate source of income for its residents. There, he met and began collaborating with the Inuk artist Kananginak Pootoogook. In 1959, they released a series of prints by Inuit artists that found immediate success. The same year, they founded the West Baffin Eskimo Cooperative as a business entity for local Inuit artists whose work was gaining in popularity at the time. Kananginak Pootoogook was its first president. In 1960 the Inuit management of the co-operative hired Terry Ryan, a recent Ontario College of Art graduate as the co-operative's general manager.

In 1961, the Canadian Eskimo Arts Committee was established by the Canadian government, at the request of the co-operative. Its role was to set standards for the annual print edition, and to promote and market the works. Operated by the Canadian government, the committee had no Inuit members for the first twelve years of its existence, until 1973 when Joanasie Salomonie and Armand Tagoona became members. The committee disbanded in 1989.

Terry Ryan would stay with the co-operative until 2009; in 1978 he was instrumental in founding Dorset Fine Arts, the Toronto-based marketing arm of the co-operative.

In 1977, after a fire destroyed the print studio and archive of the Sanavik Co-operative in Baker Lake, the co-operative decided to move the bulk of its print collection into storage at the McMichael Canadian Art Collection. In 2019 the co-operative entered into an agreement with the McMichael to digitize over 100,000 prints and sculptures from the co-operative's collection.

In the 1980s and 1990s, Dorset Fine Arts represented Ovilu Tunnillie, featuring multiple solo exhibitions of her work.

In 2018 the co-operative and the municipality of Kinngait (then Cape Dorset) collaborated to build the Kenojouak Cultural Center and Printshop to house the co-operative's operations.

The co-operative celebrated its 60th anniversary in 2019 with a touring exhibition of works produced by its members.

In 2019 the Canadian Premier League hired the co-operative to design and sculpt its annual trophies for individual player awards such as Golden Boot, Golden Goalie and Player of the Year.

== Artists ==
Below is a list of some of the artists from Kinngait:

- Kenojuak Ashevak
- Kiugak Ashoona
- Pitseolak Ashoona
- Shuvinai Ashoona
- Kingmeata Etidlooie
- Osuitok Ipeelee
- Siassie Kenneally
- Qaunaq Mikkigak
- Ohotaq Mikkigak
- Omalluq Oshutsiaq
- Eleeshushe Parr
- Parr
- Peter Pitseolak
- Tim Pitsiulak
- Annie Pootoogook
- Elijah Pootoogook
- Kananginak Pootoogook
- Napachie Pootoogook
- Mary Pudlat
- Pudlo Pudlat
- Lucy Qinnuayuak
- Simeonie Quppapik
- Pauta Saila
- Pitaloosie Saila
- Ningiukulu Teevee
- Ovilu Tunnillie

=== Royal Canadian Academy of Arts ===
As of 2005 over a dozen artists from Cape Dorset have been made members of the Royal Canadian Academy of Arts:

1. Abraham Etungat
2. Pitseolak Ashoona
3. Pauta Saila
4. Kenojuak Ashevak
5. Osuitok Ipeelee
6. Kananginak Pootoogook
7. Mayureak Ashoona
8. Kiugak Ashoona
9. Paulaussie Pootoogook
10. Toonoo Sharky
11. Pitaloosie Saila
12. Aqjangajuk Shaa
13. Ovilu Tunnillie

== Also see ==
- Baker Lake Printmakers Co-operative
