= Ashoona =

Ashoona is a surname commonly found in Inuit culture.

People with this surname include:

- Kiugak Ashoona (1933–2014), Canadian Inuk sculptor
- Mayureak Ashoona (born 1946), Canadian Inuk artist
- Napachie Ashoona (1938–2002), commonly known by married name Napachie Pootoogook, Canadian Inuk graphic artist
- Pitseolak Ashoona (1904–1983), Canadian Inuk sculptor
- Shuvinai Ashoona (born 1961), Canadian Inuk artist
