= Jean Blodgett =

Canadian curator (1945-2020)

- Born: Ruth Jean Blodgett; August 14, 1945; Moscow, Idaho
- Died: December 2020; Fairbanks, Alaska
- Education: B.A. University of Colorado (1967); M.F.A. University of British Columbia (1974)
- Known for: curator, writer, educator

Jean Blodgett was an American-born curator and prolific writer devoted to Inuit art who spent her career in Canada. She was known as a force in her field, the curator who began the serious art historical study of Inuit art in the early 1970s, at a time when few worked on the subject. Her books were popular. Kenojuak (Toronto: Firefly Books, 1985) went through six editions.

== Career ==
Blodgett was born in Moscow, Idaho but moved with her family to Prosser, Washington in 1946 where she grew up. She attended the University of Colorado in Boulder, Colorado for her B.A. in English literature and classics, graduating in 1967. Additional studies in Israel (1960-1961) and particularly Greece (1965-1966) interested her in art history. She completed her M.F.A. In 1974 at the University of British Columbia, writing her thesis on Inuit art.

At the Winnipeg Art Gallery, as the gallery's first Curator of Eskimo Art (1975-1979), she organized numerous exhibitions on Inuit art. From 1978 to 1988, she was employed as an independent curator, writer and consultant, organizing shows on Inuit art for galleries, such as the Art Gallery of Ontario for whom she organized shows on the Klamer Collection of Inuit Art (1983) and on North Baffin drawings (1986), as well as at the McMichael Canadian Art Collection where she curated the first retrospective exhibition of the art of Kenojuak Ashevak in 1986. She also did contract work for many other institutions, such as the National Gallery of Canada.

From 1988 to 2000, she was Chief Curator at the McMichael, also serving from 1990 to 2000, in the role of Director of Collections & Programs, as a member of the team responsible for long-term planning. She was involved in numerous publications and exhibitions, and was particularly renowned for her Inuit shows and research such as In Cape Dorset we do it this way: three decades of Inuit printmaking (1991); Strange scenes: early Cape Dorset drawings (1993); and Three women, three generations: drawings by Pitseolak Ashoona, Napatchie Pootoogook and Shuvinai Ashoona (1999). She was instrumental in bringing in the Kinngait archive (of almost 100,000 drawings) from the West Baffin Eskimo Co-operative in Kinngait to nouse it in the McMichael gallery in 1991. She continued to broaden the McMichael's scope by curating and writing about contemporary artists including shows about Gerald McMaster (1991), John Hartman (1993), and Tim Zuck (1997) and Doris McCarthy (1999).

In 2000 she turned again to independent curating, traveling to the Arctic to visit Indigenous artists, and writing. Then in 2004 she moved to Fairbanks, Alaska to fill in as a visiting professor on Arctic art at the University of Alaska. After her course was completed, she remained in Fairbanks and wrote and edited a book on Alaskan art; and as guest curator, organized In the Shadow of the Midnight Sun: Sami and Inuit Art, 2000-2005, for the Art Gallery of Hamilton, Ontario (2007), where she served as guest curator. For the show, she travelled to Norway to do research on Sami art and gallery collections.

Blodgett also was an educator. She taught art history at the University of Calgary (1974), and the University of British Columbia (1975); Inuit or Native art at the University of Winnipeg (1976-1979), Carleton University (where she was Adjunct Professor) (1984-1988), The Colorado College, Colorado Springs (1991-1992), and the University of Waterloo (1998); and Arts and Culture at York University (1999-2000); and at the University of Alaska (2004).

Jean Blodgett died in Fairbanks, Alaska in December 2020. The Jean Blodgett Archives is in the Edward P. Taylor Library & Archives, Art Gallery of Ontario, Toronto.

== Selected memberships and boards ==
- Canadian Museum Association (1979+);
- Inuit Art Foundation, Board of Directors (1988-1990);
- Journal of Canadian Art History (1985-1992);
