= Lucy Qinnuayuak =

Inuk artist (1915–1982)

- ᓗᓯ ᑭᓐᐅᐊᔪᐊ
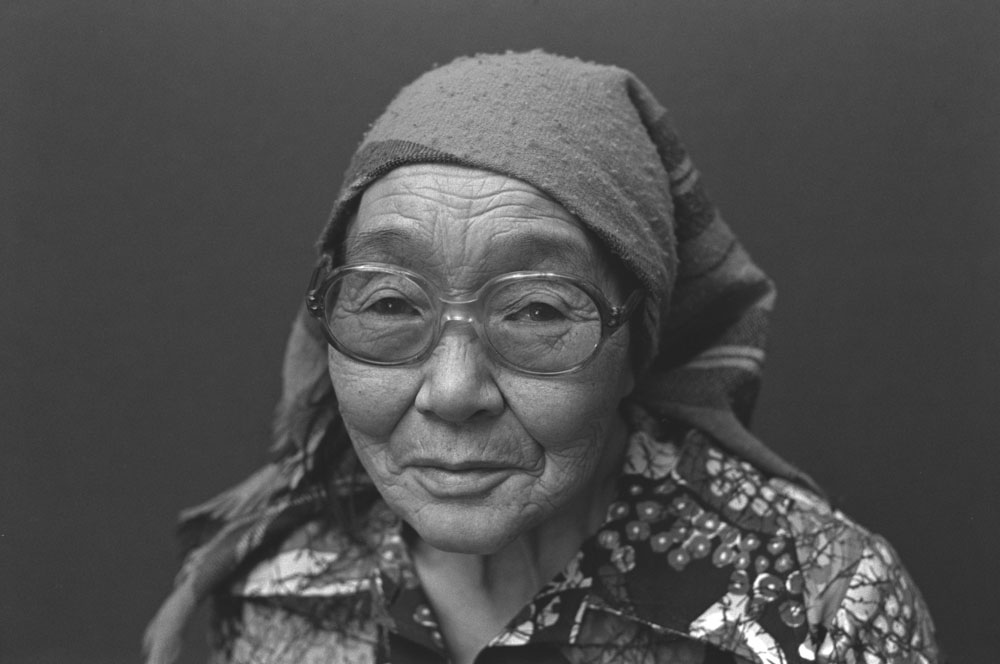
- Qinnuayuak in 1980
- Born: 1915; Salluit, Quebec, Canada
- Died: 1982 (aged 66–67); Cape Dorset, Northwest Territories, Canada (now Kinngait, Nunavut)
- Notable work: We All Have Something to Do (1964)
- Spouse: Tikituk Qinnuayuak (m. 1930s–1982)
- Family: Kenojuak Ashevak (niece)

Lucy Qinnuayuak (ᓗᓯ ᑭᓐᐅᐊᔪᐊ; [qinnuajuaq]; 1915–1982) was an Inuk graphic artist and printmaker.

== Early life ==
Qinnuayuak was born in or near Salluit, Quebec in 1915. As a child, she moved with her family to Baffin Island, where they settled in Cape Dorset. After the death of her father, her mother remarried. Lucy traveled with her mother and stepfather on hunting trips in the Cape Dorset region.

== Artistic career ==
Lucy's Owl (1969), a stonecut printed by Eegyvudluk Pootoogook for the 1969 Cape Dorset annual print collection

Qinnuayuak began drawing in the late 1950s while living in Kangia, where she and her brother-in-law Niviaqsi produced drawings at the request of James Archibald Houston. Her work was first included in the Cape Dorset print collection in 1961, and by the time of her death in 1982, 136 of her prints were published in the collection. Qinnuayuak worked primarily in graphite and coloured pencils, but experimented more in the 1970s and 1980s with watercolour and acrylic paints. In the final two decades of her life, she created thousands of images of stylized birds and scenes depicting women's roles in traditional Inuit culture.

Qinnuayuak's work, known for its renderings of Arctic birds, has been exhibited extensively in and outside of Canada. One of her designs was used in promotional banners for the 1976 Summer Olympics, and her 1964 stone cut We All Have Something to Do is part of the Senate of Canada's Aboriginal art collection.

In 1973, Qinnuayuak worked closely with visiting Toronto artist K.M. Graham, who had set up a studio in the sunroom of Terry Ryan's home in Cape Dorset. Graham introduced her to pastels and to using acrylic paint in a watercolour style. Despite a language barrier, they often painted together, with Qinnuayuak's grandson Otiloo occasionally serving as interpreter. Graham later recalled Qinnuayuak's enthusiasm for experimenting with colour and technique, describing their time together as humorous and productive.

=== Exhibitions ===
Qinnuayuak's work has been exhibited in more than eighty group and solo shows, including:

- The Inuit Print, organised by the Department of Indian Affairs and the Canadian Museum of Civilisation, which toured internationally from 1977 to 1982
- Looking South, Winnipeg Art Gallery, 1978
- Flights of Fancy: Kenojuak Ashevak, Lucy Qinnuayuak, Pitaloosie Saila, held at the Art Gallery of Ontario and as a travelling exhibition, 1989
- Birds and Flowers: Eskimo Graphics by Lucy Qinnuayuak, Arctic Artistry, New York, 1989

=== Collections ===
Qinnuayuak's work is held by institutions including:

- Agnes Etherington Art Centre in Kingston
- Albuquerque Museum
- Amon Carter Museum of American Art
- Art Gallery of Ontario
- Art Gallery of Sudbury
- Beaverbrook Art Gallery
- Blackwood Gallery
- Canadian Museum of History
- Inuit Cultural Institute
- Louisiana Art & Science Museum
- Macdonald Stewart Art Centre in Guelph
- Museum of Anthropology at UBC
- Museum London
- National Gallery of Canada in Ottawa
- National Museum of the American Indian
- Robert McLaughlin Gallery in Oshawa
- Saint Mary's College Museum of Art in Halifax
- San Juan Islands Museum of Art
- Tate
- University of Michigan Museum of Art

== Personal life ==
As a teenager, Qinnuayuak entered an arranged marriage to Tikituk Qinnuayuak, a sculptor and graphic artist. They met in the Nunavik camp of Supyjuak, later moving to Kangia, northeast of Cape Dorset. Tikituk carved in caribou antler and wood as a child, later transitioning to stone carving after the arrival of James Houston in Cape Dorset. Several of his works were exhibited in the early 1950s, including internationally. Lucy welcomed the income from art, particularly during a period when her husband was sent south in 1961 to be treated for tuberculosis. After Tikituk's recovery from tuberculosis, the family settled permanently in Cape Dorset.

Lucy and Tikituk had nine children, five of whom died in childhood. They also adopted two children and raised five orphaned children of Tikituk's brother, Niviaqsi. Her niece, Kenojuak Ashevak, was also involved in the arts. She died on 10 September 1982.
