= Kiakshuk =

Inuk artist from Canada (1886-1966)

Kiakshuk ᑭᐊᓱ
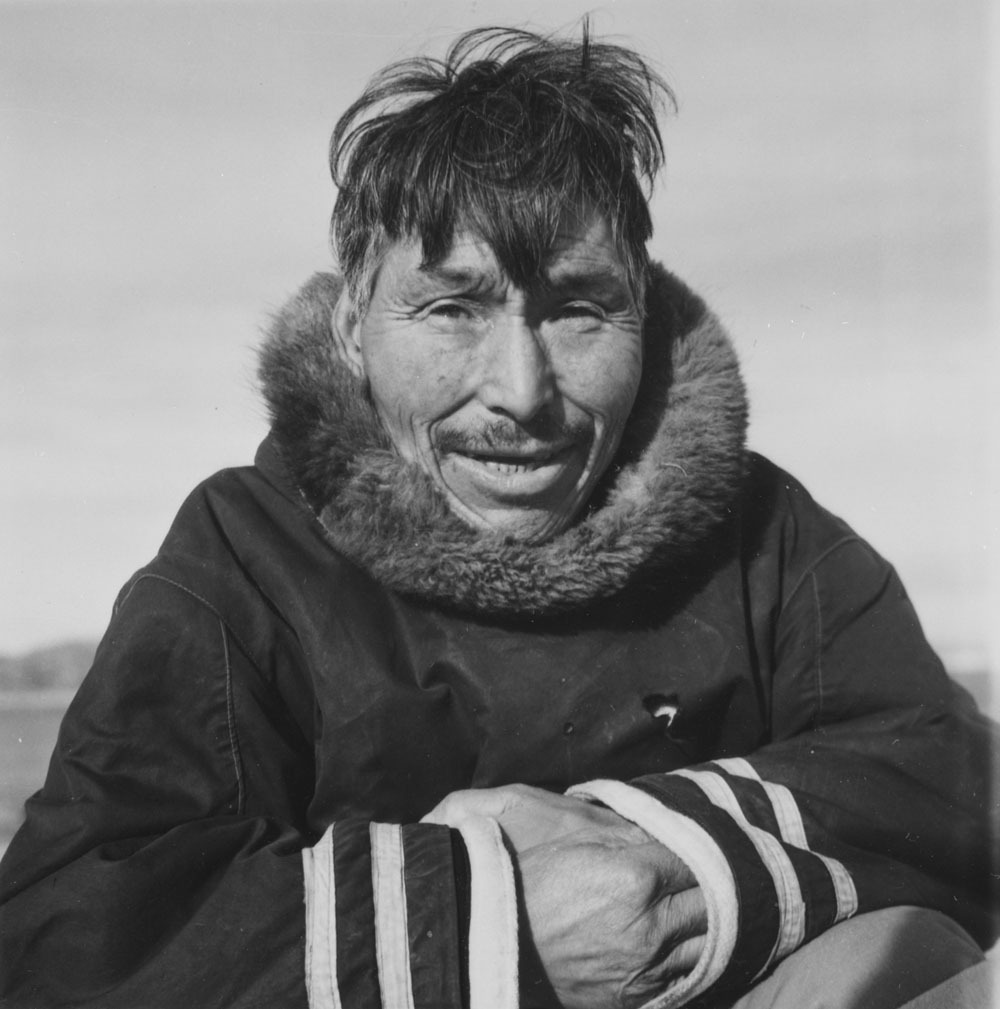
- Kiakshuk photographed by Rosemary Gilliat in 1960 in Cape Dorset, Nunavut
- Born: 1886; Baffin Island, Nunavut
- Died: May 3, 1966 (aged 79–80)
- Children: Lukta Qiatsuq; Ishuhungitok Pootoogook; Paunichea

Kiakshuk (1886 – May 3, 1966) was a Canadian Inuk artist who worked both in sculpture and printmaking. Kiakshuk began printmaking in his seventies and, is most commonly praised for creating “real Eskimo pictures” that relate traditional Inuit life and mythology.

== Personal life ==
Kiakshuk was born in 1886 in the north of Baffin Island in Nunavut and moved with his family to the south of Baffin Island to Cape Dorset around 1900. Prior to creating artwork, he earned his living as a hunter.

In 1920, Kiakshuk had a dispute with Ohotok, the husband of both of his sisters Ekateelik and Napatchies. Ohotok promised Kiakshuk the hand of his own sister, Mary, but since Mary was already married to another man named Napatchie Ottochie, the agreement fell apart. When Napatchie died in a hunting accident, there was a rumor that Kiakshuk, a shaman, had caused his death.

In 1958, Kiakshuk appeared in the film The Living Stone, produced by the National Film Board of Canada. In the film he tells Inuit folk tales, sings traditional songs, and discusses the importance of sculpture to a group of children.

Multiple members of Kiakshuk's family also became visual artists, including his son Lukta Qiatsuq, daughters Ishuhungitok Pootoogook and Paunichea, and his cousin Pitseolak Ashoona.

== Artistic career ==
Kiakshuk learned printmaking from James Houston, an artist who was hired by Canadian federal government to develop Inuit art and craft production in the far North. Houston was working in the South Baffin Island region, Kiakshuk's home, beginning in 1956. Houston established an artistic co-operative in Cape Dorset in order to encourage Inuit art. After traveling to Japan in 1958 to study with Sosaku-hanga movement artists, including Un'ichi Hiratsuka, Houston brought back printmaking techniques to the co-operative. Since wood is rare in Cape Dorset, many of the Japanese printmaking techniques Houston taught to Inuit artists had to be adapted to local materials, leading Kiakshuk and other artists to practice stonecut printmaking. Unlike traditional Japanese woodcut prints, Inuit artists tend to carve just one block for printing and apply all colors to the same block.

Kiakshuk's subject matter typically involved stories of Inuit religion and scenes of daily life.

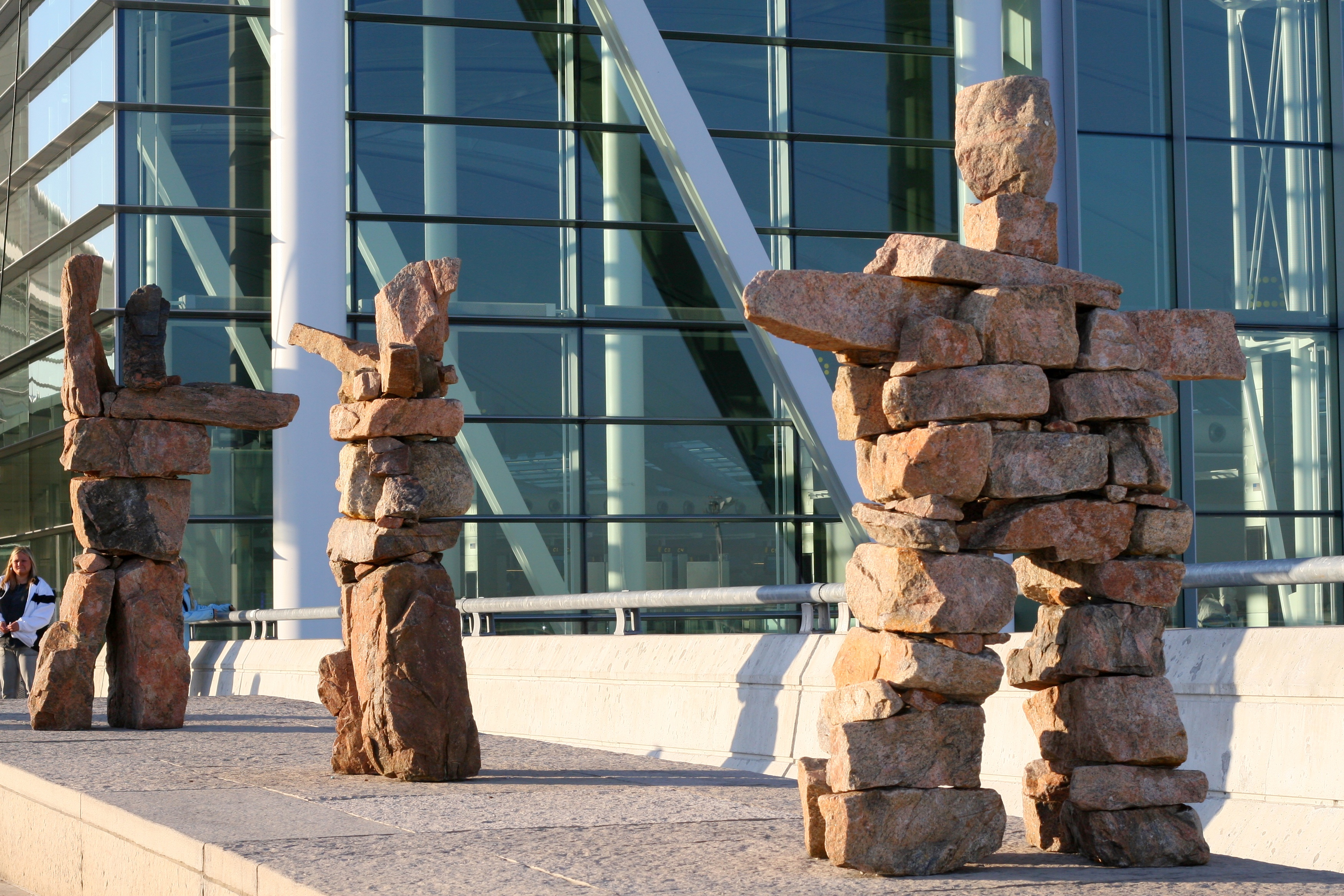
Kiakshuk, Three Inukshuks, 1963 (Toronto Pearson International Airport)

In 1963, Kiakshuk produced three inukshuks, or monumental stone sculptures, for Toronto's Pearson International Airport. The sculptures were reinstalled in 2002 and are the subject of ongoing disagreement as recently as 2017 as some Inuit activists believe the sculptures were installed in a disrespectful manner.

Kiakshuk also sold his drawings and prints for use in book publication, such as Eskimo Songs and Stories, published 1974.

In 1979, one of Kiakshuk's prints was featured on a Canadian postage stamp.

American rock band DIIV used Kiakshuk's artwork on the cover of their 2012 album Oshin.

== Exhibitions ==
- Ten Years of Eskimo Prints and Recent Sculptures - National Gallery of Canada, 1967
- Strange Scenes—Early Cape Dorset Drawings - McMichael Canadian Art Collection, 1993
- Classic Prints from Cape Dorset: 1960–1972 - Alberts Gallery of Inuit Art, 2003
- Then and Now: Inuit Prints from 1962 to 2002 - Inuit Gallery of Vancouver, 2003
- Kiakshuk: Images by a Hunter-Artist - National Gallery of Canada, 2001–2002

=== Collections ===
- Agnes Etherington Art Centre
- Fine Arts Museum of San Francisco
- McMaster Museum of Art, McMaster University
- Metropolitan Museum of Art
- Museum of Anthropology, University of British Columbia
- Museum London
- National Gallery of Canada
- National Museum of the American Indian
- Pennsylvania Academy of the Fine Arts
- San Juan Islands Museum of Art
- University of Michigan Museum of Art
- Whyte Museum of the Canadian Rockies

== Publications ==
- Eskimo Prints - James A. Houston, 1967
- The Art of Qaqaq Ashoona - Christine Lalonde, 1996
- Kiakshuk: Images by a Hunter-Artist - IAQ, 2001
- An Annotated Bibliography of Inuit Art - Richard C. Crandall and Susan M. Crandall, 2005

== Gallery ==
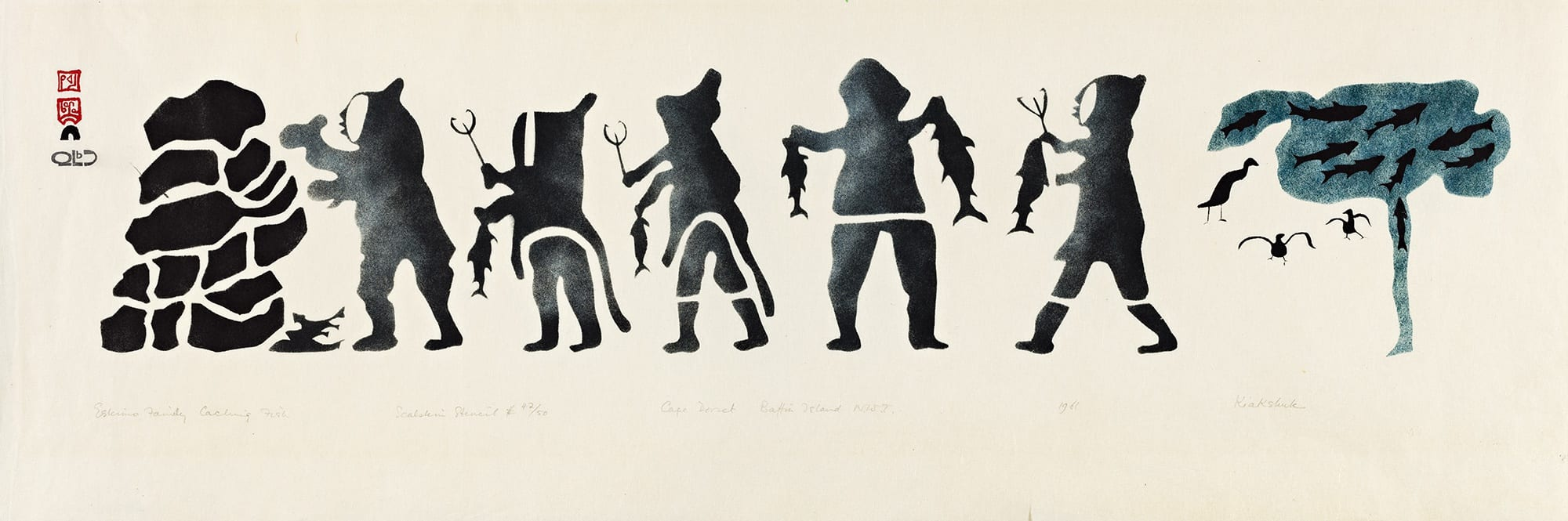
Eskimo Family Caching Fish (1960)

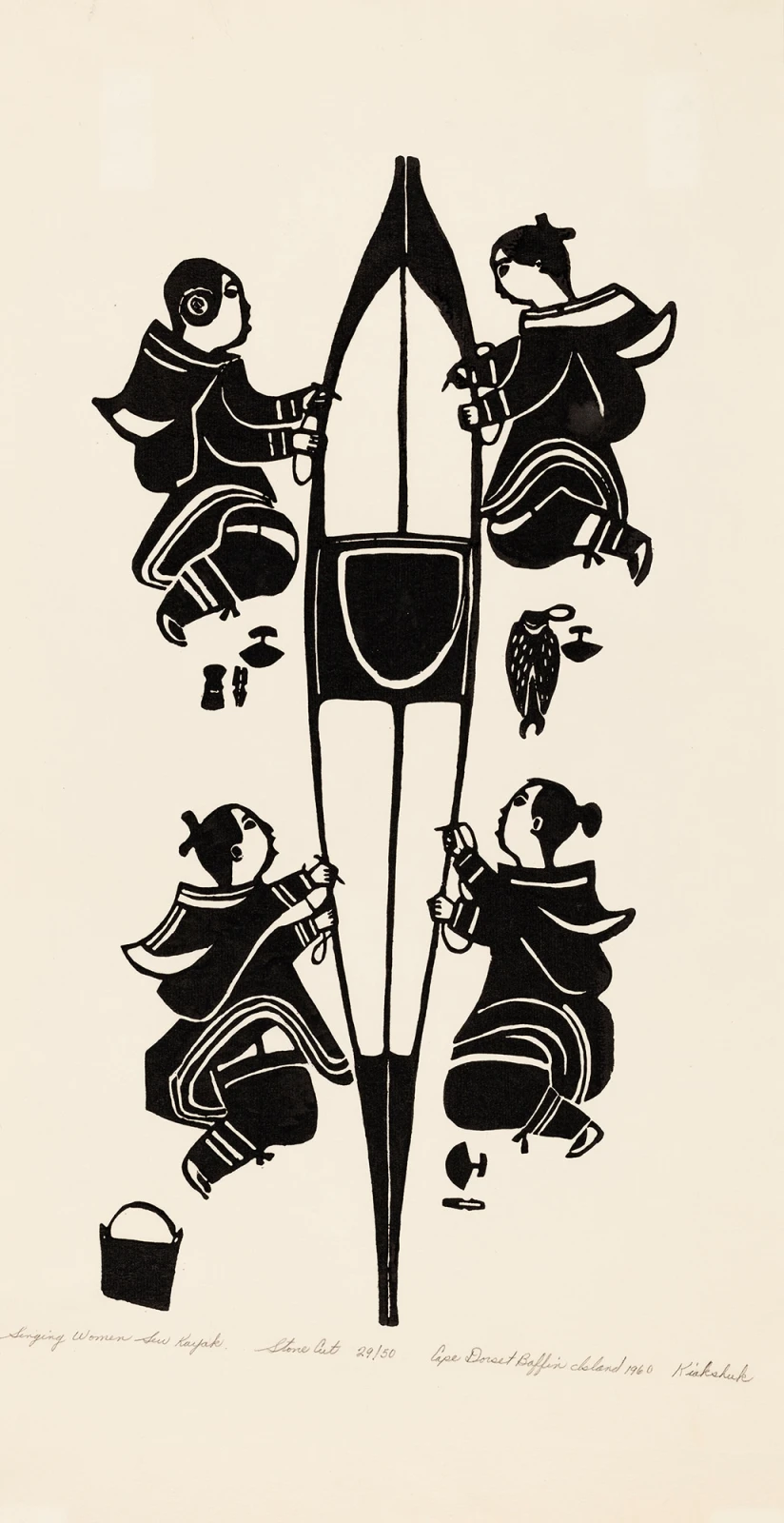
Singing Women Sew Kayak (1960)

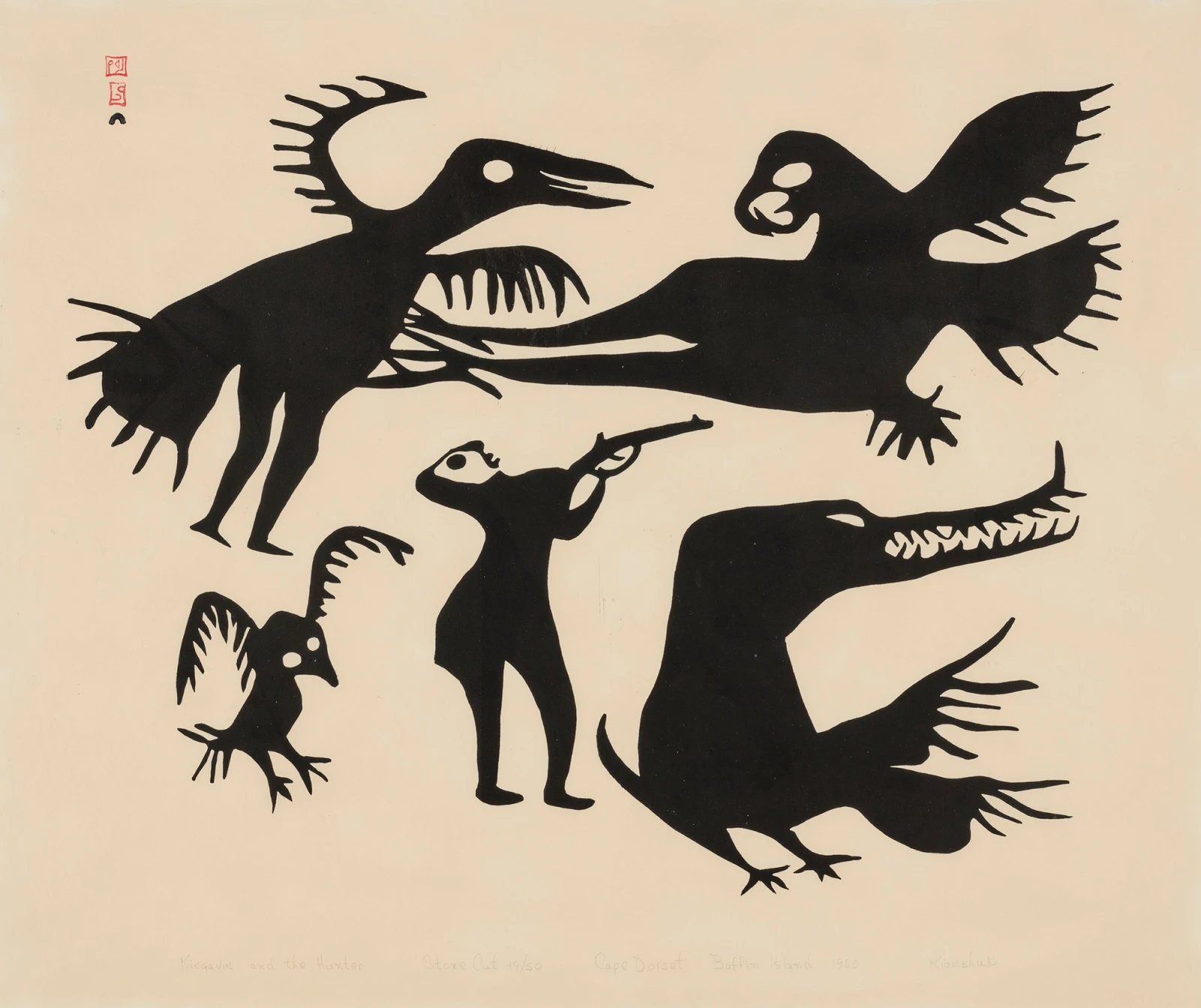
Kikgavik and the Hunter (1960)

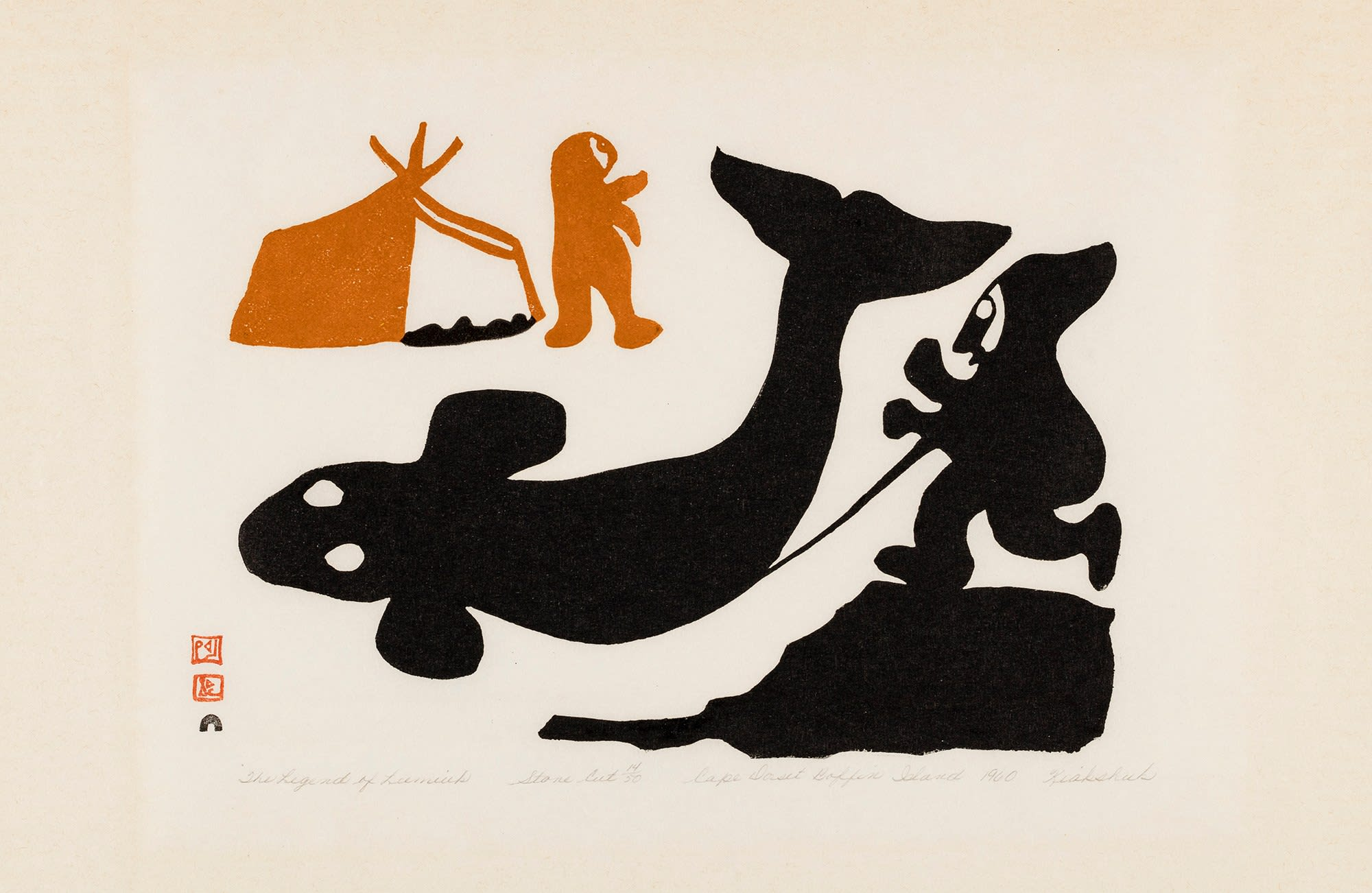
The Legend of Lumiuk (1960)

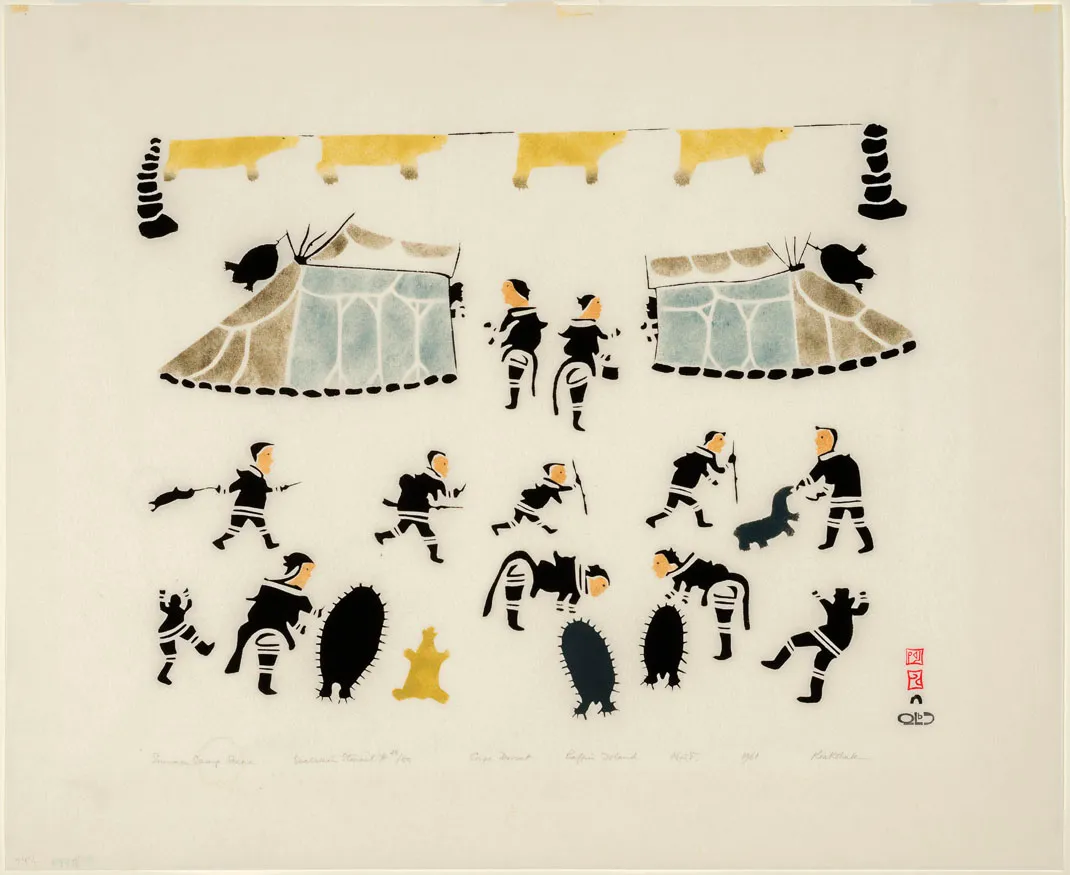
Summer Camp Scene (1961)

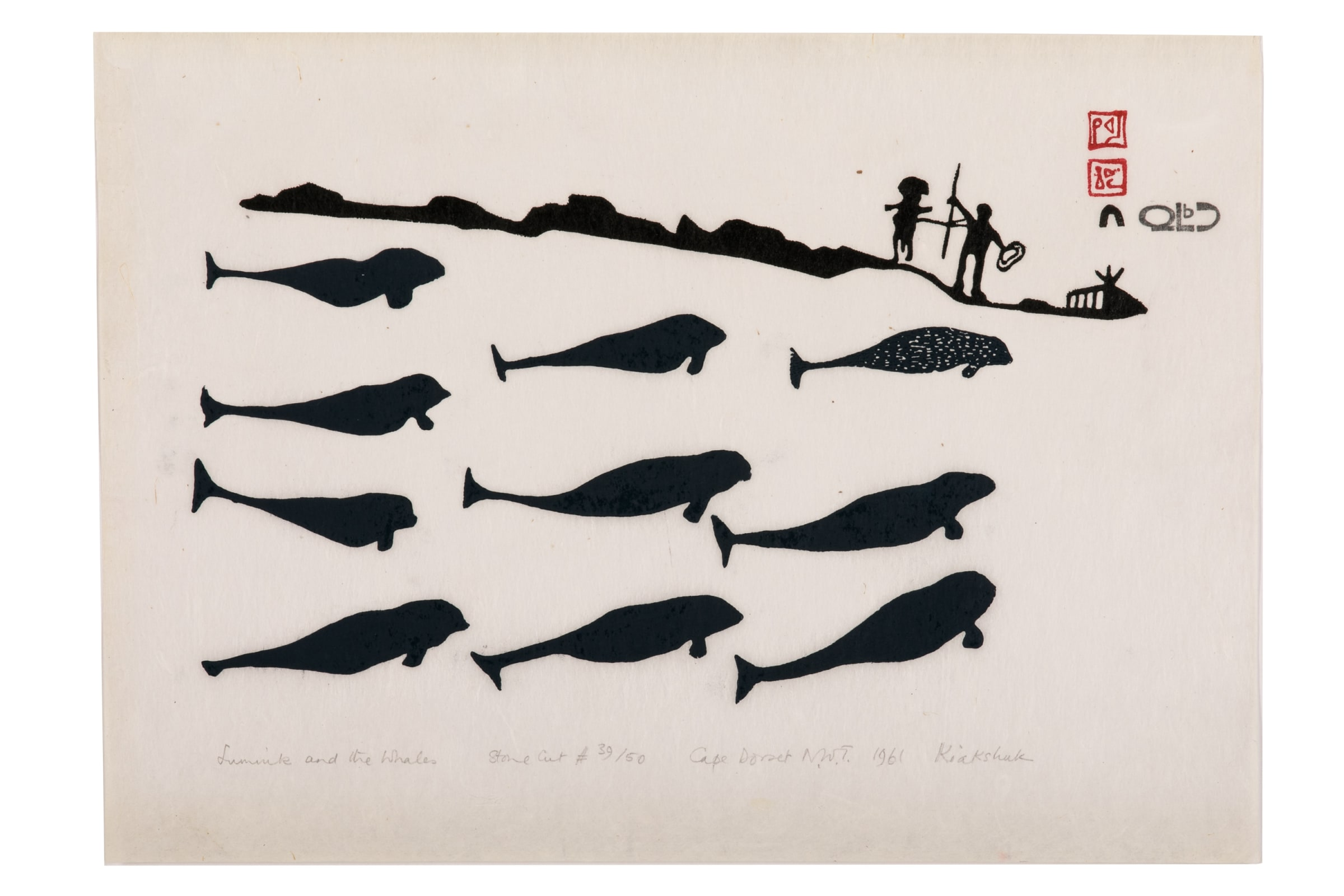
Lumiuk and the Whales (1961)

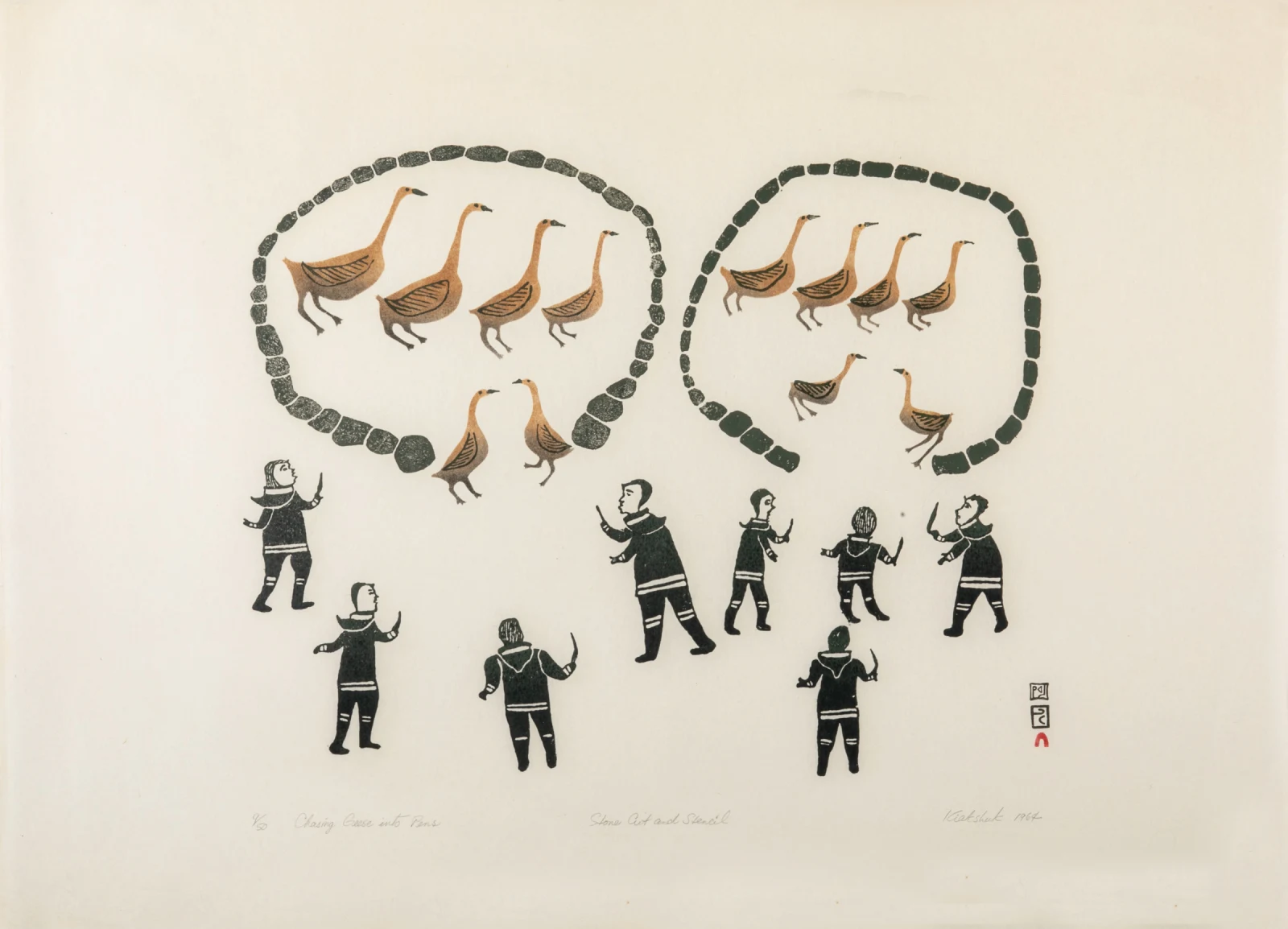
Chasing Geese Into Pens (1964)
