= Eegyvudluk Pootoogook =

Inuk sculptor (1931–2000)

- Born: 1931
- Died: 2000 (aged 68–69)
- Spouse: Napachie Pootoogook

Eegyvudluk Pootoogook (1931–2000) was an Inuk printmaker and sculptor. He was married to the artist Napachie Pootoogook.

== Early life and education ==
He was born in 1931, to graphic artist and carver Joseph (Eegyvudluk) Pootagook (1887–1958) and graphic artist Ningeookaluk (1889–1962). His father was an important hunter and camp leader. His brothers Kananginak, Paulassie, Solomonie, and Pudlat all became artists as well.

== Career ==
Pootoogook was part of the West Baffin Eskimo Co-operative, where he worked alongside Iyola Kingwatsiak and Lukta Qiaqsuq. He was one of Kinngait's eminent printmakers of the 1980s, and sculpted as well. He was known to have tried a variety of printmaking techniques, including linocut, lithography, etching, stonecut, stonecut and stencil, sealskin stencil, stencil, and silkscreen and stencil. His works frequently depicted animals native to Nunavut, including Arctic hares, bears, geese, and muskox. He also created images of sea spirits.

Pootoogook's work is held in the permanent collections of several museums, including the Tate, the Agnes Etherington Art Centre, the Museum of Anthropology at UBC, the Canadian Museum of History, the University of Lethbridge Art Collection the National Gallery of Canada, and the University of Michigan Museum of Art.

== Personal life ==
In the mid-1950s, he married artist Napachie Pootoogook, daughter of Pitseolak Ashoona, in an arranged marriage. They married in Kaiktuuq, Nunavut, then moved to Cape Dorset where they lived for most of their marriage, except for two years spent living in Iqaluit. They had eleven children (many of whom died young) including the artist Annie Pootoogook (1969–2016).
