= Kenojuak Ashevak =

Inuk artist (1927–2013)

- ᕿᓐᓄᐊᔪᐊᖅ ᐋᓯᕙᒃ (Qinnuajuaq Aasivak)
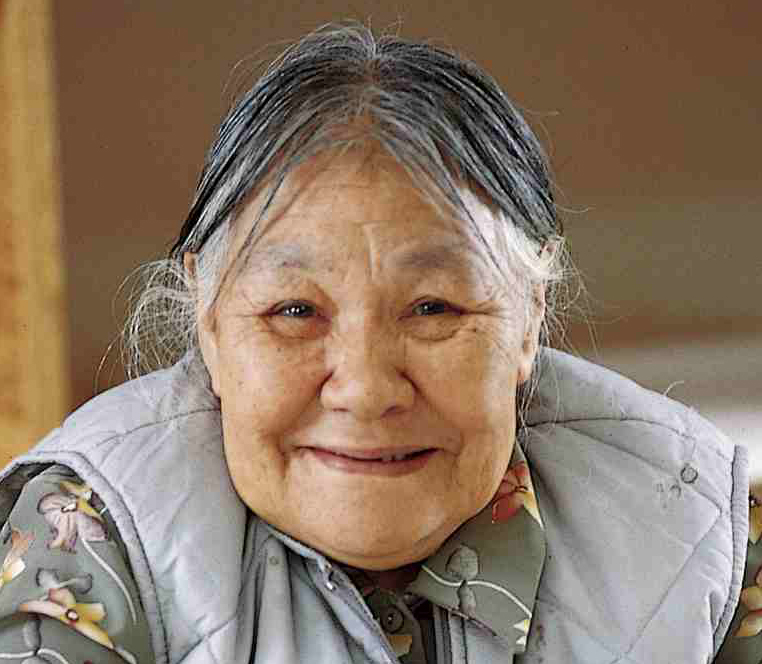
- Ashevak in 1997
- Born: October 3, 1927; Ikirasaqa / Ikirasaq, Baffin Island, Northwest Territories, Canada
- Died: January 8, 2013 (aged 85); Cape Dorset (now Kinngait), Dorset Island, Nunavut, Canada
- Known for: soapstone carver, graphic artist
- Movement: Inuit art
- Spouse: Johnniebo Ashevak (died 1972) Etyguyakjua Pee (died 1977) Joanassie Igiu (died 1978)
- Family: Lucy Qinnuayuak (aunt)
- Awards: Order of Canada, Order of Nunavut

Kenojuak Ashevak (October 3, 1927 – January 8, 2013), CC ONu RCA (Inuktitut: ᕿᓐᓄᐊᔪᐊᖅ ᐋᓯᕙᒃ, Qinnuajuaq Aasivak) was a Canadian Inuk artist. Born at Camp Kerrasak on southern Baffin Island, she later died in Cape Dorset, Nunavut. Known primarily for her drawings as a graphic artist, she had a diverse artistic experience, making sculpture and engraving and working with textiles and also on stained glass. She is celebrated as a leading figure of modern Inuit art and one of Canada's preeminent artists and cultural icons.

Part of a pioneering generation of Arctic creators, her career spanned more than five decades. She made graphic art, drawings and prints in stone cut, lithography and etching, beloved by the public, museums and collectors alike. Kenojuak mainly painted animals in fantastical, brightly-colored aspects, but also painted landscapes and scenes of everyday life, in a desire to make them beautiful by her own standards, and convey a spirit of happiness and positivity. She had an intuitive and sensitive way of working: she began her work without having a clear idea of the final result, letting herself be guided by her intuition and her own perception of colours and shapes. She painted throughout her life, never ceasing to seek out new techniques to renew her artistic creation. Her fantastical, seemingly simple works became more complex with time, taking on a more technical aspect. At the end of her life, the artist returned to simpler, more singular forms and even brighter colors.

Ashevak surmounted her circumstances to become an artist. Her range of mediums was exceptionally broad and included stained glass. Her achievements were honoured. She was the first Inuk artist inducted into Canada's Walk of Fame (2001), was made an Officer of the Order of Canada (1967) and promoted to Companion in 1982. She received the Governor General's Award in Visual and Media Arts (2008) and the Order of Nunavut (2012). Her work, with its superb design qualities, was used for Canadian stamps, coins and banknotes. Kenojuak's best-known work, making her one of the most famous Inuit artists, remains The Enchanted Owl (1960). This major work by the artist was used on a stamp to commemorate the centenary of the Northwest Territories in the 1970s. Her artistic work is thus recognized as an integral part of Inuit culture, and more broadly of Canadian culture. In 2017, the Bank of Canada unveiled a commemorative $10 banknote in honour of Canada's 150th birthday featuring Ashevak's print Owl's Bouquet on the note. She received Honorary Doctorates from Queen's University (1991) and the University of Toronto (1992) and many films were made about her life.

== Early life and family ==
Kenojuak Ashevak was born in an igloo in an Inuit camp, Ikirasaqa or Ikirasaq, at the southern coast of Baffin Island. Kenojuak grew up in the heart of the semi-nomadic hunting tradition. Her father, Ushuakjuk, an Inuk hunter and fur trader, and her mother, Silaqqi, named Kenojuak after Silaqqi's deceased father. According to this Inuit naming tradition, the love and respect that had been accorded to her during her lifetime would now pass on to their daughter. Kenojuak also had a brother and a sister. Her aunt was the artist Lucy Qinnuayuak. Kenojuak remembered Ushuakjuk as "a kind and benevolent man." Her father, a respected angakkuq (shaman), "had more knowledge than average mortals, and he would help all the Inuit people [sic]." According to Kenojuak, her father believed he could predict weather, predict good hunting seasons and even turn into a walrus; he also had the ability "to make fish swarm at the surface so it was easier to fish." Her father came into conflict with Christian converts, and some enemies assassinated him in a hunting camp in 1933, when she was only six.

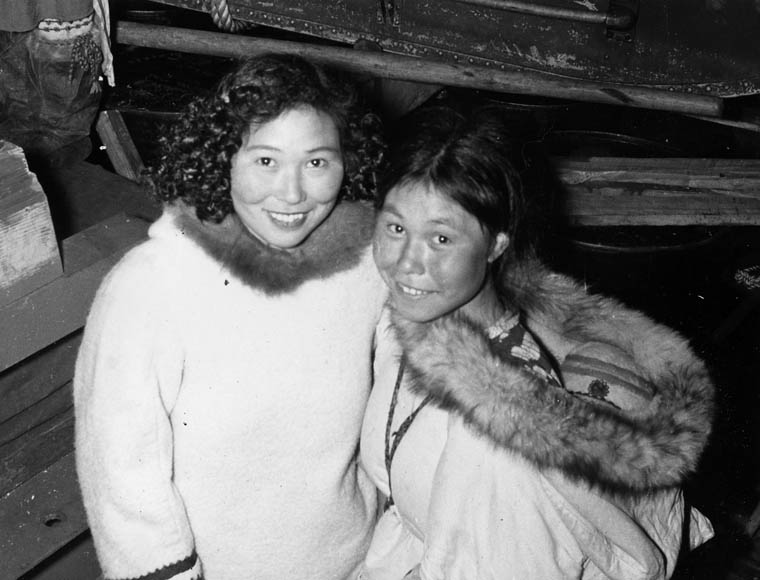
Oolooreak [left] and [Kenojuak Ashevak, right] on board the Eastern Arctic Patrol ship M.V. Regina Polaris 1948

After her father's murder, Kenojuak moved with her widowed mother Silaqqi and family to the home of Silaqqi's mother, Koweesa, who taught her traditional crafts, including the repair of seal skins for trade with the Hudson's Bay Company and how to make waterproof clothes sewn with caribou sinew.

When she was 19, her mother, Silaqqi, and stepfather, Takpaugni, arranged for her to marry Johnniebo Ashevak (1923–1972), a local Inuk hunter. Kenojuak was reluctant, she said, even playfully throwing pebbles at him when he would approach her. In time, however, she came to love him for his kindness and gentleness, a man who developed artistic talents in his own right and who sometimes collaborated with her on projects; the National Gallery of Canada holds two of Johnniebo's works, Taleelayo with Sea Bird (1965) and Hare Spirits (1960).

She fell victim to tuberculosis, hospitalized between 1952 and 1955 in Parc Savard hospital in Quebec City. While living in Quebec City, Kenojuak met Harold Pfeiffer, who taught arts and crafts to hospital patients, and civil administrator and pioneer Inuit art promoter James Archibald Houston who ultimately helped her to launch her career.

She had just given birth when she was forcibly transferred; the baby was adopted by a neighbouring family. Several of Kenojuak's children died while she was confined in hospital.

In 1966, Kenojuak and Johnniebo moved to Cape Dorset to enable her children to attend school. Many of their children and grandchildren succumbed to disease, as did her husband after 26 years of marriage. Three daughters of Kenojuak, Mary, Elisapee Qiqituk, and Aggeok, died in childhood, and four sons, Jamasie, her adopted son Ashevak, and Kadlarjuk and Qiqituk. The latter two were adopted at birth by another family.

The year after Johnniebo died in 1972, Kenojuak remarried, to Etyguyakjua Pee; he died in 1977. In 1978 she married Joanassie Igiu. She had 11 children by her first husband and adopted five more; seven of her children died in childhood. At the time of her death from lung cancer, she was living in a wood-frame house in Cape Dorset (now Kinngait).

== Career ==
Kenojuak Ashevak became one of the first Inuit women in Cape Dorset to begin drawing. She worked in graphite, coloured pencils and felt-tip pens, and occasionally used poster paints, watercolours or acrylics. She created many carvings from soapstone and thousands of drawings, etchings, stone cut prints and prints — all sought after by museums and collectors. She designed several drawings for Canadian stamps and coins, and in 2004 she created the first Inuk-designed stained-glass window for the John Bell Chapel in Oakville, Ontario. In 2017, the $10 bill released in celebration of Canada's 150th birthday features Kenojuak's stone-cut and stencil printed work called "Owl's Bouquet" in silver holographic foil.

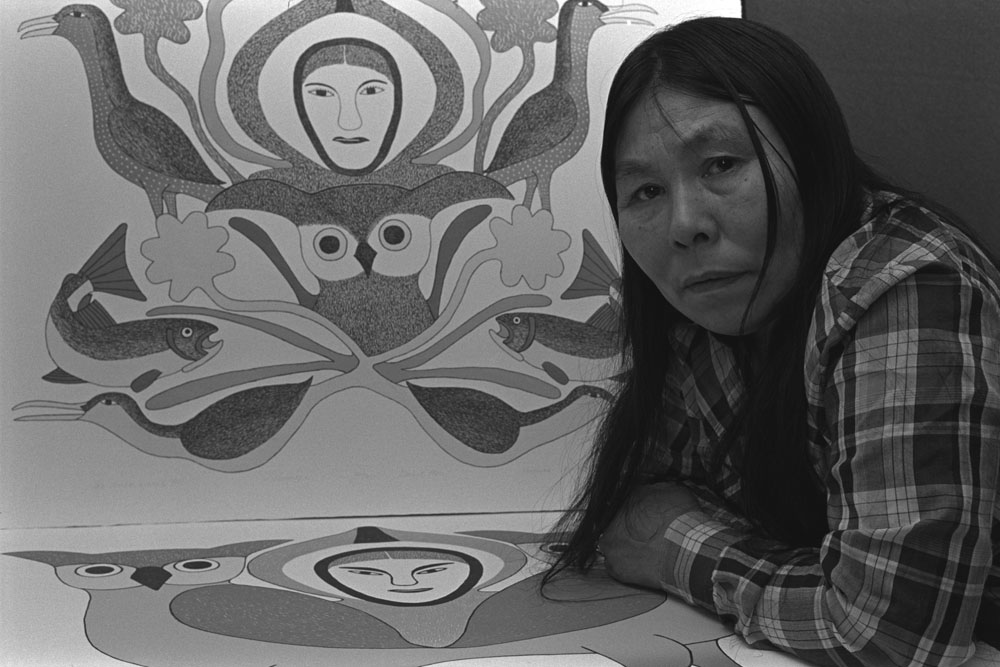
1980

During Ashevak's stay at Parc Savard hospital in Quebec City, 1952 to 1955 she learned to make dolls from Harold Pfeiffer and to do beadwork. At the end of her hospital stay, her crafts attracted the attention of a civil administrator and pioneer Inuit art promoter James Archibald Houston and his wife alma who encouraged her to persevere with her artistic activities. Houston introduced print-making to Cape Dorset artists in the 1950s, and he and his wife began marketing Inuit arts and crafts, including an exhibit of Inuit art in 1959. James Houston wrote about this time in 1999 : she was hesitant at first, claiming that she could not draw and that drawing was a man's business. Yet the next time that she visited the Houstons, the sheets of paper that Alma had given her were filled with pencil sketches. In 1958, her first print, Rabbit Eating Seaweed, was produced from one of her designs on a sealskin bag, and by 1959 Kenojuak and other Cape Dorset Inuit had formed the West Baffin Eskimo Cooperative as a senlavik (workshop) for aspiring Inuit artists, later known as Kinngait Studios. Fellow members included Pitaloosie Saila, Mayoreak Ashoona, and Napatchie Pootagook.

The first woman to take part in the printmaking workshop in Cape Dorset, Kenojuak soon found success : her work was soon recognized internationally. First displayed in art catalogs, her works were later exhibited in art galleries. In 1970, Kenojuak and her husband created a mural for the World Expo in Osaka. She became a member of the Royal Canadian Academy of Arts in 1974, and a member of the Order of Canada in 1982. In 2002, her work was exhibited at the National Gallery of Canada in the exhibition Kenojuak Ashevak: To make something beautiful. She received the Governor General's Award in Visual and Media Arts in 2008, and became a member of the Order of Nunavut in 2012.

=== Reception of her work in Southern Canada ===
Her reception in southern Canada was in fact rapidly favourable : Rabbit Eating Seaweed was Ashevak's first print, part of a debut exhibition of Inuit graphics. The young woman from the remote Canadian North was an immediate success, said Christine Lalonde, an expert in Inuit art with the National Gallery of Canada. "She had her own sense of design... She was already willing to let the pencil go, because she had the hand and the eye co-ordination to make the image she already had in her head." The National Gallery owns several copies of The Enchanted Owl, including the original pencil sketch from 1960. That sketch reveals much, said Lalonde. "It's a very simple drawing — pencil on pulp paper. But you can see even then how confident and sure her line was as she was making the curves of the fanning feathers."

In 1963, she was the subject of a National Film Board of Canada documentary by producer John Feeney, Eskimo Artist: Kenojuak, about Kenojuak, then 35, and her family, as well as traditional Inuit life on Baffin Island. The film showed a stonecutter carving her design into a relief block in stone, cutting away all the non-printing surfaces; she would then apply ink to the carved stone, usually in two or more colours, and carefully make 50 "shadow" prints for sale. With the money she earned from the film, Johnniebo was able to purchase his own canoe and become an independent hunter to help provide for the family, which now included a new daughter, Aggeo, and an adopted son, Ashevak.

National Gallery of Canada art expert Christine Lalonde marvelled at her confident artistry: "When you see her, you realize she doesn't use an eraser. She just sits down and she starts to draw."

Ashevak created several pieces of work to commemorate the creation of Nunavut, the third Canadian Territory, including a piece commissioned by the Department of Indian and Northern Affairs, Nunavut Qajanatuk (Our Beautiful Land) for the signing of the Inuit Land Claim Agreement in Principle in April 1990; Nunavut, a large hand-coloured lithograph to commemorate the signing of the Final Agreement early in 1994; a large diptych titled Siilavut, Nunavut (Our Environment, Our Land) in April 1999, when the Territory officially came into being.

The work of Ashevak Kenojuak can be found in the collections of Canada's National Gallery of Art, the Art Gallery of Ontario, and the Burnaby Art Gallery.

Kenojuak became the first Inuk artist inducted into Canada's Walk of Fame in 2001, and travelled to Toronto with her daughter, Silaqi, to attend the ceremony.

Up until her death, Kenojuak contributed annually to the Cape Dorset Annual Print Release and continued to create new works. She was one of the last living artists from the West Baffin Eskimo Cooperative.

A CBC report of Kenojuak's death characterized her as a person of unfeigned humility and simplicity:

Okpik Pitseolak, an artist from Cape Dorset who knew her personally, said Kenojuak Ashevak brought Inuit art to the world but was "very humble about her work." Pitseolak said that when she appeared on the radio to talk about her art, she didn't want to come across "as someone who brags" about it. But she was "thankful for the fact that she was given this gift." — CBC News

Since her death, prices for Kenojuak's work have reached new records, including $59,000 paid for a copy of Rabbit Eating Seaweed.

== Style ==
Kenojuak described her work thus in 1980:

"I just take these things out of my thoughts and out of my imagination, and I don't really give any weight to the idea of its being an image of something.... I am just concentrating on placing it down on paper in a way that is pleasing to my own eye, whether it has anything to do with subjective reality or not. And that is how I have always tried to make my images, and that is still how I do it, and I haven't really thought about it any other way than that. That is just my style, and is the way I started and the way I am today."

=== Stained glass ===
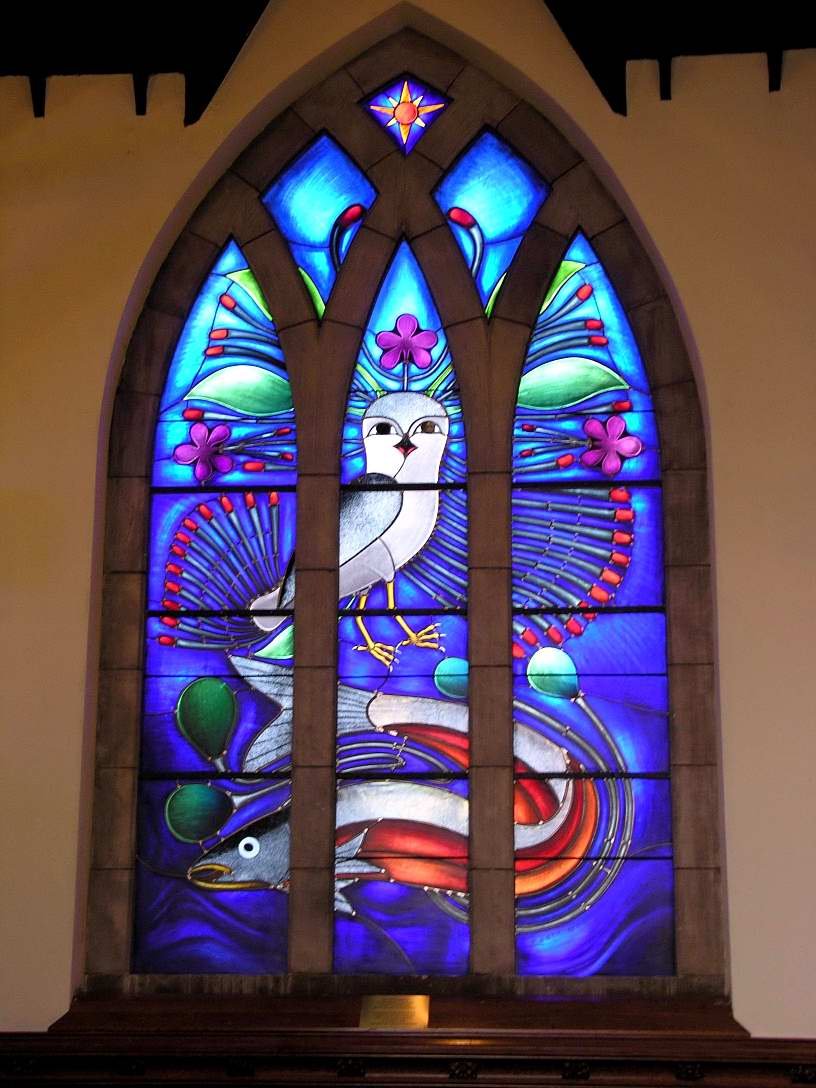
Window of John Bell Chapel (Appleby College, Oakville near Toronto; designed in 2004).

In 2004, Kenojuak designed a stained glass window for a chapel at Appleby College in Oakville, Ontario. The window, of an Arctic char along with an owl against a vibrantly blue background, is the first such window made by an Inuk artist; it was suggested by two Biblical stories in which Jesus feeds a large crowd of people with two fish and a few loaves of bread, which for Kenojuak thoroughly embodied the spirit of the Inuit community, where food is always shared. The window was dedicated by Andrew Atagotaaluk, Bishop of the Arctic, on November 9, 2004, celebrating the 75th anniversary of John Bell Chapel.

== Public collections ==
Her work is included in the collection of the Art Museum at the University of Toronto, St. Lawrence University, the National Gallery of Canada, the Metropolitan Museum of Art, the Brooklyn Museum and the Smithsonian's National Museum of the American Indian.

== Honours ==
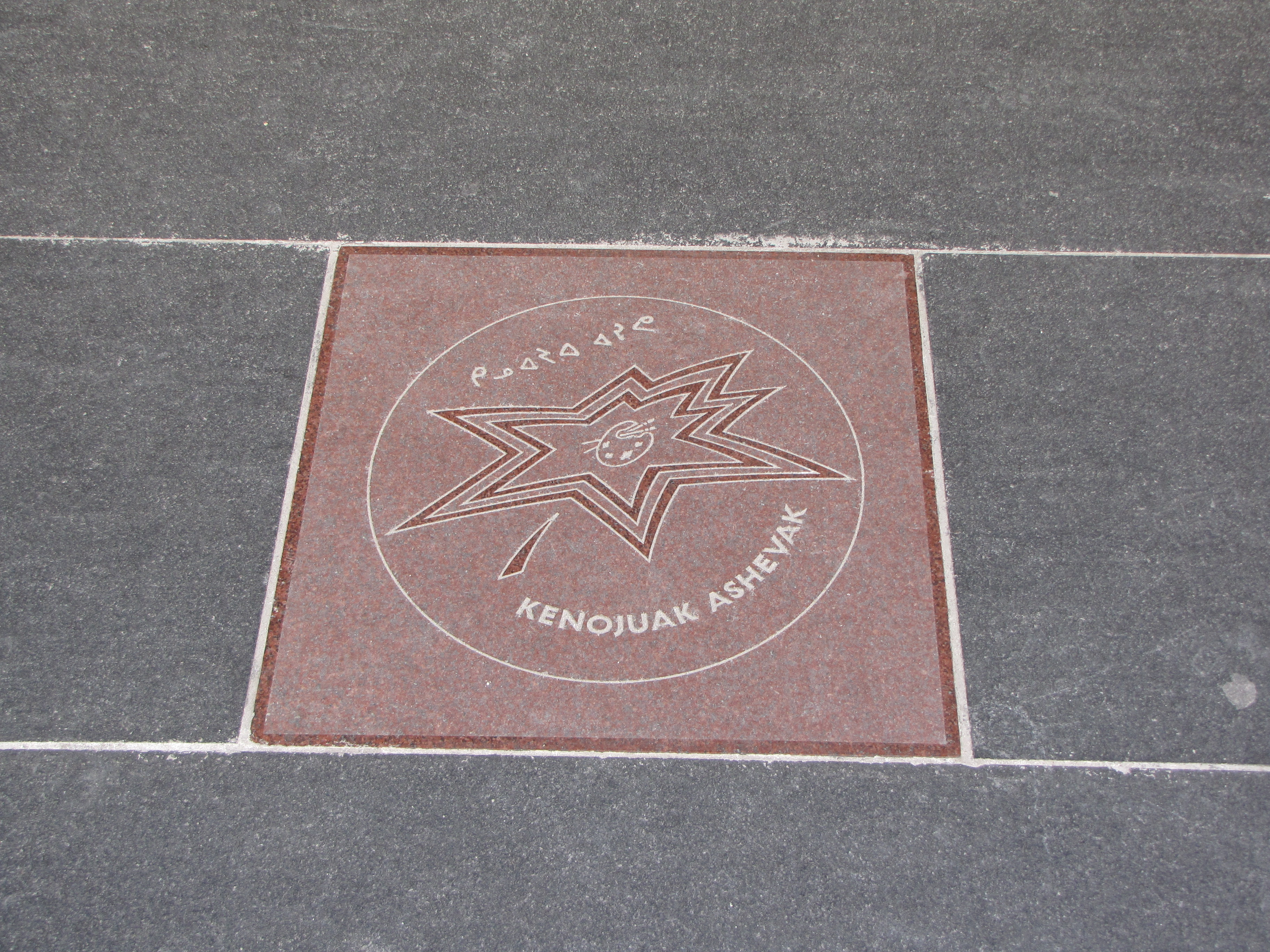
Ashevak's star on Canada's Walk of Fame.

- In 1967, she was made an Officer of the Order of Canada and was promoted to Companion in 1982.
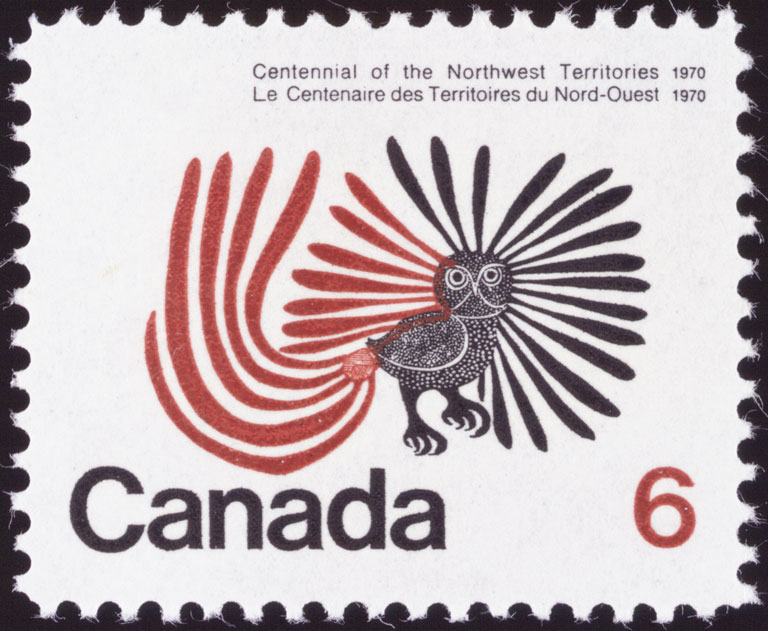
- Enchanted Owl stamp
  In 1970, Canada Post placed her 1960 print Enchanted Owl on a stamp to commemorate the centennial of the Northwest Territories.
- In 1974, she was elected a member of the Royal Canadian Academy of Arts.
- In 1980, Canada Post used her 1961 print Return of the Sun on a seventeen-cent stamp as part of its Inuit postage stamp series.
- In 1982, she has appointed a Companion of the Order of Canada.
- In 1991, she received an honorary doctorate from Queen's University.
- In 1992, she was awarded an honorary doctorate from the University of Toronto.
- In 1993, Canada Post featured 1969 drawing The Owl on a stamp for its Masterpieces of Canadian Art series.
- In 1999, a famous piece of hers, the "Red Owl" was featured on the April issue of the 1999 Millennium quarter series. Her initials in Inuktitut were on the left of the design, the first time the language had appeared on circulation coinage.
- In 2001, she was inducted into Canada's Walk of Fame.
- In 2004, she created the first-ever Inuk-designed stained glass window for the John Bell Chapel at Appleby College in Oakville, Ontario.
- In 2008, she received the renowned $25,000 Governor General's Award in Visual and Media Arts from the Canada Council of the Arts.
- In 2012, she was appointed a member of the Order of Nunavut.
- In 2017, the Bank of Canada unveiled a commemorative $10 banknote in honour of Canada's 150th birthday; Ashevak's print Owl's Bouquet is featured on the note.

== Legacy ==
In 2020, Cape Dorset Fine Arts organized the touring exhibition Kenojuak Ashevak: Life and Legacy.

At the Heffel Auction, Post-War & Contemporary Art, November 20, 2024, LOT 008, The Enchanted Owl, stonecut on paper 24 x 26 in, 61 x 66 cm, Estimate: $125,000 - $175,000 CAD, Sold for: $289,250 (including Buyer's Premium).

=== In popular culture ===
External videos
- " Kenojuak Ashevak" – Historica Canada. - Heritage Minutes (1:00 min)

The search engine Google showed a special doodle on its Canadian home page on October 3, 2014, for Kenojuak Ashevak's 87th Birthday.

On October 19, 2016, a Heritage Minute was released by Historica Canada. For the first time ever, the Heritage Minute is also narrated in a language other than French or English, in this case Inuktitut. Her granddaughter narrates the Heritage Minute, as well as appearing in it with her family. It was premiered in Cape Dorset, Nunavut, where it was also filmed.

=== Films ===
- In 1963, she was featured in the National Film Board of Canada documentary Eskimo Artist: Kenojuak, directed by John Feeney, which was nominated for an Academy Award for Documentary Short Subject in 1964. (Note on title: Feeney had suggested using the term "Inuit" in place of "Eskimo," but in 1963 it had been rejected as an unfamiliar term to non-Inuit audiences)
- 1992, archival and contemporary footage of Kenojuak was featured in Momentum, Canada's film for Expo '92.

== See also ==
- List of inductees of Canada's Walk of Fame
- Indigenous Canadian personalities
- Inuit printmaking
