= Tim Pitsiulak =

Canadian Inuk artist (1967-2016)

Timootee "Tim" Pitsiulak (10 March 1967 – 23 December 2016) was an Inuk artist and hunter based in Nunavut, Canada, best known for his large coloured-pencil drawings of Arctic scenery, wildlife, and Inuit culture.

== Early life ==
Timootee Pitsiulak was born in Lake Harbour (now Kimmirut), Northwest Territories, now the Canadian territory of Nunavut. His parents were Napachie and Timila Pitsiulak. He was the nephew of the artist Kenojuak Ashevak.

Pitsiulak grew up speaking Inuktitut and learned English in school. He became interested in drawing when he was about nine. He trained as a carver and then a jeweler at Nunavut Arctic College, before focusing on drawing as a career.

== Art career ==
Pitsiulak was based in Cape Dorset, Nunavut, where he worked as a hunter while making jewelry, sculptures, lithographs, and photographs, and large coloured-pencil drawings, the last of which is best known for. His subjects were Arctic wildlife and scenery, and traditional and modern Inuit culture. His work is in the collections of institutions such as Feheley Fine Arts and the Art Gallery of Ontario in Toronto, the Inuit Gallery in Vancouver, the University of Michigan Museum of Art, the National Gallery of Canada, the Canadian Museum of History, and the Rockbund Art Museum.

In 2013 the Royal Canadian Mint featured a Pitsiulak drawing of two beluga whales and a bowhead whale on the Canada's 25-cent coin. His work combined traditional motifs with contemporary techniques.

== Death and legacy ==
Pitsiulak died at age 49 on 23 December 2016 while in the hospital, where he was receiving treatment for pneumonia. He left behind his wife Mary and seven children.
