= Rosemary Gilliat =

- Born: 22 August 1919; England
- Died: 10 December 2004 (aged 85); Cole Harbour, Nova Scotia, Canada
- Other names: Rosemary Cassandra Gilliat Eaton
- Occupation: Photographer
- Known for: Photojournalist who documented Canada in the 1950s and 1960s.

Rosemary Gilliat (22 August 1919 – 10 December 2004) was an English photojournalist who traveled across Canada, documenting people and events for publications such as Weekend magazine and the National Film Board of Canada.

== Biography ==
=== Early life and photographic training ===
Rosemary Gilliat was raised by her father on his tea plantation in Ceylon. She was educated in Geneva, Switzerland under the supervision of her grandmother and later, at age 16, in Germany. Although she had an interest in photography since receiving her first camera, a Brownie, at age 8, it was while in Germany, in 1936–1937, that she secured her first work as a photographer, selling her images for book illustrations. In 1938, she moved to London, England to live with her brother and was able to secure further photographic work, supplying images for various press agencies until being sent out of the city due to bombing in 1940. After the Second World War, she continued working as a photographer in London and further developed her skills, with training in fashion and commercial photography from English photographer Bill Brandt. Her work appeared in magazines such as the Sunday Observer, and provided illustrations for history and architectural books.

=== Photographic career in Canada ===
Gilliat worked primarily as a freelance photographer, between the years 1953 and 1964. Her first assignment that required her to leave Ottawa was for the Husdon's Bay Company's magazine The Beaver, for which she travelled to Dawson City, Yukon in 1953. During her career she also put photo stories together for Weekend magazine, Star Weekly (a photo insert for the Toronto Star), Canadian Geographic and Maclean's, and also completed assignments for several government departments, including the Department of Northern Affairs and the National Film Board of Canada's Still Photography Division. She documented such topics and locations as: James Houston and the Eskimo Art Co-op; modern Inuit life; Trans Canada Highway; the St. Lawrence Seaway (1954); Seagrams; Neuchâtel Junior College (1956); and the Calgary Stampede.

=== Personal life and practice ===
In 1952, Gilliat emigrated to Canada and settled in Ottawa. This was considered an unusual choice at the time, particularly for a single woman. In 1963, she married Mike Eaton, a hydrographer, and they moved to Cole Harbour, Nova Scotia in 1965.

Though Gilliat is largely known for her photojournalism, she has produced notable other works created through her personal life or social network. In Photography in Canada, 1839 - 1989: An Illustrated History, historians Sarah Bassnett and Sarah Parsons identify a number of 'remarkable' photographs taking during a cross-country camping trip in 1954. Bassnett and Parsons note that these works came from a desire to protect family and community histories, rather than a to obtain success as a career artist.

Gilliat's photographic career was curtailed by ill-health in 1963, when she developed a problem with her inner-ear.

She died in 2004, in Cole Harbour. Her archive of professional and personal work was acquired by Library and Archives Canada in 2008.

== Bibliography ==
- Photography in Canada, 1839 - 1989: An Illustrated History by Sarah Bassnett and Sarah Parsons from the Art Canada Institute.
- Monk, Lorraine. The Female Eye / Coup d'oeil feminine. (Ottawa: National Film Board, Still Photography Division, 1975).
- Payne, Carol. A Canadian Document / Un document Canadien (Ottawa: Canadian Museum of Contemporary Photography, 1999).
- Payne, Carol. The Official Picture: The National Film Board of Canada's Still Photography Division and the Image of Canada (Montreal: McGill-Queen's University Press, 2013). ISBN 978-0773541450
- Eaton, Rosemary. "Hunting Pressures on Nova Scotia's Large Mammals" Nature Canada 4:23 (July–September 1975).
