= Dorothy Harley Eber =

Canadian historian (1925–2022)

Dorothy Margaret Eber, CM (née Harley; March 18, 1925 – August 16, 2022) was a British-born Canadian author and one of the first people to transcribe and publish oral histories of Inuit in Nunavut in both English and Inuktitut.

During the 1970s, she was one of the first writers to record their oral history on tape. She then completed the first oral biography of an Inuk, Pitseolak Ashoona, based on first hand accounts. Printed in both English and Inuktitut, it is said that Pitseolak: Pictures out of my Life was the first book, after the Bible, to be published in the Inuit language. Her multiple other works, including films and exhibitions, as well as her written material, have provided Canadians with a better understanding of Inuit culture.

She was invited regularly to present at museums and cultural institutions worldwide, international conferences, and has contributed articles to international journals. She served on committees to judge annual Inuit art competitions.

== Biography ==
Eber was born in Bromley, England of Welsh and Nova Scotian parentage, she spent her early childhood in both Wales and England. She attended schools in Wales, England, Ontario and Nova Scotia's Edgehill School for Girls. She was also a graduate of the University of Toronto. After graduation she worked as a reporter and in 1968 made her first trip to the Arctic to the community of Cape Dorset, famous for its Inuit artists. She returned in 1970 to do interviews with the graphic artist Pitseolak Ashoona. The book, with Ashoona's drawings and prints, was published the next year and has never been out of print. She undertook many more interview projects in the North.

Tapes for her interviews are deposited in the Canadian Museum of Civilization, Ottawa. Over two summers, she also interviewed many elderly residents of Baddeck, Nova Scotia, who worked with Alexander Graham Bell on the hydrofoil and the tetrahedral kites which he developed there after the telephone made him famous. Her book Genius at Work: Images of Alexander Graham Bell was published in 1982 by Viking Press, New York and later by Nimbus, Halifax, Nova Scotia.

== Death ==
Eber died from pneumonia in Oakville, Ontario, on August 16, 2022, at the age of 97.

== Selected bibliography ==
- Eber, Dorothy Harley (1 October 2008). Encounters on the Passage: Inuit Meet the Explorers. University of Toronto Press. ISBN 978-1-4426-1103-0.
- —— (October 1997). Images of Justice: A Legal History of the Northwest Territories and Nunavut As Traced Through the Yellowknife Courthouse Collection of Inuit Sculpture. McGill-Queen's University Press. ISBN 978-0-7735-1675-5.
- —— (1989). When the Whalers Were Up North: Inuit Memories from the Eastern Arctic. McGill-Queen's University Press. ISBN 978-0-7735-0702-9.
- ——; Ashoona, Pitseolak (January 2004). Pitseolak: Pictures Out of My Life (2nd ed.). McGill-Queen's University Press. ISBN 978-0-7735-2572-6.
- ——; Pitseolak, Peter (April 1978). People from Our Side: A Life Story with Photographs and Oral Biography. Indiana University Press. ISBN 978-0-253-34334-5.
- —— (October 1991). Genius at Work: Images of Alexander Graham Bell. Nimbus Publishing. ISBN 978-0-921054-67-2.
- —— (1969). The Computer Centre Party: Canada Meets Black Power. Tundra Books of Montreal.
