= K.M. Graham =

Canadian artist

Kathleen Margaret Graham
- Born: 1913; Hamilton, Ontario, Canada
- Died: August 26, 2008 (aged 94–95); Toronto, Ontario, Canada
- Education: Trinity College, Toronto
- Style: Abstract impressionism
- Spouse: Dr. Wallace Graham

Kathleen Margaret Graham RCA (1913–2008) was a Canadian abstract impressionist artist known for depicting colors and patterns she found in nature. She is known for becoming a painter at the age of 50, after her husband, Dr. Wallace Graham, died in 1962.

== Early life and education ==
Graham was born in Hamilton, Ontario, in 1913. She graduated from Trinity College at the University of Toronto with a degree in home economics in 1936. She never received a formal education or training in art.

== Art career ==
Graham was a museum docent at the Art Gallery of Toronto, where she became familiar with works by Piet Mondrian and American color field painters. During travels with her husband, she visited art galleries and museums, developing her love of art.

Encouraged by Jack Bush to paint, Graham had her first solo art exhibition in Toronto in 1967, at the Carmen Lamanna Gallery. In 1971, after visiting Cape Dorset in the Canadian Arctic, she shifted her focus to depicting the region's landscape. She worked closely with Inuk artist Lucy Qinnuayuak in 1973, introducing her to pastels and acrylic paint used in a watercolour style. In 1976, she returned as an artist in residence, and introduced other Inuit artists to the medium. One critic described her paintings as "playful, expansive, and unpretentious".

=== Recognition ===
Graham's paintings are part of the permanent collections at the National Gallery of Canada, the Art Gallery of Ontario, the McMichael Canadian Art Collection, and the British Museum. Graham's bequest of books has been turned into an art reference browsing collection within the John W. Graham library at Trinity College, University of Toronto.

Graham was a member of the Royal Canadian Academy of Arts and exhibited alongside her peers. She showed her work across North America and Europe. In 1998, Graham was made an honorary fellow of Trinity College.

== Personal life ==
After her marriage to Dr. Wallace Graham, in 1938, Graham spent the next several years raising their two children. Having always been inspired by nature, Graham continued canoeing, swimming, writing, and painting until she was 92. Graham died on August 26, 2008, in Toronto, at the age of 94 and suffering from Alzheimer's disease.
