= Annie Pootoogook =

Canadian Inuk artist (1969–2016)

Annie Pootoogook ᐊᓂ ᐳᑐᒍ
- Born: May 11, 1969; Cape Dorset, Northwest Territories, Canada; Presently Kinngait, Nunavut, Canada
- Died: September 19, 2016 (aged 47); Ottawa, Ontario, Canada
- Citizenship: Inuk and Canadian
- Awards: Sobey Art Award; 2006

Annie Pootoogook (Inuktitut: ᐊᓂ ᐳᑐᒍ, May 11, 1969 – September 19, 2016) was a Canadian Inuk artist known for her pen and coloured pencil drawings. In her art, Pootoogook often portrayed the experiences of those in her community of Kinngait (then known in English as Cape Dorset), in northern Canada, and memories and events from her own life.

== Early life and education ==
Annie Pootoogook was born on May 11, 1969, in Cape Dorset (now Kinngait), Canada. Pootoogook grew up in a family of artists all of whom worked out of the West Baffin Eskimo Co-operative, one of the first artist Co-ops established in the north in 1960. Her family worked in multiple mediums and styles and Pootoogook became interested in art at an early age. Her mother, Napachie Pootoogook, was a draftswoman and her father, Eegyvudluk Pootoogook, was a printmaker and stone sculptor. Pootoogook was the granddaughter of Pitseolak Ashoona a renowned graphic artist, the niece of printmaker Kananginak Pootoogook and the cousin of draftswoman Shuvinai Ashoona.

== Artistic career ==
Pootoogook began making art in 1997 at the age of 28. She developed her skills working alongside family members and Elders at the West Baffin Eskimo Co-operative in Cape Dorset, Nunavut. In her early career she was often told by the Co-op studio managers that her works about contemporary Inuit life, commenting on consumerism and southern influences in the north, would not sell because they went against the prevailing themes that the Co-op deemed to be of interest to the southern art market – namely, images from Inuit mythology or scenes from nature.

The 2000s were Pootoogook's most productive years. She had two exhibitions at Feheley Fine Arts in Toronto. The director of the gallery, Patricia Feheley, was the first dealer to showcase Pootoogook's work, initially in a group exhibition titled The Unexpected in 2001, and later, in a solo show titled Annie Pootoogook—Moving Forward: Works on Paper in 2003. This was her first solo exhibition and was important for her career because it made her name more widely known. It was between 2001 and 2007 that Pootoogook was the most prolific in her art making. During this time, she drew intimate home interior scenes depicting alcoholism, violence, and domestic abuse, the everyday experiences of a woman living in the Canadian north, the hardships faced by northern communities, and the impact of technology on traditional Inuit life. Pootoogook solidified her style and content during this period beginning to draw images that could be easily attributed to her.

After an extremely successful, eponymously named, solo show at The Power Plant Contemporary Art Gallery, in 2006, Pootoogook started to gain national attention outside of the art world and Inuit art market. She attended the important Glenfiddich Artists in Residence program, in Dufftown, Scotland. It was her first time out of the country and working outside of the regular hours of the Kinngait Studio. She found the experience isolating, but she produced a number of rich and important works while there. She worked as an independent artist during this period, leaving the West Baffin Eskimo Co-operative in 2001.

In 2006, after her residency, Pootoogook was named the first Inuk recipient of the prestigious Sobey Art Award. A new category was even created in order for her to be nominated: "Prairies & the North". In addition to the prize winnings of $50,000, Pootoogook received a show at the Montreal Museum of Fine Arts. With the new public recognition of her work and winnings, Pootoogook decided to stay in Montreal. She had a difficult time there without the support of the Co-op and her community. Although she returned to Kinngait for a few months, she soon moved south again, this time to the nation's capital, Ottawa, in hopes of more success. Pootoogook produced drawings documenting her life in the city, such as Annie and Andre (2009). In Ottawa, she worked with other Inuit artists and exhibited her drawings at SAW Gallery.

Over the course of her career, she created over 1,000 works on paper and it was during this time that she began to be recognized as an artist outside of the Inuit community.

=== Subject matter ===
Pootoogook was known for her drawings created in pen and coloured pencils that depict contemporary Inuit life. Inuit life and experiences influenced her career immensely, providing her with the subject matter that she would later render. Her work primarily focused on three subject types: the everyday experiences of women living in the Canadian north, the hardships faced by northern communities and the impact of technology on traditional Inuit life. In addition, her work often juxtaposes intimate home interior scenes with scenes of alcoholism, violence, and domestic abuse – lessening the safety of the home.

Her work is largely inspired by her mother Napachie Pootoogook and her grandmother Pitseolak Ashoona, both of whom are well known Inuit artists. Like her mother and grandmother, Pootoogook worked in the Inuit tradition of sulijuk which means "it is true." This means that she depicted life as she saw it without adding too much of her hand into the composition.

Pootoogook is noted for titling her work for exactly what they depict, e.g. "Man Abusing his Partner", where a man is shown abusing his wife.

=== Style ===
Pootoogook's compositions utilize minimal line drawings with figures posed in frontal or profile views. The artist utilizes one-point perspective to create the illusion of depth but manipulates this depth by flattening the perspective of the subjects. Her images often display large expanses of white space with muted colour schemes. Her work has been described as "rudimentary"' and "child-like" as it does not maintain any realism of form or space. According to art critics Bloom and Glasberg, "Her preferred medium of 'primitive' or child's crayon also refers back to the art market that has brought her recognition and success and suggests an untold story of pressured adaptation."

Pootoogook often included clocks in her work which has made them a motif that is associated with her work and allows for easy attribution. Her work captures a moment in time which is an important theme to Pootoogook. It is unknown why time plays an important role in Pootoogook's work. Nevertheless, the clock motif has been agreed upon by scholars to be artistically important to her work.

Pootoogook's compositions are not reproducible which acts against traditional printmaking practices of Inuit art in which copies are made to be sold and dispersed. Therefore, her work is not as widely represented as there is only one original copy of each work.

=== Dr. Phil ===
Annie Pootoogook's most notable work is Dr. Phil, which shows a young girl watching the American television show by the same name in her home in Kinngait, Nunavut. This composition is an archetypal drawing by Pootoogook which shows the influence of technology on northern communities. It also includes the clock motif and appears in a similar style to Pootoogook's other works. Pootoogook's use of a popular television personality made this composition well-liked in its own right. Traditionally, Inuit art often shows typical activities of northern communities such as hunting, fishing, and spiritual gatherings. Her use of non-traditional imagery appeals to contemporary art collectors who often are not interested in traditional Inuit art or practices of living.

== Recognition and awards ==
Pootoogook had her first major solo exhibition in 2006 when her work was displayed as part of a well-received show at The Power Plant in Toronto, Ontario. The exhibition, designed by Nancy Campbell, focused on mythology, Inuit communities and difficulties of life in the Arctic.

In November 2006 she won the Sobey Art Award and was granted the prize of $50,000 (CDN). The Sobey Award is granted to an artist who is 39 years of age or younger and has shown their work in a public or commercial gallery in Canada in the past 18 months, at the time of their application. The press release announcing Pootoogook's win noted that "her work reflects both the current moment of a specific tradition and of a contemporary drawing practice."

After winning the Sobey Award she continued to receive exposure. She exhibited in major art shows such as the Biennale de Montreal, Art Basel and Documenta 12. Pootoogook was the first Inuk artist to participate in Documenta – an exhibition of contemporary art held in Kassel, Germany.

From 2009 to 2010 her work was shown in solo exhibitions at multiple galleries including the Agnes Etherington Art Centre, (Kingston, Ontario), the National Museum of the American Indian, (Washington, D.C.) and the George Gustav Heye Centre, (Manhattan, New York). In 2010 her work was also exhibited at the Biennale of Sydney.

Pootoogook participated in one her last exhibitions in 2012 at the Massachusetts Museum of Contemporary Art. Curated by Denise Markonish, the exhibition titled Oh, Canada, showcased 62 Canadian artists including the work of Pootoogook's cousin Shuvinai Ashoona. Pootoogook was the only professional artist from the Ottawa region represented in the exhibition.

On November 7, 2021, the Annie Pootoogook Park was dedicated to the artist. This park is located next to the Sandy Hill Community Centre and the University of Ottawa, in Ottawa, Ontario. The dedication ceremony, held on International Inuit Day, was attended by several members of Pootoogook's family, including her nine-year-old daughter, Inuit elders and Canada's first Inuk Governor General, Mary Simon.

=== Collections ===
- Art Gallery of Ontario
- McMichael Canadian Art Collection
- Museum of Fine Arts Houston
- National Gallery of Canada

== Death ==
Annie Pootoogook drowned in the Rideau River in Ottawa on September 19, 2016, in what police declared as a suspicious death. Her body was a short walk from the shelter she had been staying in at the time. Two autopsies determined her cause of death to have been drowning, though it was never declared if somebody else had intentionally killed her.

After her death, Sergeant Chris Hrnchiar posted online comments that were condemned and labelled as racist, commenting that it was likely Pootoogook's death was due to alcoholism or drug abuse because of her ethnicity. He preemptively declared "it's not a murder case" on social media. An investigation into Hrnchiar's conduct was undertaken as a result. In November 2016, Hrnchiar pleaded guilty to two counts of discreditable conduct under the Police Services Act, and for making comments on an open investigation.

Annie Pootoogook's body was sent back to Cape Dorset where a funeral was held in her home village. The service was performed entirely in her native language of Inuktitut. Pootoogook's youngest daughter was able to go the funeral and this was the first time she met her extended Inuit family.
