= Kiugak Ashoona =

Canadian Inuk artist (1933–2014)

Kiugak Ashoona OC RCA
- ᑭᐅᒐᒃ ᐊᓲᓇ
- Born: September 16, 1933; Tariugajak on Baffin Island, Northwest Territories (now Nunavut)
- Died: 2014 (aged 80–81)
- Education: self-taught

Kiugak Ashoona (September 16, 1933 – 2014; also known as Kiawak; Inuktitut syllabics: ᑭᐅᒐᒃ ᐊᓲᓇ) was a Canadian Inuk artist renowned for his sculptural work and his expansive artistic portfolio. He experienced the longest career of any Cape Dorset artist, and is a member of the Order of Canada and the Royal Canadian Academy of Arts. In 1999, he was awarded the Canada Council Molson Prize for his outstanding lifetime contribution to the cultural and intellectual life of Canada.

== Early life ==
Kiugak was born to Inuk artist Pitseolak and her husband, Ashoona, in the community of Tariugajak on Baffin Island, Northwest Territories (now Nunavut), on September 16, 1933. He was one of the last generations to be born on the land and raised with the traditional lifestyle of the Inuit. In 1945, after the death of his father, Kiugak's mother relocated her family to the community of Cape Dorset, over 200 km (120 mi) away, to be closer to relatives. Pitseolak and her children were introduced to the carving trade in Cape Dorset. In 1947, Kiugak's first carving made from walrus tusk was traded to the Baffin Trading Company by his brother, Qaquq, for some large biscuits. As art grew as a new economic opportunity and hunting declined, Kiugak, like many Inuit, transitioned from hunting to creating and selling carvings. His work focused primarily on scenes of Inuit life, such as hunting scenes, mothers and children, as well as creatures of myth or fantasy.

== Artistic career ==
In 1951, Kiugak was introduced to James Houston, an artist from southern Canada who was sent to Cape Dorset to collect Inuit carvings for the Canadian Arts and Craft's Guild. Houston and Kiugak worked together to expand carving in the community.

Sometime in the 1950s, Kiugak married Punisti in Igali, a community east of Cape Dorset. He lived with her father Kiakshuk, a renowned angakkuq (shaman) and artist. During this time Kiugak became aware of the shamanic culture and history and incorporated these themes into his later work. After Punisti's death, Kiugak married graphic artist Sorosiluto in 1960, and had multiple children, both natural and adopted. His eldest child is contemporary Inuk artist Shuvinai Ashoona (born 1961).

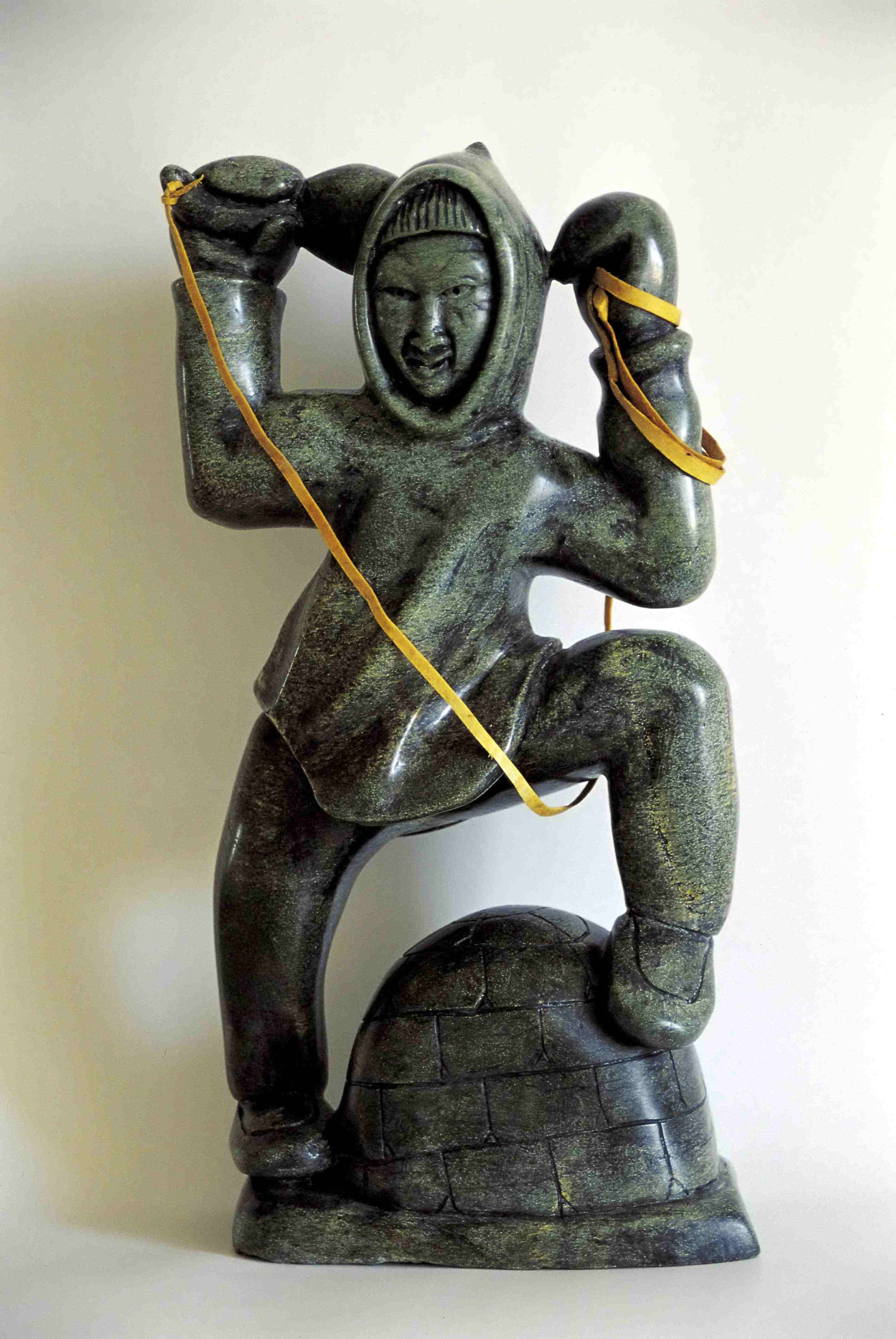
Giant Destroying Iglu, Serpentine & leather (1999) by Kiugak Ashoona

Kiugak Ashoona is a self-taught artist. During his childhood, he would often create drawings using pencil with little influence from others in his life. During the 1940s, Kiugak began creating sculptures out of ivory. After meeting with Houston, Kiugak transitioned to stone sculpture as this was widely popular in southern art markets. Many of his sculptures at this time were of more naturalistic human figures with themes of hunting and other traditional Inuit activities. In the early 1960s, he took a great interest in conveying Inuit mythology and shamanism through his sculpture.

While Kiugak is most famous for his carvings, he experimented in other mediums such as drawing, painting, and printmaking. He first began printmaking in 1962, using stone-cut engraving. From 1977 to 1981, Kiugak took an interest in acrylic painting, basing his style off Kingmeata Etidlooie, one of the first artists in Cape Dorset to take up this medium. In 1980, Kiugak created drawings using graphite and a combination of coloured pencil and felt-tip pen. During this time, he experimented with creating photorealistic drawings, but ultimately stopped because it was difficult to transfer such detailed drawings into stone carvings.

Prior to his death in 2014, Kiugak had the longest artistic career of any artist living in Cape Dorset. Along with his many awards and honours, his sculpture Sedna was featured on a Canadian postal stamp in 1980 as part of a series celebrating Inuit culture. Kiugak's work has been featured in over 75 exhibits both within Canada and internationally.

His work is held in several museums, including the Museum of Modern Art, the McCord Museum, the University of Michigan Museum of Art, the National Gallery of Canada, the Metropolitan Museum of Art, the McMichael Canadian Art Collection, Kleinburg, Ontario and the British Museum.

== Awards and honours ==
Kiugak received multiple honours including:

- National Aboriginal Achievement Award (1997)
- Canada Council for the Arts Molson Prize (1999)
- Officer of the Order of Canada (2000)"Mr. Kiawak Ashoona, C.M. The Governor General of Canada". Governor General of Canada.
- Appointed to the Royal Canadian Academy (2001)
- Queen Elizabeth II's Golden Jubilee Medal (2002)
- Nunavut Commissioner's Art Award (2009)
- Queen Elizabeth II's Diamond Jubilee Medal (2012)

== See also ==
- Napachie Pootoogook, Kiugak Ashoona's sister
