= Pitaloosie Saila =

Canadian Inuk artist (1942–2021)

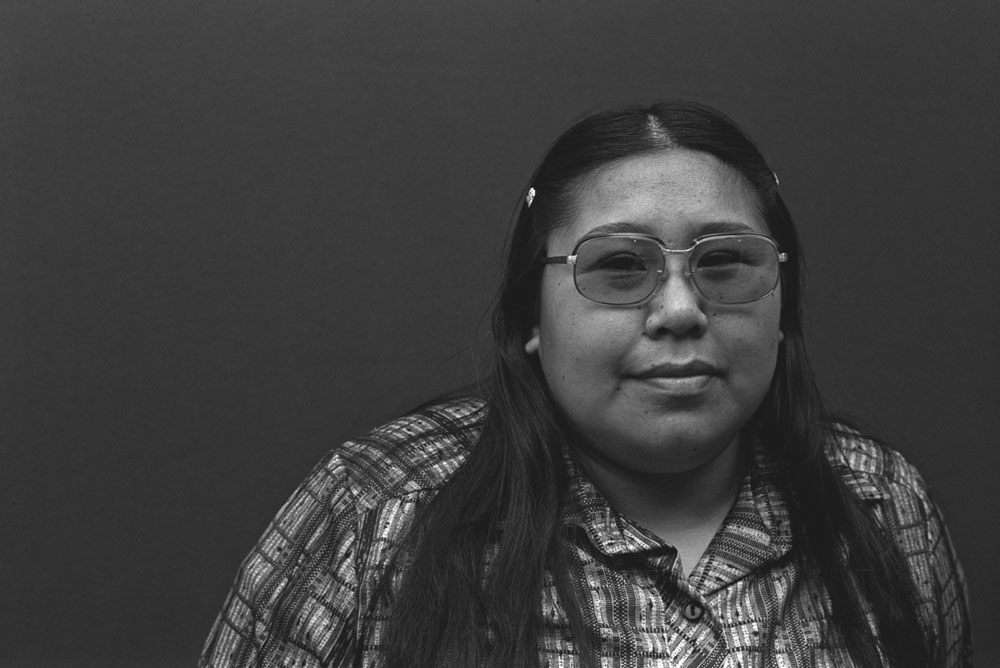
- Pitaloosie Saila in 1980
- Born: July 11, 1942; Cape Dorset, Canada
- Died: July 24, 2021 (aged 79); Kinngait, Nunavut, Canada
- Known for: Inuk artist
- Spouse: Pauta Saila (m. 1960; died 2009)

Pitaloosie Saila RCA (July 11, 1942 – July 24, 2021) was a Canadian Inuk graphic artist who predominantly made drawings and lithograph prints. Saila's work often explores themes such as family, shamanism, birds, and her personal life experiences as an Inuk woman. Her work has been displayed in over 150 exhibitions nationally and internationally, such as in the acclaimed Isumavut exhibition called "The Artistic Expression of Nine Cape Dorset Women". In 2004, Pitaloosie Saila and her well-known husband and sculptor Pauta Saila were both inducted into the Royal Canadian Academy of Arts.

== Early life ==
Saila was born on July 11, 1942,; however, several galleries give her birth day at August 11, 1942. She was born in Kinngait, or Cape Dorset, in what was then Northwest Territories (now Nunavut) in Canada. Her parents were Sam Pudlat and Katauga. She spent much of her childhood in hospitals in Quebec and Ontario, for treatment of tuberculosis. She learned English through her hospital stays, and often served as translator for her neighbours. Her mother died when she was two years old while her father was away on a walrus hunt, and she was raised by her grandmother. She has stated that it was difficult for her to relearn Inuktitut once she returned to Baffin Island in 1957, at the age of 15.

A graphic artist widely known for her 113 stunning images featured in Cape Dorset print collections since 1968, Pitaloosie Saila came from a family of extremely successful artists. Her husband Pauta Saila was a highly respected sculptor, and her stepmother, Mary Pudlat, has been a regular contributor to Cape Dorset print collections. Pitaloosie's two uncles, Pudlo Pudlat and Osoochiak Pudlat, have both gained considerable attention for their graphic works, and her father's famous cousin, Peter Pitseolak, was one of the first South Baffin Inuit to produce a sustained body of artistic work over an extended period of years.

== Art career ==
Saila began to draw in the early 1960s and immediately developed a personal style. She participated in an annual engraving collection in Cape Dorset since 1968. However, she began to draw completely on her own initiative in the early 1960s during the time that James Archibald Houston was at Cape Dorset, and her style was distinctively her own. She tended towards images of strong, nurturing women or mothers with their children, and frequently drew birds and mythical Taleelayu (or Sedna) figures as well. Pitaloosie Saila had numerous opportunities to travel in southern Canada and abroad in connection with her art. With Pauta Saila, she spent the summer of 1967 in Toronto with their family while Pauta executed a carving for the International Sculpture Symposium. In 1974, Pitaloosie attended the opening of her first solo exhibition in Hamilton, Ontario, and subsequent showings of her work took her to major cities in southern Canada, the United States and Europe.

== Recognition ==
In 1977, in recognition of the contribution of Inuit art to the cultural heritage of Canada, Canada Post used her 1971 print, Fisherman's Dream, as one of a series of four illustrated postage stamps. Her 1980 print, Arctic Madonna, was selected for a UNICEF greeting card in 1983.

Saila's works are included in some of the most important Inuit art collections, including those of the National Gallery of Canada, the Montreal Museum of Fine Arts (MMFA), the Winnipeg Art Gallery, and the Canadian Museum of History.

In 2004, she was elected a member of the Royal Canadian Academy of Arts.

== Notable exhibitions ==
- 2019 60/60, Feheley Fine Arts, Toronto
- 2016 Pitaloosie Saila: A Print Retrospective, Feheley Fine Arts, Toronto
- 2004 Sanaasimasiatok/Fine Works: Sculpture from Cape Dorset, Feheley Fine Arts, Toronto
- 2003 The Inuit Icon: Selections from Private Collections, Feheley Fine Arts, Toronto
- 1996-1997 Pitaloosie & Pauta, McMichael Canadian Art Collection, Kleinburg, ON
- 1994 – 1995 Isumavut: The Artistic Expression of Nine Cape Dorset Women, Canadian Museum of History, Gatineau, QC
- 1993 – 1994 Contemporary Inuit Drawings, Muscarelle Museum of Art, College of William and Mary, Williamsburg, VA
- 1991 – 1992 In Cape Dorset We Do It This Way: Three Decades of Inuit Printmaking, McMichael Canadian Art Collection, Kleinburg, ON
- 1989 – 1991 Kenojuak Ashevak, Lucy Qinnuayuak, Pitaloosie Saila – Flights of Fancy, Art Gallery of Ontario, Toronto
- 1988 – 1989 In the Shadow of the Sun: Contemporary Indian and Inuit Art in Canada, Canadian Museum of History, Gatineau, QC
