= Mary Pudlat =

Canadian Inuk artist (1923-2001)

- Born: 1923; Puvirnituq, Quebec
- Died: 2001 (aged 77–78)

Mary Pudlat (1923–2001) was a Canadian Inuk artist. She was born in Puvirnituq, Quebec, and married a Samuelie Pudlat in 1943, on Baffin Island. They were semi-nomadic before settling down in Cape Dorset in 1963. Mary Pudlat began to draw and sculpt soapstone in the 1960s and 1970s. When her husband died in 1979, she switched to full time drawing. Her art depicts aspects of native Inuit life, such as traditional hunting and fishing scenes.

== See also ==
- Janet Kigusiuq
- Agnes Nanogak
- Angotigolu Teevee
- Shuvinai Ashoona
