= Simeonie Quppapik =

Inuk artist (1909-1997)

- Born: 1909; Amadjuak
- Died: 1997 (aged 87–88)

Simeonie Quppapik (1909–1997) was an Inuk artist.

Quppapik grew up in Qamaarjuak (Amadjuak). When he was fourteen, he was photographed by Robert Flaherty.

His work is included in the collections of the National Gallery of Canada, Winnipeg Art Gallery, the Augustana Teaching Museum of Art, and the Museum of Anthropology at the University of British Columbia.
