= Napachie Pootoogook =

Canadian Inuk artist (1938–2002)

- ᓇᐸᓯ ᐳᑐᒍ
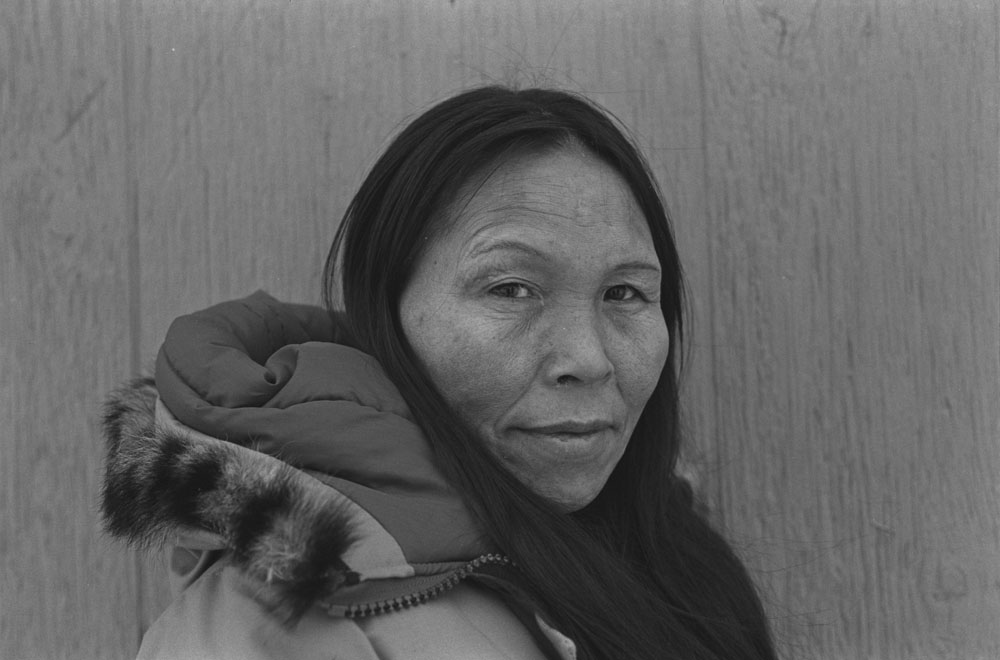
- Napatchie Pootoogook in 1980
- Born: Napachie Ashoona; June 26, 1938; Sarruq Island camp, Northwest Territories
- Died: December 18, 2002 (aged 64); Cape Dorset, Nunavut, Canada
- Known for: printmaking, drawing
- Spouse: Eegyvudluk Pootoogook

Napachie Pootoogook (June 26, 1938 – December 18, 2002) was a Canadian Inuk graphic artist.

== Life and family ==
Napachie Pootoogook is the only daughter of acclaimed artist Pitseolak Ashoona. She was born in the Sarruq Island camp near south Baffin Island. Her father, Ashoona, died while she was six or seven years old. After his death, Pootoogook, along with her mother and five brothers, lived a traditional nomadic Inuit lifestyle and survived with the support of their community to survive. With her mother's encouragement, Napachie began drawing in her early twenties, developing her own unique style and viewpoint. Her brothers, Kiugak and Qaqaq Ashoona, are well known sculptors. As well, two of her sisters-in-law, Mayureak and Sorosiluto Ashoona are well known graphic artists.

In the mid-1950s, Napachie entered into an arranged marriage with Eegyvudluk Pootoogook, an Inuk printmaker and carver, although the difficulties she saw in her parents' arranged marriage originally made her hesitant. The two were married in Kaiktuuq, Nunavut, then moved to Cape Dorset where they lived for most of their marriage, except for two years spent living in Iqaluit. Pootoogook and her husband had eleven children, several of whom died young. Two children died in a house fire in the early 1960s, and one of their daughters drowned soon after. Continuing the family's artistic legacy, their surviving daughter, Annie Pootoogook, grew up to be an important contemporary Inuk artist known for her prints and drawings. In her lifetime, Napachie was made a grandmother to many grandchildren.

Pootoogook's only written and spoken language was Inuktitut.

== Work ==
Pootoogook began drawing in her early twenties with her mother's encouragement. Like many Inuit artists, she brought her drawings to the Cape Dorset-based West Baffin Eskimo Co-operative (now known as the Kinngait Co-operative), an institution that would purchase artworks and offered art classes. Pootoogook sold her first drawings to James Archibald Houston for $20 when she was twenty-five years old.

She continued to draw and make prints until her death, producing more than 5000 original works.

Pootoogook's art was included in fourteen Cape Dorset print collections and has been featured in many anthologies of Inuit art since the 1960s.

=== Inspiration and themes ===
Much of Pootoogook's early work documented traditional Inuit spirituality, mythology and superstitions. In the 1970s, she began using her art to document traditional Inuit life and clothing as well as local histories. The drawings created toward the end of her career told stories from her personal life and those of her ancestors, going back two generations. Some of those later pieces illustrated darker aspects of Inuit life – covering themes like spousal abuse, starvation, forced marriage and infanticide.

=== Techniques and methodologies ===
Pootoogook's drawings were primarily done with acrylic paints, black felt-tipped pens or pencil crayons.

Her artistic style changed after she completed courses in acrylic painting and drawing workshops at the West Baffin Co-operative in 1976. After taking those classes, her art featured more landscapes and "Western notions of spatial composition."

In her later career, when depicting events from her life, Pootoogook experimented with figure drawing and lithography.

== Artistic career ==
=== Exhibitions ===
In 1979, her work was included in an exhibition titled "Images of the Inuit from the Fraser Collection" at Simon Fraser University, British Columbia.

In 1981, her work was included in an exhibition titled "Eskimo Games: Graphics and Sculpture" at the Galleria Nazionale d'Arte Moderna in Rome, Italy, and a traveling exhibition titled "Arctic Vision: Art of the Canadian Inuit" organized by the Department of Indian and Northern Affairs in Ottawa.

In 1988, the University of Missouri included her work in an exhibition called "Inuit Women and their Art: Graphics and Wall-hangings."

In 1989, the Winnipeg Art Gallery included her work in an exhibition titled "Inuit Graphic Art from Indian and Northern Affairs Canada."

In 1999, the McMichael Canadian Art Collection staged an exhibition called, "Three Women, Three Generations: Drawings by Pitseolak Ashoona, Napachie Pootoogook & Shuvinai Ashoona".

In 2002, Albers Gallery of Inuit Art in San Francisco staged an exhibition of Pootoogook's art called "Napachie Pootoogook: Drawings."

In 2005, her work was shown alongside her daughter Annie Pootoogook's at Feheley Fine Arts Gallery in Toronto, Ontario. The exhibition, called "Windows on Kinngait", was the first time the two had their work displayed together outside of Cape Dorset.

In 2014, Feheley Fine Arts Gallery staged an exhibition of approximately 150 drawings done by Pootoogook from 1996–2001 in an exhibit called, "Napachie Pootoogook: True North."

In 2016, Pootoogook was curated into the exhibition "Akunnittinni: A Kinngait Family Portrait" along with her mother Pitseolak Ashoona and daughter Annie Pootoogook. Curated by Candice Hopkins at the Institute of American Indian Arts in Santa Fe.

=== Museum collections ===
Napachie Pootoogook's work is represented in the permanent collections of the Art Gallery of Greater Victoria, the Glenbow Museum in Calgary, the Museum of Anthropology, University of British Columbia in Vancouver, the Musée national des beaux-arts du Québec, the Royal Ontario Museum in Toronto, the Winnipeg Art Gallery, the Canadian Museum of Civilization in Ottawa, the University of Michigan Museum of Art, and the Metropolitan Museum of Art.

== Throat singing ==
In addition to her artistic capabilities, Pootoogook was also a talented throat singer. The 1993 documentary Quanak & Napachie documented Pootoogook's throat singing and her performance in Ottawa at a Canada Day celebration. Her throat singing was also featured in the film Glory & Honor.

== Death and legacy ==
Pootoogook died of cancer in Cape Dorset at the age of 64.

Her work is included in the collections of the Inuit Art Centre of Indigenous and Northern Affairs Canada, the Winnipeg Art Gallery, the Canadian Museum of History, the Royal Ontario Museum and the National Gallery of Canada, as well as private and public collections in Canada and the United States.
