= Shuvinai Ashoona =

Canadian Inuk artist (born 1961)

Shuvinai Ashoona ᓱᕕᓂ ᐊᓱᓇ
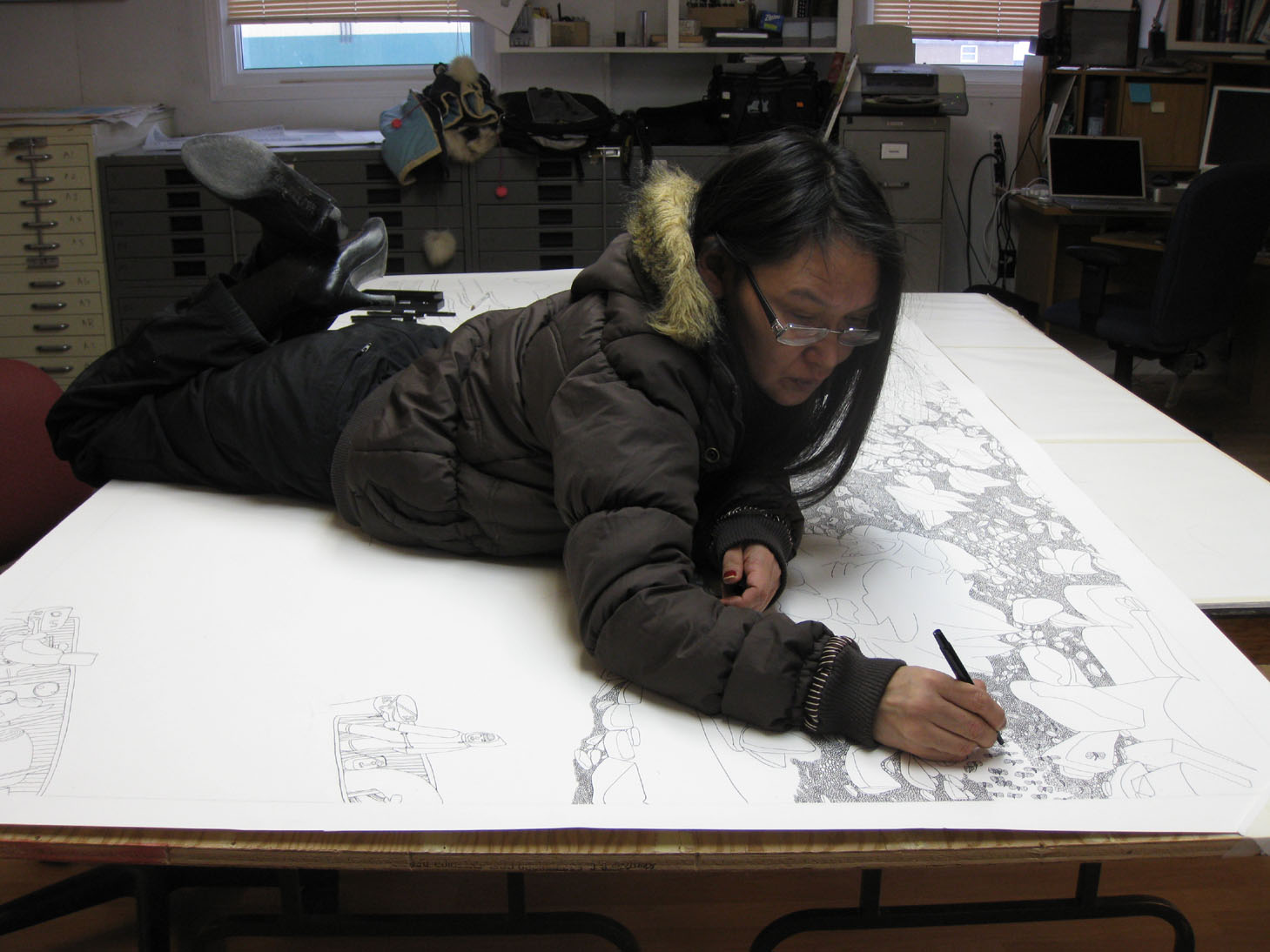
- Born: August 1961 (age 64); Cape Dorset, Northwest Territories (now Kinngait, Nunavut)
- Known for: Draughtsperson; graphic artist
- Awards: Gershon Iskowitz Prize (2018)

Shuvinai Ashoona RCA (Inuktitut: ᓱᕕᓂ ᐊᓱᓇ, born August 1961) is an Inuk artist who works primarily in drawing. She is known for her detailed pen and pencil drawings depicting northern landscapes and contemporary Inuit life.

== Biography ==
Ashoona was born in 1961 in Cape Dorset, Northwest Territories, now Kinngait, Nunavut, to a family of celebrated artists. Her father Kiugak Ashoona was a sculptor, her mother Sorosilooto Ashoona was a graphic artist and her grandmother Pitseolak Ashoona was one of the most acclaimed Inuit artists of her generation. She is also related to artists Napachie Pootoogook, her aunt, and Annie Pootoogook, her cousin, with whom she was selected to participate in the 2012 Massachusetts Museum of Contemporary Art, Oh, Canada a showcase of contemporary Canadian artists curated by Denise Markonish and held at the Massachusetts Museum of Contemporary Art. Ashoona attended high school in Iqaluit, but soon returned to the Kinngait region with her daughter, living with her family at outposts like Luna Bay and Kangiqsualujjuaq. This experience informs her detailed, animate drawings of Inuit Nunangat. The Ashoona family returned to Kinngait in the late 1980s, and Shuvinai began visiting Kinngait Studios. There her artistic style was influenced by her aunts and fellow studio members Napachie Pootoogook and Mayoreak Ashoona, as well as Kenojuak Ashevak.

== Artistic career ==
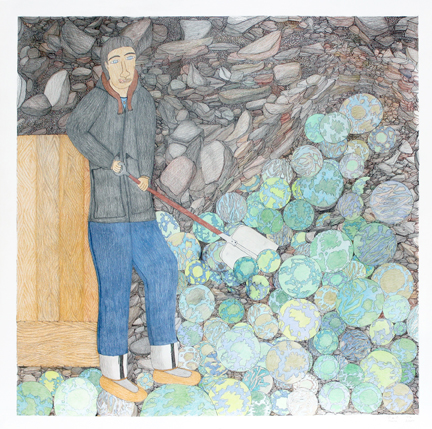
Shoveling Worlds acquired by the Art Gallery of Ontario in 2013

Ashoona's drawings are sometimes rooted in nature, but other times drawn from imagination, creating a claustrophobic, dense effect on paper. Recurring images include the egg shape; the kudlik, a stone oil lamp; and the ulu; historical images or events occasionally appear, like the Nascopie, a supply ship which brought goods and people to Cape Dorset until its sinking in 1947. Setting Ashoona's work apart from the Inuit artists before her is a reflection of the blending of modern and traditional life in Nunavut.

Her first drawings in the Kinngait Studios archives—the internationally renowned printmaking studio founded by the West Baffin Eskimo Cooperative in 1959—date from around 1993. Her early works were small, detailed, monochromatic landscape drawings, often depicting rocky, sparsely populated terrains from aerial perspectives. Ashoona's monochromes are densely rendered, stunningly intricate compositions in ink and black fineliner. These landscapes were partly realistic in depicting detailed topography around Cape Dorset (Kinngait) and partly fantasy, for example, elements such as stairs that emerge as land formations yet lead nowhere. In sharp contrast to the work of other Kinngait artists, these landscape views were largely devoid of human activity and were also unusual in their introspective quality, seemingly to mirror an interior world while illustrating an exterior one. Because of her painstaking drawing process, it took several years to develop a body of work substantial enough for exhibition. Although two small etchings were included in the 1997 annual Cape Dorset print collection, her first major exhibition was in 1999, Three Women, Three Generations: Drawings by Pitseolak Ashoona, Napatchie Pootoogook and Shuvinai Ashoona curated by Jean Blodgett at the McMichael Canadian Art Collection in Kleinburg, Ontario. One of six works from this period acquired by the National Gallery of Canada, Rock Landscape was also featured in the CBC radio series, All in a Day (One Treasure at a Time) in 2003.

She began using colour in her drawings in the early 2000s, portraying human figures, their shelters, and tools within graphic, imposing topographies, like in the work Composition (Sewage Truck) (2007–8) in the Samuel and Esther Sarick Collection of the Art Gallery of Ontario. Throughout her career the internal cosmology of her works has become more pronounced, with eggs, card suits, globes, and snatches of text surfacing over and over. Her collaborative work (with John Noestheden), Earth and Sky is a gigantic banner that debuted at Art Basel in 2009 in an installation complex called Stadthimmel ("Citysky"). It was also exhibited at the 2012 Biennale of Sydney "All Our Relations", and at the Justina M. Barnicke Gallery at the University of Toronto, paired with the Toronto-based artist Shary Boyle. Boyle and Ashoona went on to collaborate on the 2015 travelling exhibition Universal Cobra, building collaborative fantasy worlds, sharing space on the paper.

In roughly 2009, Ashoona began working with a motif of worlds, drawing human, animal, and hybrid figures interacting with blue and green planets within fantastical settings, as exhibited in Shuvinai's World(s) at Feheley Fine Arts in Toronto, September 2012. She has exhibited frequently with Feheley Fine Arts and Marion Scott Gallery in Vancouver.

== Exhibitions ==
Mapping Worlds, a survey of work by Shuvinai Ashoona, was organized and presented by The Power Plant (Toronto) in 2019. Described as her first major solo museum exhibition, Mapping Worlds continues to circulate in 2020, including at the Leonard and Bina Ellen Art Gallery at Concordia University (Montréal) and at the Vancouver Art Gallery. Outside of Canada, Holding on to Universes, an exhibition of her lesser known work was presented in 2020 at the Glasgow Centre for Contemporary Arts in Scotland.

== Recognition ==
Ashoona is the subject of a short documentary film titled Ghost Noise (2010), directed by Marcia Connolly and had the song "Midnight Sun" dedicated to her by musician Kevin Hearn, who she painted a guitar for.

In 2018, Ashoona received the Gershon Iskowitz Prize for her outstanding contribution to the visual arts in Canada. In 2024, she was awarded a Governor General's Awards in Visual and Media Arts.
