= Pitseolak Ashoona =

Canadian Inuk artist (1904–1983)

Pitseolak Ashoona CM RCA
- Born: c. 1904; Nottingham Island
- Died: May 28, 1983 (aged 78–79); Cape Dorset
- Known for: Graphic artist
- Spouse: Ashoona
- Awards: Order of Canada; 1977
- Elected: Royal Canadian Academy of Art; 1974

Pitseolak Ashoona (c. 1904 – May 28, 1983) was a Canadian Inuk artist admired for her prolific body of work. She was also a member of the Royal Canadian Academy of Arts.

== Biography ==
Pitseolak was born to Timungiak and Oootochie on Nottingham Island in the Northwest Territories, now Nunavut. Her name means "sea pigeon" in Inuktitut. She grew up in the traditional life of her people, with food dependent on hunting and gathering. Her culture relied on angakuit.

In 1922 (or 1923), Pitseolak married Ashoona, a hunter, in the Foxe Peninsula of Baffin Island. They had 17 children, though only six (Namoonie, Qaqaq, Kumwartok, Kiugak, Napachie, and Ottochie) lived with Pitseolak until adulthood. Some died in childhood, and others were adopted out according to custom, and raised by other Inuit families.

After her husband died at the age of 40 from a viral sickness, Pitseolak raised four of the children, Kumwartok, Qaqaq, Kiawak or Kiugak, and daughter Napachie Pootoogook, herself. Years of hardship followed the death of Ashoona, which occurred sometime in the early to mid 1940s. He died in the early years of the Second World War, a time of decline in the market for furs.

Over time the loss of Ashoona led Pitseolak to become an artist. Making prints eased her loneliness and she described her art as what made her "the happiest since he died". Pitseolak's artwork later enabled her to support her family. Though her art arose from painful circumstances, it expressed mostly positive memories and experiences. As Christine Lalonde notes in Pitseolak Ashoona: Life & Work: "scenes of deprivation and suffering almost never appear in her drawings, though certain images convey sadness and longing" about the passing of Ashoona.

Pitseolak is recognized as one of the first Inuit artists to create autobiographical works. Her art contained images of traditional Inuit life and contributed to the establishment of a modern Inuit art form, one that transmitted traditional knowledge and values while at the same time achieving worldwide popular and commercial success.

Pitseolak died on May 28, 1983, in Cape Dorset now Kinngait. She was survived by a large family of artists, including:

- Napatchie Pootoogook, daughter, graphic artist
  - Annie Pootoogook, (1969–2016), artist; granddaughter
- Qaqaq Ashoona ("Kaka") (1928–1996), elder son and sculptor
  - Ohitok, sculptor – grandson
- Kiugak Ashoona (1933–2014), son and sculptor
  - Shuvinai Ashoona, (born 1961) artist, granddaughter
- Kumwartok Ashoona, son and sculptor

== Artistic career ==
Pitseolak Ashoona was one of the first artists in the 1960s to make drawings for the print studio in Cape Dorset. She was a self-taught artist, who worked out solutions to artistic problems through what Lalonde described as "a self directed-program of repetitious drawing".

Initially Pitseolak worked sewing and embroidering goods for sale as part of the arts and crafts program. It was initiated by the Department of Northern Affairs and National Resources as a way for Inuit to earn money. It was introduced by James Archibald Houston and Alma Houston at Cape Dorset in 1956. Upon seeing the work of her cousin Kiakshuk (1886–1966), who was part of the Cape Dorset graphic studio, Pitseolak decided to take up drawing. Her early work was well received and she soon became one of the most popular artists among those creating images for the Cape Dorset print collection.

First working with graphite pencil, Pitseolak would later move on to coloured pencil and felt-tip pens. Lalonde said these became her favoured medium because their "rich and vibrant colours" best expressed "the joyfulness that characterizes her work".

Pitseolak's cousin, Kiakshuk, and Houston both inspired her to try her hand at drawing. She also worked on copper plates, but did not enjoy this technique.

In the last two decades of her life, from 1960 onwards, she produced a collection of more than 7,000 images, 233 of which were created as prints in her Cape Dorset Collection. She said these illustrated life pre-contact, "the things we did long ago before there were many white men."

Her artwork focuses on both daily life and legends, or Taleelayu. Pitseolak was inspired by other artists in her community who started before her, saying: "I don't know who did the first print, but Kiakshuk, Niviaksiak, Oshawetok and Tudlik were all drawing at the beginning. I liked the first prints ... because they were truly Eskimo." Pitseolak was accepted into the Royal Canadian Academy of Arts in 1974 and was awarded the Order of Canada in 1977 for her work.

Through the following decade and until her death in 1983, Pitseolak continued to draw, and to work with new media. An arts grant awarded to her in 1975 sparked experimentation in a new medium – acrylic paint on canvas. Initially, she approached painting like drawing, outlining in pencil and then filling in with colour. As she gradually adapted to the nuances of the medium, she began laying down bold colours side by side to achieve her vivid affect.

— The Pictures

Pitseolak found prints to be the most challenging, as she said in Dorothy Harley Eber's book Pitseolak: Pictures of My Life; "To make prints is not easy. You must think first and this is hard to do. But I am happy doing the prints." Though not active as a printmaker, Pitseolak experimented with drawing directly on copper plates and, to a lesser degree, lithographic stones.

In 1973 she narrated her story in the National Film Board's animated documentary Pictures out of My Life, directed by Bozenna Heczko and based on interviews from Eber's book. Pitseolak was also featured on a stamp, issued on March 8, 1993, and designed by Heather J. Cooper, in commemoration of International Women's Day.

Pitseolak's work has been featured in exhibitions at Canadian museums, including the National Gallery of Canada, the Winnipeg Art Gallery, the Art Gallery of Ontario, the Canadian museum of civilizations, and the Vancouver Art Gallery. In 1975 she had a retrospective at the Smithsonian Institution in Washington, D.C., organized by the Department of Indian and Northern Affairs Canada.

== Legacy ==
In 2020, Ashoona was one of eight finalists for the person to be depicted on $5 polymer bills in Canada.
