= James Archibald Houston =

Canadian artist, designer, children's author and filmmaker (1921 – 2005)

James Archibald Houston OC FRSA
- Born: June 12, 1921; St. Catharines, Ontario, Canada
- Died: April 17, 2005 (aged 83); New London, Connecticut, U.S
- Occupation: Author
- Writing career
- Genre: Children's literature

James Archibald Houston OC FRSA (June 12, 1921 – April 17, 2005) was a Canadian artist, designer, children's author and filmmaker who played an important role in the recognition of Inuit art and introduced printmaking to the Inuit. The Inuit named him Saumik, which means "the left-handed one".

== Biography ==
Born in St. Catharines, Ontario, James Houston studied art as a child with Arthur Lismer and was educated at the Ontario College of Art (1938–40), Académie de la Grande Chaumière in Paris (1947–48) and in Japan (1958–59) where he studied printmaking. He fought in World War II with the Toronto Scottish Regiment, receiving the Canadian Volunteer Service Medal. After the war, he went to the Eastern Arctic to paint and lived there for twelve years. He was a northern service officer and civil administrator of western Baffin Island. In 1962, he moved to New York and became associate director of design with Steuben Glass.

Moving effortlessly and with great success between different activities, perhaps his biggest accomplishment was his work in the Eastern Arctic of Canada, developing Inuit art. In 1948, Houston traveled to a small Inuit community in Arctic Quebec, Inukjuak (then Port Harrison), to draw and paint images of the Inuit and the Arctic landscape. He traded his own drawings, done on the spot, for a small carving, by an Inuk hunter named Nayoumealuk, of a seated deer. Houston recognized its aesthetic appeal and returned to the Canadian Handicrafts Guild, in Montreal, with roughly a dozen small carvings, done mostly in steatite. The guild, which had tried as early as the 1920s to foster an Inuit-handicrafts market, was impressed with the carving; they were equally impressed by Houston. The guild secured a federal government grant of $1,100 and sent Houston back north in the summer of 1949 to make bulk purchases in various communities in the Eastern Arctic.

When Houston returned to Montreal that fall, the guild mounted their first exhibition of Inuit carvings. According to collector Ian Lindsay, the first exhibition was a complete sell-out. The government put more resources into developing an art and handicrafts market in the Arctic, hiring Houston to live in Cape Dorset as the first "roving crafts officer", and tapping him to write promotional material for sales in the south. The guild's fall sales exhibitions became annual affairs, with lineups routinely stretching out the door and down the block on Peel Street. By the late 1950s, the Government had sponsored tours of Inuit art through Eastern and Western Europe, South America and the Middle East. After successfully launching Inuit sculpture, Houston introduced printmaking in 1957, which met with the same success.

Houston lived in Cape Dorset with his wife Alma Houston and his two sons, Samuel and John Houston until 1962, when the couple split and he moved to New York City. He was writer and producer of the 1974 film based on his novel, The White Dawn. In 1976, his 70-foot high acrylic and aluminum sculpture "Aurora Borealis" was installed in Calgary's new Glenbow Museum, where it was on display until 2021. (It was removed during extensive renovations, and will not return to its original site.) He died in New London, Connecticut, aged 83.

== Honours ==
- He was a Fellow of the Royal Society of Arts.
- He was an honorary member of the College of Fellows of the Royal Canadian Geographical Society.
- In 1972 he was made an Officer of the Order of Canada.
- In 1972 he was awarded a Doctor of Literature, honoris causa, from Carleton University.
- In 1975 he was awarded an honorary Doctor of Humane Letters from Rhode Island College.
- In 1979 he was awarded an honorary Doctor of Fine Arts from the Rhode Island School of Design.
- In 1977 he won the Vicky Metcalf Award.
- In 1981 he was made an Honorary Fellow, Ontario College of Art.
- In 1987 he was awarded an Honorary Doctor of Law from Dalhousie University.
- In 1997 he was awarded the Massey Medal from the Royal Canadian Geographical Society.

== Selected works ==
=== Books for children ===
- Akavak: An Eskimo Journey, 1968.
- Black Diamonds: A Search for Arctic Treasure, 1982.
- Drifting Snow: An Arctic Search, 1992, winner of the 1993 Governor General's Awards
- Eagle Mask: A West Coast Indian Tale, 1966.
- The Falcon Bow: An Arctic Legend, 1986.
- Fire into Ice: Adventures in Glass Making, 1998.
- Frozen Fire: A Tale of Courage, 1977.
- Ghost Paddle: A Northwest Coast Indian Tale, 1972.
- Ice Swords: An Undersea Adventure, 1985.
- Kiviok's Magic Journey: An Eskimo Legend, 1973.
- Long Claws: An Arctic Adventure, 1981.
- River Runners: A Tale of Hardship and Bravery, 1979, winner of the 1980 Canadian Library Association Book of the Year for Children Award.
- Tikta'liktak: An Eskimo Legend, 1965, winner of the 1966 Canadian Library Association Book of the Year for Children Award.
- The White Archer: An Eskimo Legend, 1967, winner of the 1968 Canadian Library Association Book of the Year for Children Award.
- Whiteout, 1991
- Wolf Run: A Caribou Eskimo Tale, 1971.

=== Books for adults ===
- Confessions of an Igloo Dweller, 1995.
- Eagle Song: An Indian Saga Based on True Events, 1983.
- Eskimo Graphic Art: 1964-1965, 1965.
- Eskimo Handicrafts, 1951.
- Eskimo Prints, 1967.
- Ghost Fox, 1977.
- Hideaway: Life on the Queen Charlotte Islands, 1999.
- The Ice Master: A Novel of the Arctic, 1997.
- Ojibwa Summer, 1972.
- Running West, 1989.
- Songs of the Dream People, 1972.
- Spirit Wrestler, 1980. McClelland and Stewart, ISBN 0-7710-4250-7
- The White Dawn: An Eskimo Saga, 1971.
- Zigzag: A Life on the Move, 1998.
