= List of Indigenous artists of the Americas =

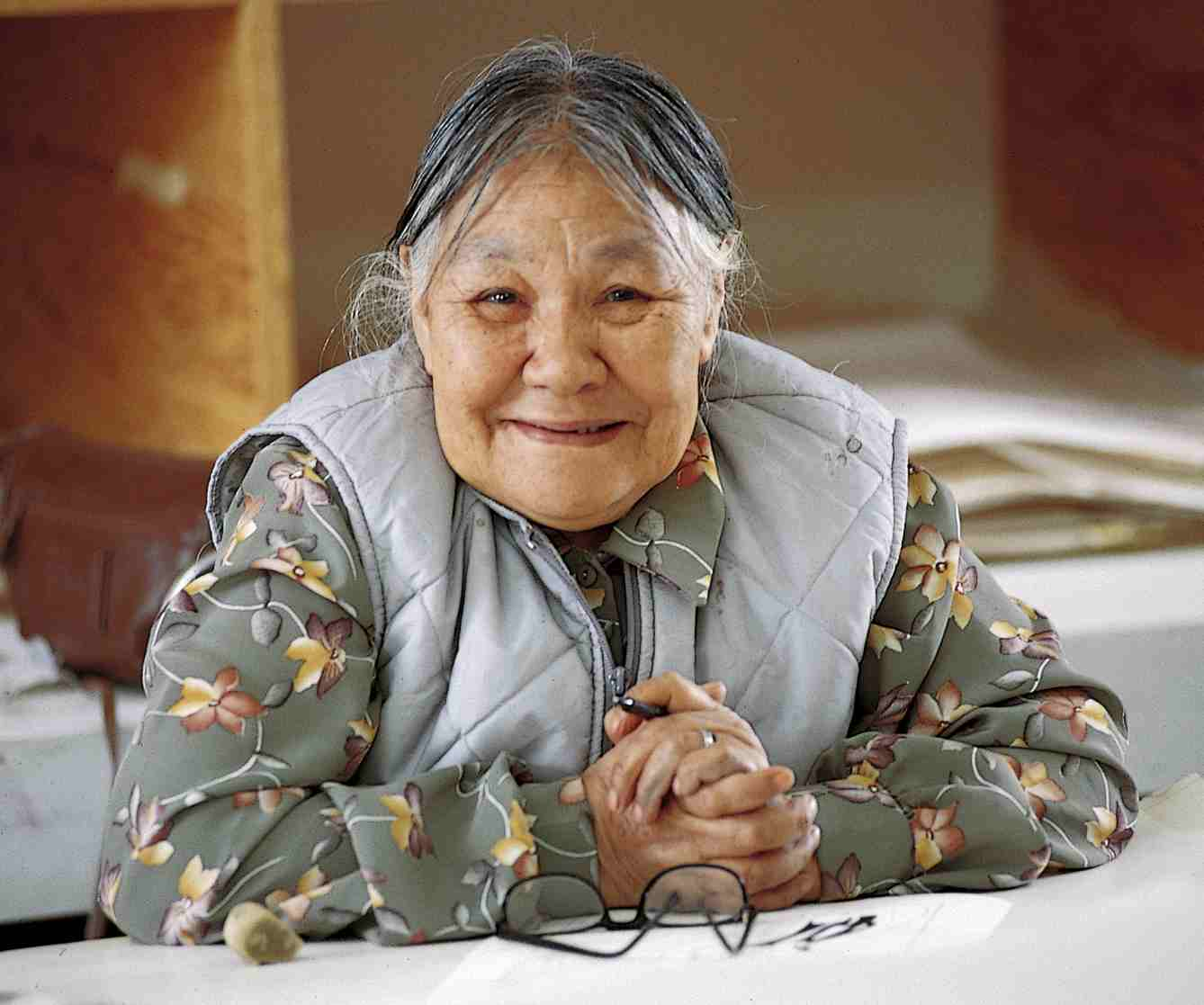
Kenojuak Ashevak, Inuk printmaker

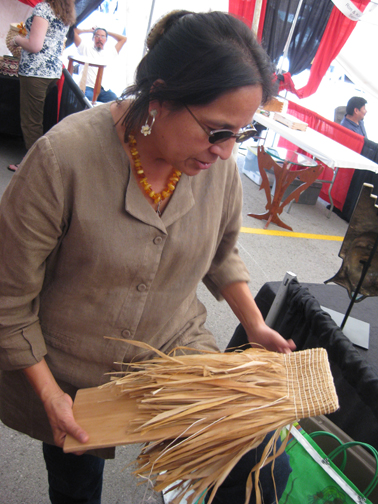
Martha Gradolf, Winnebago weaver

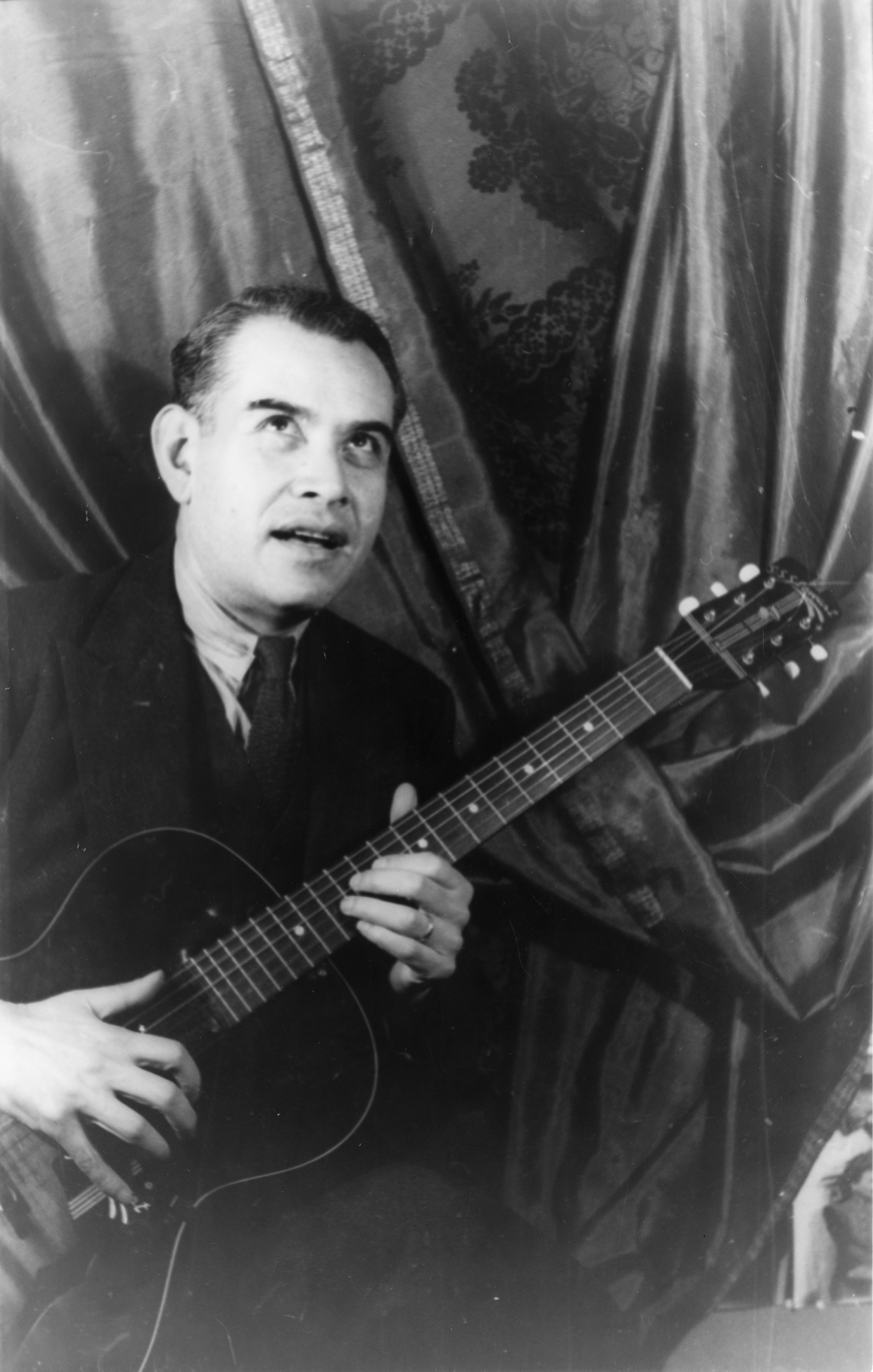
Rufino Tamayo, Zapotec painter

This is a list of visual artists who are Indigenous peoples of the Americas, categorized by primary media. Mestizo and Métis artists whose Indigenous descent is integral to their art are included, as are Siberian Yup'ik artists due to their cultural commonalities with Alaskan Yup'ik people. This list includes notable visual artists who are Inuit, Alaskan Natives, Siberian Yup'ik, American Indians, First Nations, Métis, Mestizos, and Indigenous peoples of Mexico, the Caribbean, Central America, and South America.

Indigenous identity is a complex and contested issue and differs from country to country in the Americas. Inclusion to this list is based on legal membership to an Indigenous community, when applicable, or recognition by the relevant Indigenous community/communities of the individual as a member of that community.

== Basket makers ==
- Elsie Allen, Cloverdale Pomo, 1899–1990
- Annie Antone, Tohono O'odham
- Carrie Bethel, Mono Lake Paiute, 1898–1974
- Mary Holiday Black, Navajo, c. 1934–2022
- Loren Bommelyn, Smith River Tolowa
- Nellie Charlie, Mono Lake Paiute, 1867–1965
- Kelly Church, Potawatomi/Odawa-Ojibwe
- Delores Churchill, Haida
- Mike Dart, Cherokee Nation, born 1977
- Florence Davidson, Haida, Canada, 1896–1993
- Mavis Doering, Cherokee Nation, 1929–2007
- Joe Feddersen, Colville, born 1953
- Jeremy Frey, Penobscot (born 1978)
- Iva Honyestewa, Hopi/Navajo
- Terrol Dew Johnson, Tohono O'odham
- Yvonne Walker Keshick, Anishinaabe born 1946
- Louisa Keyser (Datsolalee), Washoe, c. 1829/1850–1925
- Kikisoblu (Princess Angeline), Lushootseed, c. 1820–1896
- Julia Marden, Aquinnah Wampanoag
- Mabel McKay, Pomo/Patwin, 1907–1993
- Geo Soctomah Neptune, Passamaquoddy
- Essie Parrish, Kashaya Pomo, 1902–1979
- Christine Navarro Paul, Chitimacha, 1874–1946
- Boeda Strand, Snohomish
- Lucy Telles, Mono Lake Paiute/Yosemite Miwok, c. 1885–1955
- Dawn Nichols Walden, Mackinac Bands of Chippewa and Ottawa Indians, born 1949

== Beadwork and quillwork artists ==
- Tahnee Ahtone, Kiowa/Muscogee/Seminole
- Richard Aitson, Kiowa/Plains Apache, 1953–2022
- Marcus Amerman, Choctaw Nation of Oklahoma
- Imogene Goodshot Arquero, beadwork artist
- Martha Berry, Cherokee Nation
- Chipeta, Plains Apache, c. 1843–1924
- Juanita Growing Thunder Fogarty, Fort Peck Assiniboine and Sioux, born 1969
- Teri Greeves, Kiowa, born 1970
- Carla Hemlock, Kahnawà:ke Mohawk
- Rhonda Holy Bear, Cheyenne River Lakota, sculptor, beadworker, dollmaker, born 1959
- Vanessa Paukeigope Jennings, Kiowa/Kiowa Apache/Gila River Pima, born 1952
- Maude Kegg, Mille Lacs Ojibwe, 1904–1986
- Yvonne Walker Keshick, Grand Traverse Ottawa-Ojibwe, born 1946
- Katrina Mitten, Miami Tribe of Oklahoma beadwork artist
- Melissa Peter-Paul, Mi'kmaw quill worker from Abegweit First Nation, Epekwitk/Prince Edward Island
- Emily Waheneka, Warm Springs/Wasco/Northern Paiute, 1919–2008

== Ceramic artists ==
- Aguilar Family, Santo Domingo Pueblo
- Mrs. Ramos Aguilar, Santo Domingo Pueblo
- Tammie Allen, Jicarilla Apache
- Asuncion Aguilar Cate, Santo Domingo Pueblo
- Betty Gaedtke, Quapaw
- Crucita Gonzales Calabaza (Blue Corn), San Ildefonso Pueblo
- Marie Chino, Acoma
- Vera Chino, Acoma
- Deborah Clashin, Hopi-Tewa, born 1928
- Helen Quintana Cordero, Cochiti Pueblo, 1915–1994
- Arthur and Hilda Coriz, Santo Domingo Pueblo
- Juanita Suazo Dubray, Taos Pueblo
- Anthony Durand, Picuris Pueblo
- Felipita Aguilar Garcia, Santo Domingo Pueblo
- Tammy Garcia, Santa Clara Pueblo, born 1969
- Bill Glass Jr., Cherokee Nation
- Rose Gonzales, Ohkay Owingeh
- Margaret and Luther Gutierrez, Santa Clara Pueblo
- Michael Kanteena, Laguna Pueblo
- Lucy M. Lewis, Acoma Pueblo
- Joseph Lonewolf, Santa Clara Pueblo
- Julian Martinez, San Ildefonso Pueblo
- Maria Montoya Martinez (Poveka), San Ildefonso Pueblo
- Helen Naha, Hopi
- Tyra Naha, Hopi, granddaughter of Helen Naha
- Nampeyo, Hopi-Tewa, c. 1859–1942
- Elva Nampeyo, Hopi
- Fannie Nampeyo, Hopi
- Dextra Nampeyo Quotskuyva, Hopi-Tewa
- Nora Naranjo-Morse, Santa Clara Pueblo
- Dominga Neculmán, Mapuche
- Garnet Pavatea, Hopi-Tewa, 1915–1981
- Al Qöyawayma, Hopi
- Jeri Redcorn, Caddo/Potawatomi, born c. 1940
- Diego Romero, Cochiti Pueblo
- Linda Sisneros, Santa Clara Pueblo
- Merton Sisneros, Santa Clara Pueblo
- Anita Suazo, Santa Clara Pueblo
- Roxanne Swentzell, Santa Clara Pueblo
- Margaret Tafoya, Santa Clara Pueblo, 1904–2001
- Leonidas Tapia, Ohkay Owingeh
- Faye Tso, Navajo, 1933–2004
- Nathan Youngblood, Santa Clara Pueblo

== Diverse cultural artists ==
- David Moses Bridges (Passamaquoddy, 1962–2017), birchbark artist, canoe maker
- William Commanda, Anishinaabe, Canada, born 1913, canoe maker
- Nora Thompson Dean (Touching Leaves Woman), Delaware Tribe of Indians, 1907–1984
- Ishi, Yahi (ca. 1860-1916), bowmaker and flintknapper
- Vanessa Paukeigope Jennings, Kiowa/Apache/Pima, born 1952
- Tomah Joseph (Passamaquoddy, 1837–1914), birchbark artist, canoe maker
- Charles Littleleaf, Blackfoot/Warm Springs, flute maker
- Tom Mauchahty-Ware, Kiowa/Comanche, 1946–2015, flute maker
- Angelique Merasty, Woodland Cree, 1924–1996, birchbark biter
- Scarface Charley, Modoc, c. 1851–1896
- Hastings Shade, Cherokee Nation, 1941–2010, antler carver, marble- and gig-maker
- Tommy Wildcat, Cherokee Nation/Natchez, flute and rattle maker, born 1967

== Draftspeople ==
Artists who primarily work in drawing, including pastels.

- Kenojuak Ashevak, Inuk, born 1927
- Pitseolak Ashoona, Inuk, 1904/1907–1983
- Roy Boney, Jr., Cherokee Nation, born 1978
- Chafil Cheucarama, Wounaan, Panama
- Felipe Guaman Poma de Ayala, Quechua, c. 1535–after 1616
- Aka Høegh, Greenlandic Inuk, born 1947
- Tivi Etok, Inuk, born 1929
- Alootook Ipellie, Inuk, 1951–2007
- Helen Kalvak, Copper Inuit, 1901–1983
- Siassie Kenneally, Inuk, 1969–2018
- Daphne Odjig, Odawa-Potawatomi, born 1919
- Ulayu Pingwartok, Inuk, 1904–1978
- Tim Pitsiulak, Inuk, 1967–2016
- Annie Pootoogook, Inuk, born 1969
- Napachie Pootoogook, Inuk, 1938–2002
- Mary Pudlat, Inuk, 1923–2001
- Pudlo Pudlat, Inuk, 1916–1992
- Moses Stranger Horse, Brulé Lakota, 1890–1941
- Pablo Tac, Luiseño, 1822–1841
- Irene Avaalaaqiaq Tiktaalaaq, Inuk, born 1941
- Francisco Toledo, Zapotec, Mexico, born 1940
- Kakulu Saggiaktok, Inuk, 1940–2020
- Nicotye Samayualie, Inuk, born 1983
- Shanawdithit, Beothuk, Canada, c. 1801–1829
- Angotigolu Teevee, Inuk, 1910–1967
- Ningiukulu Teevee, Inuk, born 1963
- Simon Tookoome, Inuk, 1934–2010
- Elizabeth Woody, Navajo-Tenino (Warm Springs)-Wasco-Yakama, born 1959
- Michael Nicoll Yahgulanaas, Haida, Canada, born 1954

== Glass artists ==
- Marcus Amerman, Choctaw, born 1959
- Joe Feddersen, Colville, born 1953
- Marianne Nicolson, PhD, Dzawada’enuxw, born 1969
- Preston Singletary, Tlingit, born 1963

== Installation artists ==
- Natalie Ball, Klamath/Modoc, born 1980
- Rebecca Belmore, Ojibway, Canada, born 1960
- Raven Chacon, Navajo Nation, born 1977
- Corky Clairmont, Salish-Kootenai, born 1946
- Gerald Clarke, Cahuilla, born 1967
- Lorenzo Clayton, Navajo, born 1950
- Bonnie Devine, Serpent River First Nation
- Greg A. Hill, Kanyen'kehaka Mohawk, Canada
- Brian Jungen, Danezaa, Canada, born 1970
- Truman Lowe, Ho-Chunk, 1940–2019
- Cannupa Hanska Luger, Mandan/Hidatsa/Arikara/Lakota, born 1979
- James Luna, Luiseño, 1950–2018
- Nora Naranjo Morse, Santa Clara Pueblo, born 1953
- Marianne Nicolson, Dzawada’enuxw, Canada, born 1969
- Charlene Teters, Spokane, born 1952
- Marie Watt, Seneca Nation, born 1967
- Richard Ray Whitman, Yuchi/Muscogee, born 1949
- Holly Wilson (Delaware Nation/Cherokee, born 1968)

== Metalsmiths and jewelers ==
- Atsidi Sani, "Old Smith", Navajo, c. 1828–1918
- Klee Benally, Navajo, born October 1975
- Gail Bird, Kewa Pueblo-Laguna Pueblo
- Gomeo Bobelu, Zuni, 1964–2022
- Ben Nighthorse Campbell, Cheyenne, born 1933
- Charles Edenshaw, Haida, Canada, 1839–1920
- Michael Horse, Yaqui-Mescalero Apache-Zuni-descent, born 1951
- Yazzie Johnson, Navajo
- Michael Kabotie, Hopi, 1942–2009
- Charles Loloma, Hopi, 1921–1991
- Bill Reid, Haida, Canada, 1920–1998
- Emory Sekaquaptewa, Hopi, 1928–2007
- Phillip Sekaquaptewa, Hopi, born 1956
- Sequoyah, Cherokee, c. 1767–1843
- Jay Simeon, Haida, Canada, born 1976
- Tommy Singer, Navajo, born 1940
- Orville Tsinnie, Diné, 1943–2017

== New media artists ==
- Natalie Ball, Klamath/Modoc, born 1980
- Nicholas Galanin, Tlingit/Unangax̂, born 1979
- Rosemary Georgeson, Coast Salish/Sahtu multimedia artist
- Skawennati, Mohawk multimedia and digital artist

== Mixed-media artists ==
- Melissa Melero-Moose (Northern Paiute/Modoc), mixed-media artist, curator
- Brian D. Tripp (Karuk Tribe, 1945–2022)

== Painters ==
=== Canada and Greenland ===
- Aron of Kangeq, Kalaallit, Greenland, 1822–1869
- Carl Beam, M'Chigeeng First Nation Ojibwe 1943–2005
- Jackson Beardy, Ayisini, 1944–1984
- Robert Boyer, Métis-Cree, 1948–2004
- Benjamin Chee Chee, Ojibwe, 1944–1977
- Thue Christiansen, Greenlandic Inuk, Greenland, born 1940
- George Clutesi, Tseshaht First Nation, 1905–1988
- Eddy Cobiness, Ojibwe, 1933–1996
- Joseph Tehawehron David, Mohawk, 1957–2004
- Delree Dumont, Onion Lake Cree Nation
- Robert Houle, Saulteaux, born 1947
- Tom Hogan, Ojibwe, 1955–2014
- Alex Janvier, Dene Suline-Saulteaux, born 1935
- Abe Kakepetum, Sandy Lake First Nation
- Henrik Lund, Greenlandic Inuk, Greenland, 1875–1948
- Gerald McMaster, Plains Cree-Siksika First Nation, born 1953
- Kent Monkman, Cree, born 1965
- Norval Morrisseau, Ojibwa, 1932–2007
- David Neel, Kwakwaka'wakw, born 1960
- Maxine Noel, Santee-Oglala Lakota, born 1946
- Daphne Odjig, Odawa/Potawatomi, born 1919
- Carl Ray, Sandy Lake First Nation, 1943–1978
- Rick Rivet, Sahtu/Métis, born 1949
- Allen Sapp, Cree, 1928–2015
- Alan Syliboy, Millbrook Mi'kmaw (born 1952) painter, mixed-media artist
- David B. Williams, Ojibway, died 2009
- Alfred Young Man, Plains Cree

=== United States ===
- Arthur Amiotte, Oglala Lakota (born 1942)
- Spencer Asah, Kiowa, one of the Kiowa Six (c. 1905–1954)
- James Auchiah, Kiowa, one of the Kiowa Six (1906–1974)
- Alexandra Backford, Aleut (1942–2010)
- Amos Bad Heart Bull, Oglala Lakota (1869–1913)
- Louis Ballard (Honga-no-zhe), Quapaw/Cherokee
- Rick Bartow, Mad River Wiyot (born 1946)
- Fred Beaver (Eka La Nee), Muscogee Creek/Seminole (1911–1980)
- Harrison Begay (Haskay Yahne Yah), Navajo (1914–2012)
- Archie Blackowl (Mistamootova), Southern Cheyenne (1911–1992)
- Acee Blue Eagle (Alexander C. McIntosh), Muscogee Creek (ca. 1909–1959)
- Gibson Byrd, Shawnee Tribe, (1923–2002)
- T.C. Cannon (Pai-doung-u-day), Kiowa/Caddo (1946–1978)
- Pop Chalee (Merina Lujan), Taos Pueblo (1908–1993)
- Adele Collins, Chickasaw painter (1908–1996)
- Jesse Cornplanter, Seneca Nation (1889–1957)
- Woody Crumbo, Citizen Potawatomi (1912–1989)
- David Cusick, Tuscarora (c. 1786–1831)
- Dennis Cusick, Tuscarora (c. 1800–1824)
- Talmadge Davis, Cherokee Nation (1962–2005)
- Gregg Deal, Pyramid Lake Paiute Tribe (born 1975)
- Angel De Cora (Hinook-Mahiwi-Kilinaka), Winnebago (1871–1919)
- Patrick DesJarlait, Red Lake Ojibwe (1923–1973)
- Cecil Dick, Cherokee Nation (1915–1992)
- Bunky Echo–Hawk, Yakama/Pawnee (born 1975)
- Joseph Erb, Cherokee Nation (born 1974)
- Harry Fonseca, Maidu (1946–2006)
- Jeffrey Gibson, Mississippi Choctaw/Cherokee (born 1972)
- R.C. Gorman, Navajo (1932–2005)
- Enoch Kelly Haney, Seminole/Muscogee (born 1940)
- Helen Hardin (Tsa-Sah-Wee-Eh), Santa Clara Pueblo (1943–1984)
- Albert Harjo, Muscogee Creek (1937–2019)
- Benjamin Harjo, Jr., Absentee Shawnee/Seminole (1945–2023)
- Sharron Ahtone Harjo, Kiowa (born 1945)
- Hachivi Edgar Heap of Birds, Southern Cheyenne (born 1954)
- Sarah Ortegon HighWalking, Eastern Shoshone and Northern Arapaho
- Joan Hill, Muscogee (Creek) Nation/Cherokee (1930–2020)
- Jack Hokeah, Kiowa, one of the Kiowa Six (1902–1969)
- Norma Howard, Choctaw Nation/Mississippi Choctaw/Chickasaw
- Oscar Howe (Mazuha Hokshina), Yanktonai (1915–1983)
- Howling Wolf, Southern Cheyenne (1849–1927)
- Sharon Irla, Cherokee Nation (born 1957)
- David Johns (Navajo Nation) (born 1948)
- Ruthe Blalock Jones (Shawnee/Peoria) (born 1939)
- Fred Kabotie (Naqavoy'ma), Hopi (1900–1986)
- Michael Kabotie, Hopi
- Lois Smoky Kaulaity, Bougetah, Kiowa, one of the Kiowa Six (1907–1981)
- Albert Looking Elk, Taos Pueblo (c. 1888–1940)
- Albert Lujan, Taos Pueblo (1892–1948)
- Julian Martinez, San Ildefonso Pueblo (1897–1943)
- Mario Martinez, Yaqui (born 1953)
- Barbara McAlister, Cherokee Nation (born 1941)
- Alex Meraz, Purépecha (born 1985)
- America Meredith, Cherokee Nation (born 1972)
- Douglas Miles, San Carlos Apache/Akimel O'odham (born c. 1962)
- Juan Mirabal, Taos Pueblo (1903–1970)
- Stephen Mopope (Qued Koi), Kiowa, one of the Kiowa Six (1898–1974)
- George Morrison, Grand Portage Ojibwe (1919–2000)
- Naiche, Chiricahua Apache (c. 1857–1919)
- Gerald Nailor, Sr. (Toh Yah), Navajo (1917–1952)
- Dan Namingha, Hopi
- Jackson Narcomey, Muscogee Creek Nation/Seminole (1942–2012)
- Doc Tate Nevaquaya (Comanche Nation) (1932–1996)
- Lloyd Kiva New (Cherokee Nation) (1916–2002)
- Diane O'Leary, Comanche (1939–2013)
- Tonita Peña, San Ildefonso (1893–1949)
- St. David Pendleton Oakerhater (Making Medicine), Southern Cheyenne (c. 1847–1931)
- Otis Polelonema (Lomadamocvia), Hopi (1902–1981)
- Sanford Plummer (Ga-yo-gwa-doke), Seneca Nation (1905–1974)
- Harvey Pratt, Cheyenne-Arapaho Tribes (1941–2025)
- Kevin Red Star, Crow Nation
- Mateo Romero, Cochiti Pueblo (born 1966)
- Paladine Roye, Ponca (1946–2001)
- Will Sampson, Muscogee Creek (1933–1977)
- Fritz Scholder, Luiseño (1933–2005)
- Ernest Smith, Seneca Nation (1907–1975)
- Jaune Quick-To-See Smith, Salish-Kootenai/Métis/Shoshone-Bannock
- Ernest Spybuck, Absentee Shawnee (1883–1949)
- Moses Stranger Horse, Sicangu Lakota (1890–1941)
- Virginia Stroud, United Keetoowah Band Cherokee/Muscogee (born 1951)
- Carl Sweezy, Southern Arapaho (1881–1953)
- Quincy Tahoma, Navajo (1920–1956)
- Jerome Tiger, Muscogee Creek/Seminole (1941–1967)
- Johnny Tiger Jr., Muscogee Creek/Seminole (1940–2015)
- Brian D. Tripp (Karuk Tribe, 1945–2022)
- Tohausen, Kiowa (c. 1785–1866)
- Monroe Tsatoke, Kiowa, one of the Kiowa Six (1904–1937)
- Klah Tso, Navajo (mid-19th–early 20th century)
- Pablita Velarde (Tse Tsan), Santa Clara Pueblo (1918–2006)
- Kay WalkingStick, Cherokee Nation
- Walter Richard West Sr., Dick West, Southern Cheyenne (1912–1996)
- Dyani White Hawk, Sicangu Lakota (born 1976)
- White Horse, Kiowa (died 1892)
- Emmi Whitehorse, Navajo

=== Mexico ===
- Fernando de Alva Cortés Ixtlilxochitl, Texcocan, (1568/1580–1648)
- Miguel Cabrera, Zapotec, (1695–1768)
- Jesús Guerrero Galván, Nahua, (1910–1973)
- Frida Kahlo, Purépecha-descent, (1907–1954)
- Rodolfo Morales, Zapotec, (1925–2001)
- Diego Rivera, Mestizo from mother's side, (1886–1957)
- Rufino Tamayo, Zapotec, (1899–1991)

=== Central America and the Caribbean ===
- Pen Cayetano, Garifuna, Belize
- Chafil Cheucarama, Wounaan, Panama
- Andrés Curruchich, Kaqchikel Maya, (1891–1969)
- Rosa Elena Curruchich, Maya Kaqchikel, (1958–2005)
- Luis Rolando Ixquiac Xicara, Maya, Guatemala, (born 1947)
- Aníbal López, Maya, Guatemala, (born 1964)
- Carlos Mérida, K'iche' Maya-Zapotec, Guatemala, (1891–1984)

=== South America ===
- Camilo Egas, Mestizo, Ecuador, (1889–1962)
- Oswaldo Guayasamín, Quechua, Ecuador, (1919–1999)
- Antonio Sinchi Roca Inka, Quechua, Peru, (17th century)
- Eduardo Kingman, Mestizo, Ecuador, (1913–1998)
- Carlos Jacanamijoy, Inga, Colombia, (born 1964)
- Roberto Mamani Mamani, Aymara, Bolivia, (born 1962)
- Diego Quispe Tito, Quechua, Peru, (1611–1681)
- Basilio Santa Cruz Pumacallao, Quechua, Peru, (17th century)
- George Simon, Lokono Arawak, Guyana, (born 1947)
- Alejandro Mario Yllanes, Aymara, Bolivia, (1913–1960)
- Marcos Zapata, Quechua, Peru, (c. 1710–1773)

== Performance artists ==
- Natalie Ball, Klamath/Modoc, (born 1980)
- Marcus Amerman, Choctaw, (born 1959)
- Rebecca Belmore, Anishinaabe, Canada, (born 1960)
- Gregg Deal, Pyramid Lake Paiute Tribe, (born 1975)
- Aníbal López, Maya, Guatemala, (born 1964)
- James Luna, Luiseño, (born 1950)
- Kent Monkman, Cree, Canada, (born 1965)
- Mujeres Creando, Mestiza, Bolivia

== Photographers ==
- Dugan Aguilar, Paiute-Achomawi-Maidu (1947–2018)
- Martín Chambi, Quechua, Peru (1891–1973)
- Jennie Ross Cobb, Cherokee (1881–1959)
- Jeremy Dennis, Shinnecock (born 1990)
- Jean Fredericks, Hopi (1906–1990)
- Luis González Palma, Mestizo, Guatemala (born 1957)
- Shan Goshorn, Eastern Band Cherokee (1957–2018)
- Benjamin Haldane, Tsimshian (1874–1941)
- Sally Larsen, Apache-Alutiiq
- L. Frank Manriquez, Tongva-Acjachemen
- Lee Marmon, Laguna Pueblo (1925–2021)
- Parker McKenzie, Kiowa (1897–1999)
- Larry McNeil, Tlingit-Nisga'a (born 1955)
- David Neel, Kwakwaka'wakw (born 1960)
- Shelley Niro, Mohawk (born 1954)
- Peter Pitseolak, Inuk (1902–1973)
- Horace Poolaw, Kiowa (1906–1984)
- Arthur Renwick, Haisla (born 1965)
- Richard Throssel, Cree (1882–1933)
- Hulleah Tsinhnahjinnie, Muscogee Creek-Seminole-Navajo (born 1954)
- Richard Ray Whitman, Yuchi-Muscogee Creek (born 1949)
- Matika Wilbur, founder of Project 562, Swinomish-Tulalip (born 1984)
- Will Wilson, Navajo (born 1969)

== Printmakers ==
- Germaine Arnaktauyok, Inuk, (born 1946)
- Kenojuak Ashevak, Inuk, (born 1927)
- Siasi Atitu, Inuk, (c.1896–1983)
- T.C. Cannon (Pai-doung-u-day), Kiowa-Caddo-Choctaw
- Corky Clairmont, Salish-Kootenai, (born 1946)
- Santos Chávez, Mapuche, Chile, (1934–2001)
- Lorenzo Clayton, Navajo, (born 1950)
- Joe David, Nuu-chah-nulth, (born 1946)
- Tivi Etok, Inuk, (born 1929)
- Joe Feddersen, Colville, (born 1953)
- R.C. Gorman, Navajo, (1932–2005)
- Benjamin Harjo Jr., Shawnee-Seminole
- Hachivi Edgar Heap of Birds, Cheyenne-Arapaho
- Debora Iyall, Cowlitz, (born 1954)
- Kiakshuk, Inuk, (1886–1966)
- Iyola Kingwatsiak, Inuk, (1933–2000)
- Terran Last Gun, Piikani Blackfoot, (born 1989)
- James Lavadour, Walla Walla
- Linda Lomahaftewa, Hopi-Choctaw, (born 1947)
- Kavavaow Mannomee, Inuk, (born 1958)
- America Meredith, Cherokee Nation, (born 1972)
- Carlos Mérida, K'iche' Maya, (1891–1984)
- Ohotaq Mikkigak, Inuk, (1936–2014)
- Kellypalik Mungitok, Inuk, (born 1940)
- Natsivaar, Inuk, (1919–1962)
- Jessie Oonark, Inuk, (1906–1985)
- Josie Pamiutu Papialuk, Inuk, (1918–1996)
- Parr, Inuk, (1893–1969)
- Sheouak Petaulassie, Inuk, (1918 or 1923–1961)
- David Ruben Piqtoukun, Inuk, (born 1950)
- Eegyvudluk Pootoogook, Inuk, (1931–2000)
- Sharni Pootoogook, Inuk, (1922–2003)
- Kananginak Pootoogook, Inuk, (born 1935)
- Jay Simeon, Haida, Canada, (born 1976)
- Jaune Quick-To-See Smith, Salish-Kootenai, Métis-Cree, Shoshone-Bannock
- Joe Talirunili, Inuk, Canada, (c. 1893–1976)
- Angotigolu Teevee, Inuk, (1910–1967)
- Jamasie Teevee, Inuk, (1910–1985)
- Ikayukta Tunnillie, Inuk, (1911–1980)
- Arthur Vickers, Tsimshian-Heiltsuk, Canada, (born 1947)
- Roy Henry Vickers, Tsimshian-Haida-Heiltsuk, (born 1946)
- Tania Willard, Secwepemc nation
- Nathaniel P. Wilkerson, Gitxsan, (born 1972)
- Melanie Yazzie, Navajo, (born 1966)
- Alejandro Mario Yllanes, Aymara, Bolivia, (1913–1960)

== Sculptors ==
Artists primarily working in antler, bone, metal, stone, and other materials, except wood. Sculptors working primarily in wood are listed below.

- Latcholassie Akesuk, Inuk (1919–2000)
- Isa Paddy Aqiattusuk, Inuk (1898–1954)
- Kiugak Ashoona, Inuk (1933–2014)
- Blackbear Bosin, Kiowa/Comanche (1921–1980)
- Thue Christiansen Greenlandic Inuk, (born 1940)
- Gerald Clarke, Cahuilla Band of Indians (born 1967)
- Lorenzo Clayton, Navajo (born 1950)
- Ennutsiak, Inuk (1896–1967)
- Lucassie Etungat, Inuk, (1951–?)
- Joe Feddersen, Colville Okanagan/Sinixt (born 1953)
- Cliff Fragua, Jemez Pueblo
- Tammy Garcia, Santa Clara Pueblo (born 1969)
- Jeffrey Gibson, Mississippi Choctaw/Cherokee (born 1972)
- Aka Høegh, Greenlandic Inuk (born 1947)
- Allan Houser (Haozous), Chiricahua Apache (1914–1994)
- Bob Haozous, Fort Sill Warm Springs Chiricahua Apache (born 1943)
- Iola Abraham Ikkidluak, Inuk, (1936–2003)
- Tivi Ilisituk, Inuk, (born 1933)
- Charlie Inukpuk, Inuk, (born 1941)
- Osuitok Ipeelee, Inuk, (1922–2005)
- Davidee Itulu, Inuk, (1929–2006)
- Kiakshuk, Inuk, (1886–1966)
- Davidee Kavik, Inuk, (born 1915)
- Floyd Kuptana, Inuk, (born 1964)
- Truman Lowe, Ho-chunk (1940–2019)
- Edmonia Lewis, Mississauga Ojibwe, (c. 1844–1907)
- Enook Manomie, Inuk, (1941–2006)
- Andy Miki, Inuk, (1918–1983)
- Nora Naranjo Morse, Santa Clara Pueblo (born 1953)
- Adamie Niviaxie, Inuk, (born 1925)
- Maudie Rachel Okittuq, Inuk, (born 1944)
- John Pangnark, Inuk, (1920–1980)
- David Ruben Piqtoukun, Inuk, (1950–2026)
- Harvey Pratt, Cheyenne-Arapaho Tribes (1941–2025)
- Lawney Reyes, Sinixt
- Pauta Saila, Inuk, (c. 1916–2009)
- Ronald Senungetuk, Iñupiaq, (1933–2020)
- Aqjangajuk Shaa, Inuk, (1937–2019)
- Nick Sikkuark, Inuk, (1943–2013)
- Charlie Sivuarapik, Inuk, (1911–1968)
- Russell Spears, Narragansett (1917–2009)
- Roxanne Swentzell, Santa Clara Pueblo (born 1962)
- Ralph W. Sturges, Mohegan (1918–2007)
- Joe Talirunili, Inuk, Canada, (c. 1893–1976)
- Nalenik Temela, Inuk, (1939–2003)
- John Tiktak, Inuk, (1916–1981)
- Mary Tassugat, Inuk, (1918-2016)
- Bernadette Iguptark Tongelik, Inuk, (1931–1980)
- Simon Tookoome, Utkusiksalingmiut Inuk, (1934–2010)
- Brian D. Tripp (Karuk Tribe, 1945–2022)
- Mark Tungilik, Inuk, (unknown–1986)
- Natar Ungalaaq, Inuk, (born 1959)
- Marie Watt, Seneca Nation (born 1967)
- Holly Wilson, Delaware Nation/Delaware Tribe of Indians, (born 1968)

== Textile artists ==
- Malaya Akulukjuk, Inuk (1915–1995)
- Natalie Ball, Klamath/Modoc (born 1980)
- D.Y. Begay, Navajo (born 1953)
- Florence Davidson, Haida, Canada (1896–1993)
- Sarah Hardisty, Dene regalia maker, textile artist, and quillwork artist (1924–2014)
- Hastiin Klah, Navajo (1867–1937)
- Lily Hope, Tlingit (born 1983)
- Ursala Hudson, Tlingit
- Carla Hemlock, Mohawk (born 1961)
- Julia Marden, Aquinnah Wampanoag
- Arnulfo Mendoza, Zapotec (1954–2014)
- Patricia Michaels, Taos Pueblo
- Ardina Moore, Quapaw/Osage (1930–2022)
- Dora Old Elk, Apsáalooke/Sioux (born 1977)
- Jessie Oonark, Inuk (1906–1985)
- Eric-Paul Riege, Navajo (born 1994)
- Clarissa Rizal, Tlingit (1956–2016)
- Marilou Schultz, Navajo (born 1954)
- Clara Sherman (Nezbah), Navajo (born 1911)
- Debra Sparrow, Musqueam weaver and jeweler
- Jennie Thlunaut, Tlingit (1892–1986)

== Woodcarvers ==
- Frederick Alexcee, Tsimshian, (1853–1940s)
- Dempsey Bob, Tahltan-Tlingit, (born 1948)
- Dale Campbell, Tahltan, (born 1954)
- Jesse Cornplanter, Seneca Nation, (1889–1957)
- Amanda Crowe, Eastern Band Cherokee, (1928–2004)
- Reg Davidson, Haida, (born 1954)
- Robert Davidson, Haida, (born 1946)
- Freda Diesing, Haida, (1925–2002)
- Charles Edenshaw, Haida, (c. 1839–1920)
- Walter Harris, Gitksan, (born 1931)
- Bill Helin, Tsimshian
- Babe Hemlock, Mohawk, (born 1961)
- Calvin Hunt, Kwakwaka'wakw, (born 1956)
- Henry Hunt, Kwakwaka'wakw, (born 1923)
- Richard Hunt, Kwakwaka'wakw, (born 1951)
- Tony Hunt, Kwakwaka'wakw, (born 1942)
- Oswald Hussein, Lokono Arawak, (born 1946)
- William Jeffrey, Tsimshian, (1899–?)
- Gerry Marks, Haida
- Mungo Martin, Kwakwaka'wakw, (1879–1962)
- Tom Mauchahty-Ware, Kiowa-Comanche
- Ellen Neel, Kwakwaka'wakw, (1916–1966)
- Bill Reid, Haida, (1920–1998)
- Norman Tait, Nisga'a, (born 1941)
- Willie Seaweed, Kwakwaka'wakw
- Terry Starr, Tsimshian, Canada, (born 1951)
- Nathaniel P. Wilkerson, Gitksan, (born 1972)
- James Schoppert, Tlingit, (1947–1992)
- Bernie Williams, Haida

== See also ==
- Native American art
- Timeline of Native American art history
- List of Greenlandic artists
- List of Latin American artists
- List of Native American artists
- List of Native American artists from Oklahoma
- List of writers from peoples indigenous to the Americas
- Native American women in the arts
- Notable Aboriginal people of Canada
- Institute of American Indian Arts
