= Irene Kataq Angutitok =

Inuk artist

- Born: Irene Kataq; 1914; Nunavut, Canada
- Died: 1971 (aged 56–57); Naujaat, Canada
- Known for: Sculptor
- Spouse: Athanasie Angutitaq (m. 1929)

Irene Kataq Angutitok (1914 – 1971) was an Inuk sculptor. Her name also appears as Katak Angutitaq.

== Background ==
She was born in Bathurst Inlet, Nunavut. She married Athanasie Angutitaq in 1929; the couple lived in Naujaat. Their daughter Bernadette Iguptark Tongelik (b.1931) was also a notable artist.

Kataq died in Naujaat in 1971.

== Work ==
Angutitok used soapstone, ivory and whalebone in her art. Some of her sculptures portray scenes from the Bible; encouraged by Father Bernie Franzen. She also created sculptures of female figures.

In 2002, Canada Post created a Christmas stamp based on her sculpture Mary and Child.

== Collections ==
Her works are included in the collections of the National Gallery of Canada, the Metropolitan Museum of Art and the Winnipeg Art Gallery, among other institutions.

== List of Exhibitions ==
- Spoken in Stone: an exhibition of Inuit Art (Whyte Museum of the Canadian Rockies)
- The Bessie Busman Collection (Winnipeg Art Gallery)
- Repulse Bay (Winnipeg Art Gallery)
- The Swinton Collection of Inuit Art (Winnipeg Art Gallery)
- Sculpture/Inuit: Masterworks of the Canadian Arctic (Canadian Eskimo Arts Council and Vancouver Art Gallery)
- The Jacqui and Morris Shumiatcher Collection of Inuit Art (Norman Mackenzie Art Gallery, University of Regina)
- The Abbott Collection of Inuit Art (Winnipeg Art Gallery)
- Eskimo Sculpture (Winnipeg Art Gallery presented at the Manitoba Legislative Building)
- Uumajut: Animal Imagery in Inuit Art (Winnipeg Art Gallery)
- Images of the Far North (Studio Art Gallery, State University of New York)
