= Sarah Ortegon HighWalking =

Eastern Shoshone and Northern Arapaho artist

- Born: Sarah Ortegon; Denver, Colorado
- Education: Metropolitan State University, BFA
- Style: jingle dress dance, beadwork, painting, photography, mixed media,
- Awards: Miss Native American USA (2013)
- Website: sarahortegon.com

Sarah Ortegon HighWalking is a Native American visual artist, dancer, and actor. She is an enrolled citizen of the Eastern Shoshone Tribe of the Wind River Reservation and a Northern Arapaho descendant.

Her work has been presented at the Denver Art Museum, and she danced at the opening of Jeffrey Gibson's installation at the 60th Venice Biennale, in which she was also the subject of video art by Gibson.

== Early life and education ==
Ortegon Highwalking was born in Denver, one of 12 children. As a child, she spent summers on the Wind River Reservation in Wyoming. She began attending powwows at age three, and learned jingle dress dance through observation.

Ortegon graduated from Metropolitan State University of Denver in 2013 with a bachelor's degree in fine art. After graduating from university, she attended the National Outdoor Leadership School which enabled her to travel to Alaska. There she hiked, for several months off-trail in the Chugack Mountains and also sea kayaked. She later became an expedition leader for the school.

== Career ==
As of November 2023, Ortegon HighWalking works as assistant director of Human Resources at the Denver-based Native American Rights Fund.

=== Visual art ===
She primarily creates beadwork on hide and painted in acrylic. She performed at the opening of Jeffrey Gibson's exhibition at the Venice Biennale. Her work has been exhibited at the National Museum of Women in the Arts and the Denver Art Museum, among other venues. According to the Denver Art Museum, her work "embraces the resilience of Indigenous people and acknowledges the ways in which they exist in the modern world."

Ortegon HighWalking began making art in elementary school, and learned beadwork around age nine or ten from her mother. When Ortegon HighWalking first began making art as an adult, she used a mixture of graphite and turpentine, using a pencil to create her works. She later switched to traditional paints, as her early works had a tendency to fade due to the medium. She also adds beadwork to some of her paintings, creating a three-dimensional effect. The landscape of Wyoming is a long-term influence in her works.

One of Ortegon HighWalking's early projects focused on creating paired paintings, one of which would depict a Native American woman and the other of which depicted where the subject lived.

She painted a mural in Denver's River North Art District depicting Mount Blue Sky (at the time Mount Evans), with "Evans" crossed out and replaced with "Blue Sky".

=== Dance ===
Ortegon HighWalking performs in a jingle dress, an experience she says "feels like there’s an inner spirit that is dancing with the regalia". The jingle dress traditions originated with the Anishinaabe people; she learned this type of dancing from other dancers at powwows since she was a child. She has also performed the jingle dance at Lincoln Center in New York City and most recently at the Venice Biennale.

=== Acting ===
As an actor she had roles in the television series 1883 and Jamestown, and has performed in the play Black Elk Speaks.

== Honors ==
In 2013, Ortegon HighWalking was named Miss Native American USA. Following this, she began a career in acting. This allowed her to engage in a cultural exchange with Guatemala and Moldova, where she danced.

In 2024, the National Museum of Women in the Arts announced her as a "Wyoming Woman Artist to Watch", and she was selected as a "Global Woman to Watch."

== Collections and exhibitions ==
Ortegon HighWalking's beadwork on hide, Home Is Where the Heart Is, is held in the permanent collection of the Denver Art Museum.

Ortegon HighWalking was chosen as the Wyoming representative for the National Museum of Women in the Arts(NMWA)'s 2024 Women to Watch exhibit. She contributed a beaded cradleboard which she had made for her son, a video of her dancing jingle dress dance, and four paintings of her jingle dresses, each representing one of the seasons.

A video of Ortegon HighWalking dancing jingle dress was included in Jeffrey Gibson's exhibit "the space in which to place me" at the United States pavilion at the 2024 Venice Biennale.

In July 2024, Ortegon HighWalking was included in the exhibition Elemental Landscapes at History Jackson Hole in Jackson Hole, Wyoming.

== Personal life ==
She is married to Jason HighWalking. Their son, Aenohe, was born in 2023.
