= Natsivaar =

Inuk artist (1919-1962)

- Born: 1919; Nunavut
- Died: 1962 (aged 42–43); Cape Dorset, Nunavut
- Known for: drawings, prints, and graphite works

Natsivaar (also written as Netsivarr; 1919 – 1962) was an Inuk artist known for her drawings, prints, and graphite works.

Natsivaar was born in Nunavut in 1919. She lived a nomadic lifestyle for most of her life and intermittently resided in Cape Dorset (now Kinngait). She began drawing while she resided in the settlement of Tikirak in the 1950s. Only two of her prints were published before her death: Mother and Son (in the 1960 Cape Dorset Print Collection) and Angels in the Moon (in the 1961/1962 collection). She died in Cape Dorset, Nunavut in 1962.

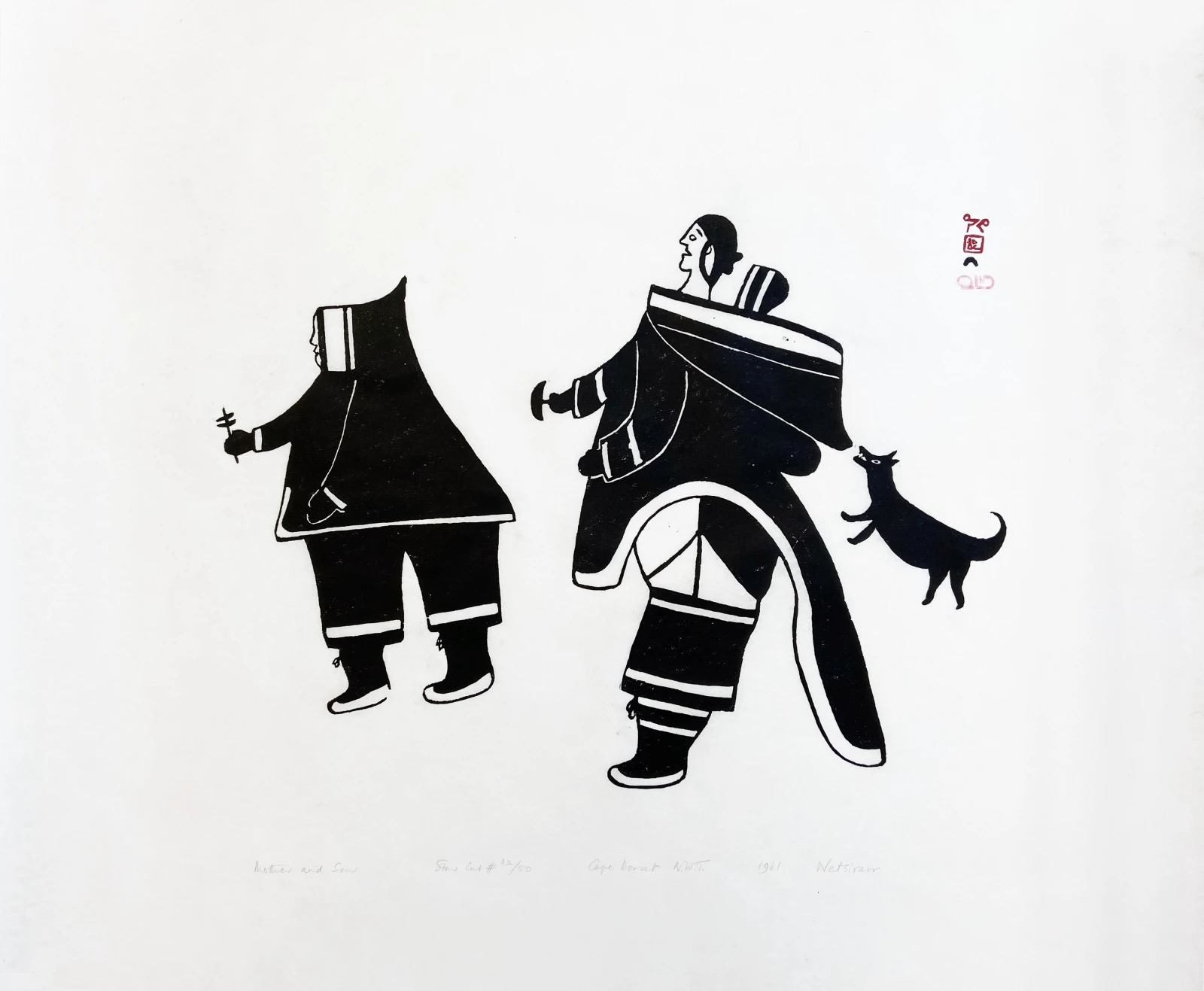
Mother and Son

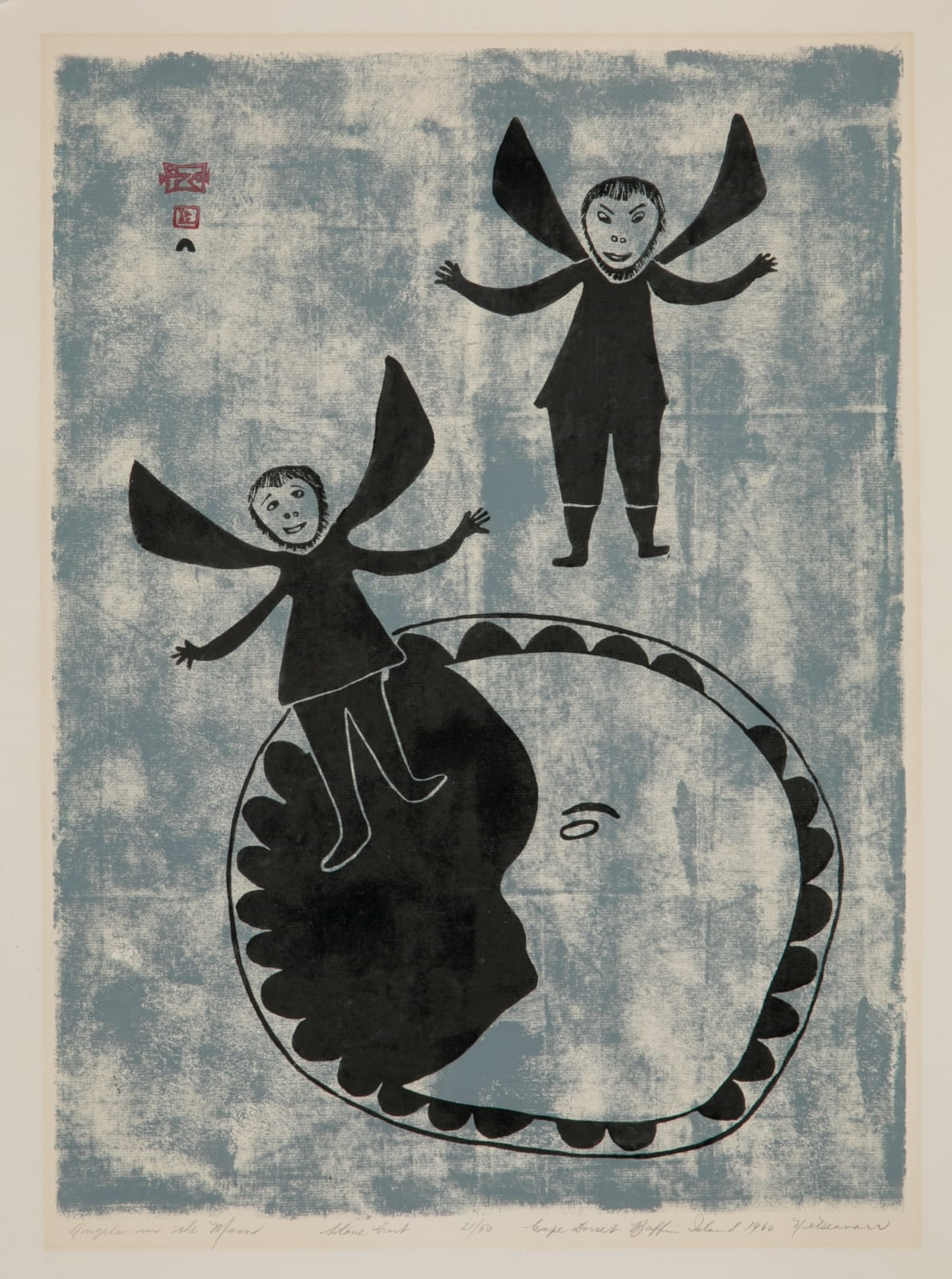
Angels in the Moon

Her work has been exhibited in the National Gallery of Canada and has also been included in the collections of the Art Gallery of Ontario, the Canadian Museum of History, the Glenbow Museum, and the National Gallery of Canada.

== See also ==
- Inuit art
- List of indigenous artists of the Americas
