= Bernadette Iguptark Tongelik =

Inuk artist

- Born: 1931; Wager Bay, Northwest Territories (now part of Nunavut)
- Died: 1980 (aged 48–49); Repulse Bay (Naujaat), Northwest Territories (now part of Nunavut)

Bernadette Iguptark Tongelik (1931-1980) was an Inuk artist known for her sculptural works.

== Early life ==
Bernadette Iguptark Tongelik was born in 1931 in Wager Bay, Nunavut to Irene Kataq Angutitok and Anthanese Angutitok, who were both artists.

== Work ==
Tongelik works in hand-carved stone. Transformation is a theme she works with; frequently her sculptures represent animals that shape-shift into human form.

== Collections ==
Her work is included in the collections of the National Gallery of Canada, the Government of Nunavut and the Winnipeg Art Gallery, York University art collection, the Museum of Anthropology, the Peary-MacMillan Arctic Museum, among others.

== See also ==
- Inuit art
- List of Indigenous artists of the Americas
