= Alejandro Mario Yllanes =

Aymara painter and printmaker

- Born: 1913; Oruro, Bolivia
- Died: 1960 (aged 46–47)
- Citizenship: Bolivia (Aymara)
- Known for: figurative and landscape painting
- Awards: Guggenheim Fellowship

Alejandro Mario Yllanes (1913–1960) was an Aymara painter and printmaker from Bolivia. He disappeared from the public spotlight in 1946, after he was awarded, but did not claim, a Guggenheim Fellowship.

== Life and career ==
Alejandro Yllanes was born in Oruro in 1913. He first worked as a tin miner. His art career began with an exhibition in his hometown in 1930 when he was only 17 years old. He went on to show in La Paz and other cities, including Mexico City. As an easel painter, Yllanes was extremely militant and portrayed the Bolivian government's mistreatment of Native South Americans in his paintings. The Bolivian government exiled the artist due to his political stance.

In the 1940s, Yllanes served as a cultural attache to the Bolivian Embassy in Mexico. During this time he had a solo exhibition at the Palacio de Bellas Artes, and Diego Rivera wrote the introduction to the show's catalog.

Yllanes moved to 419 West 115th Street in New York City. He returned to Mexico, leaving his artwork behind in New York. It is thought he died there in 1960, but in fact, not much is known of his later years. Who's Who in Art continued to list him until 1972.

== Art ==
Yllanes was inspired by Bolivia's precolumbian heritage and the native peoples of his homelands. His stylized, figurative work often includes Andean clothing, such as woolen helmets. He also painted landscapes, often on humble supports, such as burlap. Yllanes also draw in graphite, charcoal and ink, and printed with woodblocks and lithography. His palette tended towards warm earth tones

In 1934, he painted tempera murals on the schoolhouse walls of Warisata, a rural commune on the Bolivian shores of Lake Titicaca. Although never fully completed, these murals portray the daily labors of the commune and focused on sustainable productivity. The murals included scenes of ferryman crossing Lake Titicaca on reed boats and Aymara people farming, working with leather, and having a picnic. Other murals portrayed Andean history and cultural beliefs.

His work is in the collection of the Museum of Modern Art, and he received much critical acclaim during his lifetime. Nicholas Clemente curated a show of Yllanes' work in New York in 1992, entitled, "Being Discovered: The Spanish Conquest from the Amer-Indian Point of View." He says that Yllanes remains a highly popular artist in Bolivia.

== Published work ==
- Mario Yllanes, Alejandro and Linda Weintraub. Being discovered: the Spanish conquest from the Amer-Indian point of view: Alejandro Mario Yllanes: from the collection of Edward and Teresa Ford. Annandale-on-Hudson, New York: Edith C. Blum Art Institute, 1992.
- Mario Alejandro Yllanes, A Bolivian Muralist, Catalogue Raisonné of Paintings Drawings and Graphic Works by Victoria Combalia for Martin du Louvre, Paris. https://www.martindulouvre.com/publications/catalogue-mario-alejandro-yllanes/

== See also ==
- Latin American art
- List of Latin American artists
