= Chafil Cheucarama =

Wounaan artist and illustrator from Panama

Chafil Cheucarama M.
- Born: Darién Province, Panama
- Education: Degree in graphic design
- Known for: drawing, illustration, painting, tagua carving
- Notable work: La Cestería, Un Trabajo Femenino, Vocabulario Ilustrado: Wounmeu, Español, Epena Pedee
- Style: Indigenous art; zoomorphic and representational forms
- Movement: Indigenous art of Panama
- Relatives: Lanky Cheucarama (son); Selerino Cheucarama (cousin)
- Awards: First prize, OAS Children's Book Fair (1994)

Chafil Cheucarama M. is a Wounaan artist and illustrator from Darién Province, Panama.

== Early life ==
As a child Cheucarama watched his father carved intricate zoomorphic sculptures. He began carving tagua seeds, known as "vegetable ivory", as well. The linguist Ron Binder noticed Cheucarama's artistic skills in the village of Aruza in the early 1970s. The teenager carved representational toys from balsa wood. Binder invited Cheucarama to move to Alcalde Díaz, where the young man was able to take art classes. Later he earned a degree in graphic design.

== Art career ==
The historian Reina Torres de Araúz hired Cheucarama to illustrate several of his books. He was selected as "Panama's best illustrator." Representing the Americas, he won first place in an OAS Children's Book Fair in Italy in 1994. Besides drawing with pen and ink, Cheucarama also paints in acrylics. He is regarded as one of the most prominent artists in the Wounaan community.

In 1998, Cheucarama was part of the show, "Tributo a la Patria" (Tribute to the Homeland). In 2010, he exhibited at the Galería Manuel E. Amador in the University of Panama, as part of the group exhibit, "Expo Docente."

== Personal ==
The artist's son, Lanky Cheucarama is a notable tagua seed carver and a zookeeper at the Summit Zoo for the Panama Amphibian Rescue and Conservation Project. Chafil Cheucarama's cousin, Selerino Cheucarama is a respected sculptor working in cocobolo wood and tagua seeds.

== Published work ==
- Peña, Toño and Chafil Cheucarama M. Jãga wounaanau hãwãrr t'õojẽ: La pesca entre los wounaan. Panama. 1979.
- Chindío Peña Ismare and Chafil Cheucarama M. Estudiante majepienau nem hĩgkʼatarr: cuentos y experiencias de algunos estudiantes de Majé en woun meu. Panama: Instituto Nacional de Cultura, 1980.
- Ton̋o Pen̋a and Chafil M. Cheucarama. La Cestería, Un Trabajo Femenino (The Basketry of the Waunana Women). Panama: Instituto Nacional de Cultura, 1980.
- Chafil Cheucarama M.; Ronald Binder; Phillip Lee Harms; Chindio Pena Ismare. Vocabulario Ilustrado: Wounmeu, Espanol, Epena Pedee. Bogotá: Asociacion Instituto Linguistico de Verano, 1995. ISBN 978-9582-10-142-8.
- Gilma A Guerra de López; Chafil Cheucarama M. El árbol y el ruiseñor y otros cuentos. Panamá : Instituto Nacional de Cultura, 1995. Juvenile fiction.

== Books ==
- Callaghan, Margo M. Darién Rainforest Basketry. 4th Ed. Sun Lakes, AZ: HPL Enterprises, 2009. ISBN 978-9962-00-640-4.
