= Jingle dress =

Native American and First Nations dance

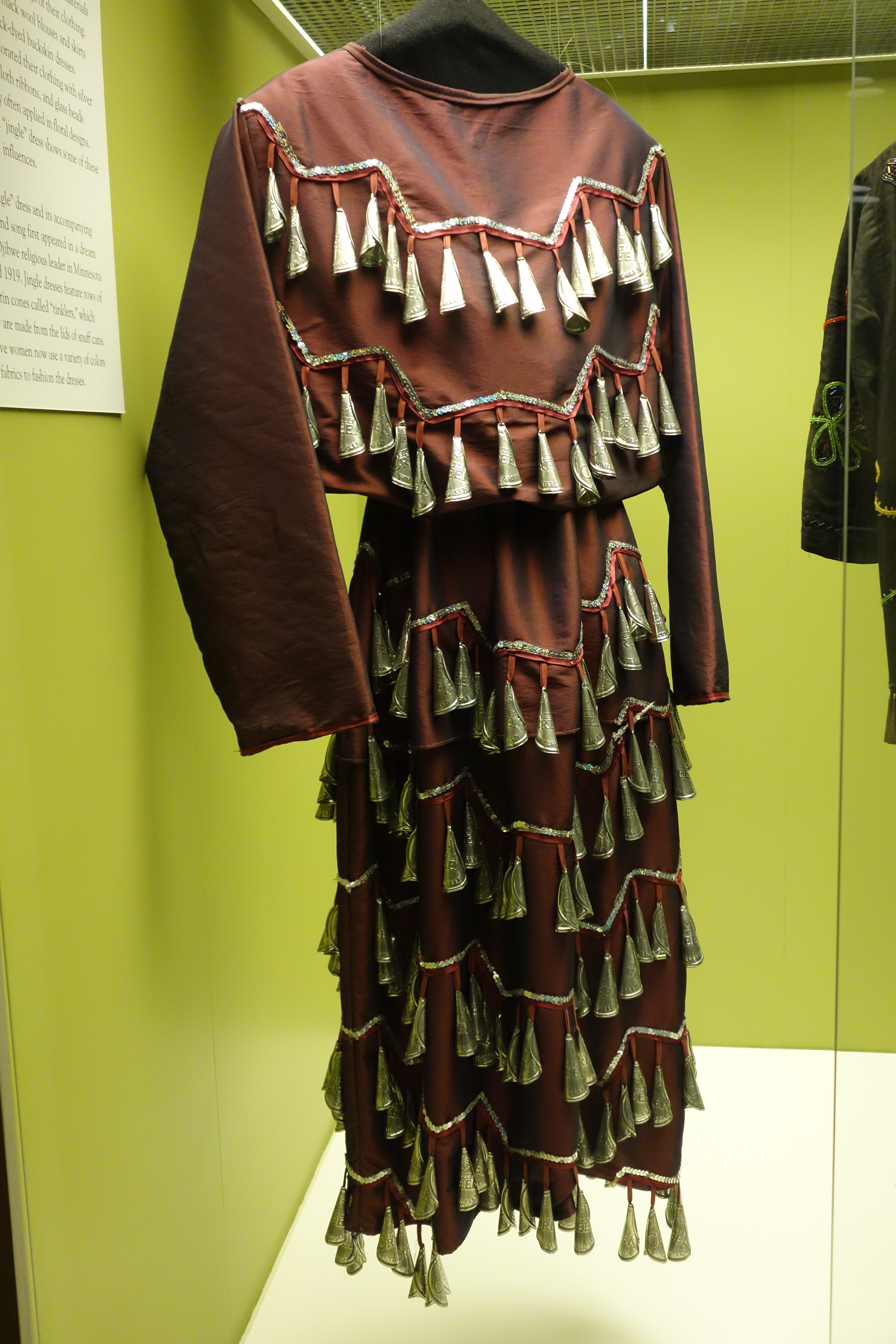
An Ojibwe jingle dress in the Wisconsin Historical Museum

Jingle dress is a First Nations and Native American women's pow wow regalia and dance. North Central College associate professor Matthew Krystal notes, in his book, Indigenous Dance and Dancing Indian: Contested Representation in the Global Era, that "Whereas men's styles offer Grass Dance as a healing themed dance, women may select Jingle Dress Dance." The regalia worn for the dance is a jingle dress, which includes ornamentation with multiple rows of metal, such as cones, that create a jingling sound as the dancer moves.

== Origins ==
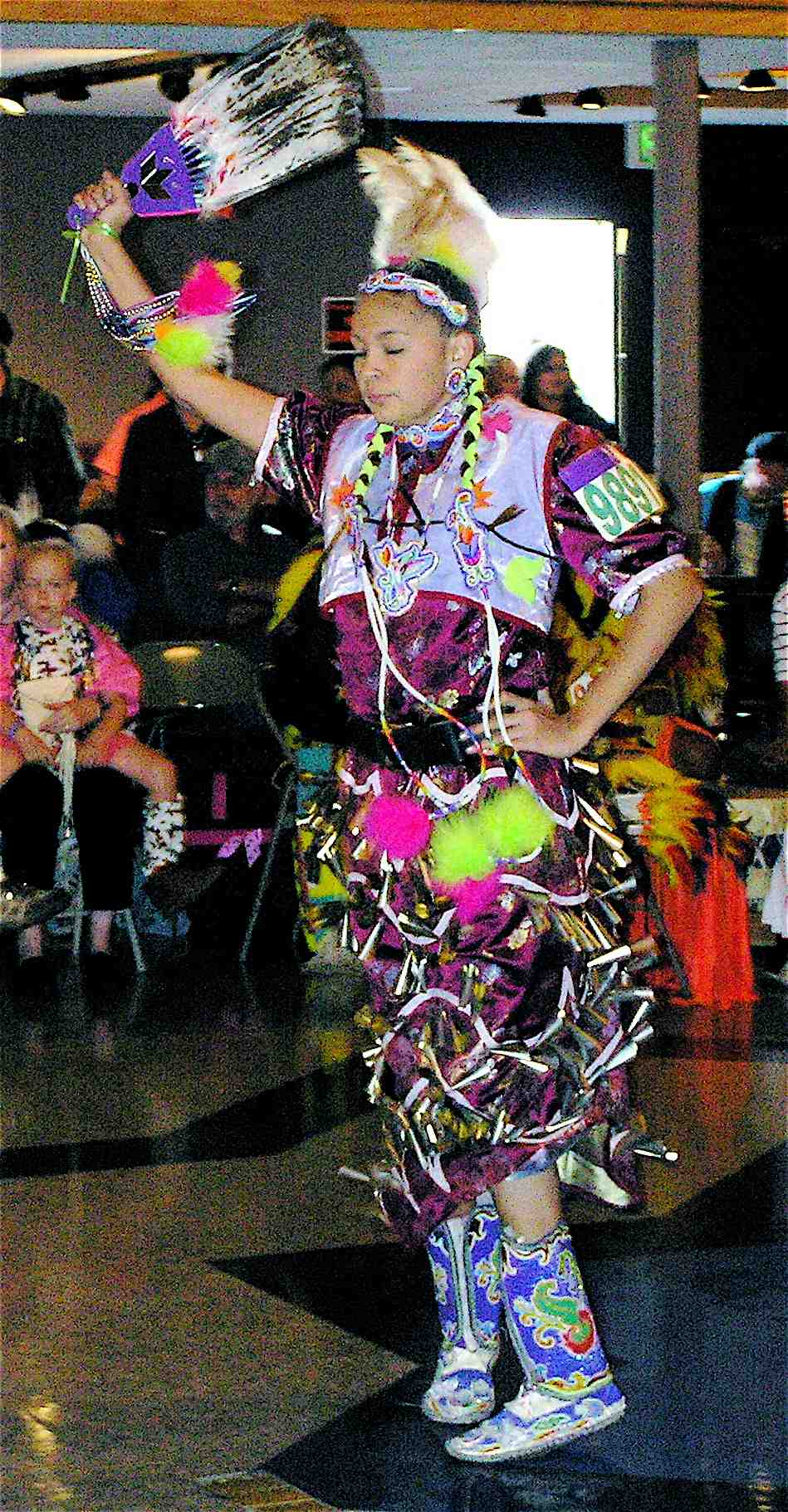
Teenaged jingle dress competitor, with fan

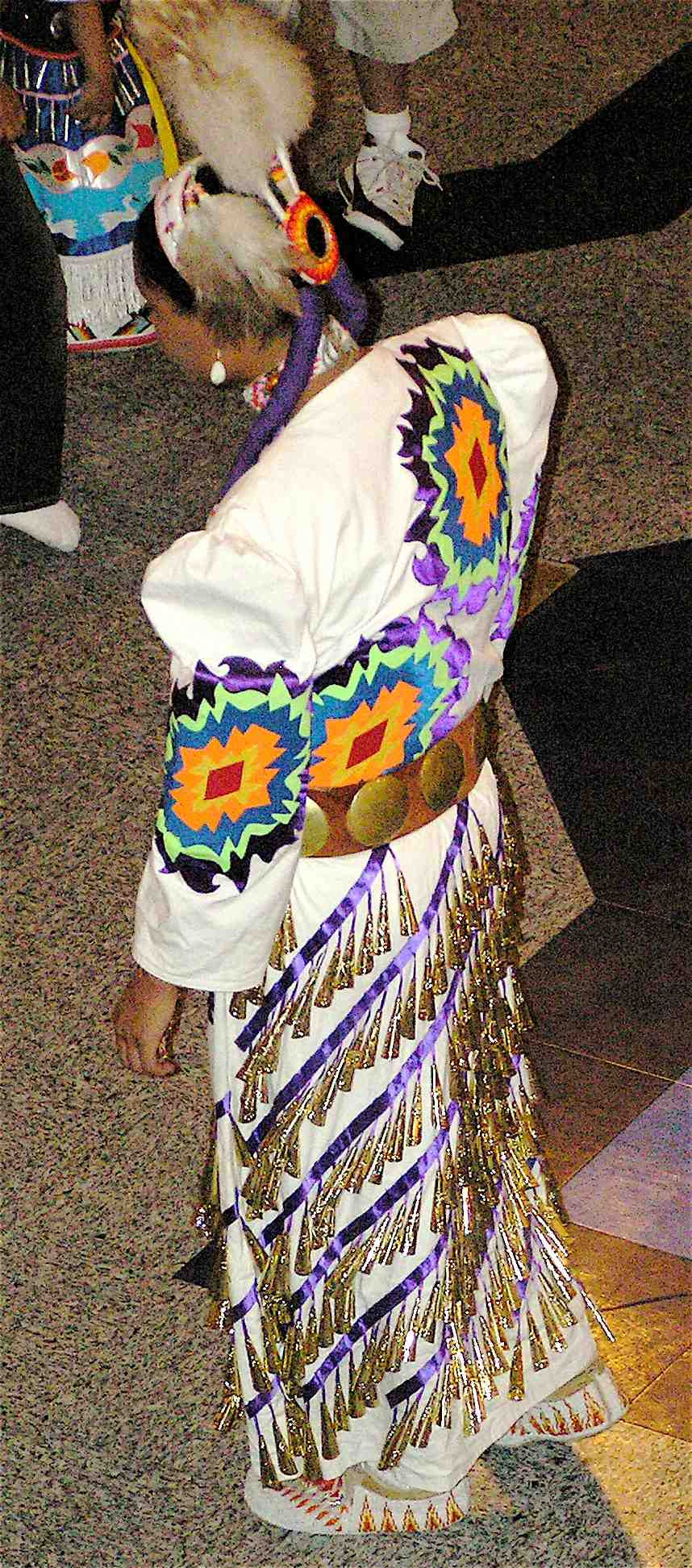
A contemporary jingle dress

Origin of the jingle dress is attributed to three different Ojibwa communities: the Mille Lacs, Red Lake Band of Chippewa and the Whitefish Bay Ojibwe. In both the Mille Lacs and Whitefish Bay versions, the dress and the dance appeared in a recurring vivid dream that was realized about the year 1900. In both versions, the dream came to a Midewinini (sometimes translated 'medicine man'). In both dreams, there were four women, each wearing a jingle dress and dancing. Each dream also gave instructions on how to make the dresses, what types of songs went with them and how the dance was to be performed. In the Mille Lacs' version, the Midewinini upon awakening, with his wife made four dresses. He showed his wife how to dance in the dress, which he showed to the four women he had dreamed about, by calling the four women who in his dream wore them, dressed them in the dresses, brought them forth at a dance, told the people about the dream, and how the way the Midewikweg were to dress and dance.

The Mille Lacs' version of the story continues that the reason for this recurring dream was because the daughter of the Midewinini was gravely ill. When it came time for the drum ceremony, the man and his wife brought their little girl. They sat at the ceremony, and the girl lay on the floor because she was quite ill. After the ceremony, the Midewinini got up and told the people about his dream. Then he brought out the four women and said they were going to dance in the style he had dreamed about. The drum started, the people began to sing, and the women danced. As the evening went on, the daughter was sitting up and watching. Before the night was over, the girl was so moved by the dancers that she was following the women and dancing around.

Whitefish Bay's version is nearly identical, but with the ill child being the granddaughter of the Midewinini. One night he had a vision of a spirit in a dress and the spirit told him that if he made this dress and put it on his grand daughter that she would become well. The medicine man made the dress and brought his grand daughter to the dance circle. The first round around the circle the girl could not walk so she was carried. The second time around the girl could walk but still needed help from some of the woman in the community. The next time around the circle the girl was able to walk by herself.

Due to both versions of the story, some women adopted the jingle dress as a healing dress. People often give jingle dress dancers tobacco to have them pray for themselves or people they care for that are not well.

Due to the strong family connections between the Removable and Non-Removable Mille Lacs Indians of the Mille Lacs and White Earth Indian Reservations, the Mille Lacs Indians' version spread to White Earth and to other Ojibwe Reservations. In the late 1920s, the White Earth people gave the jingle dress to the Lakota and it spread westward into the Dakotas and Montana.

== Description ==
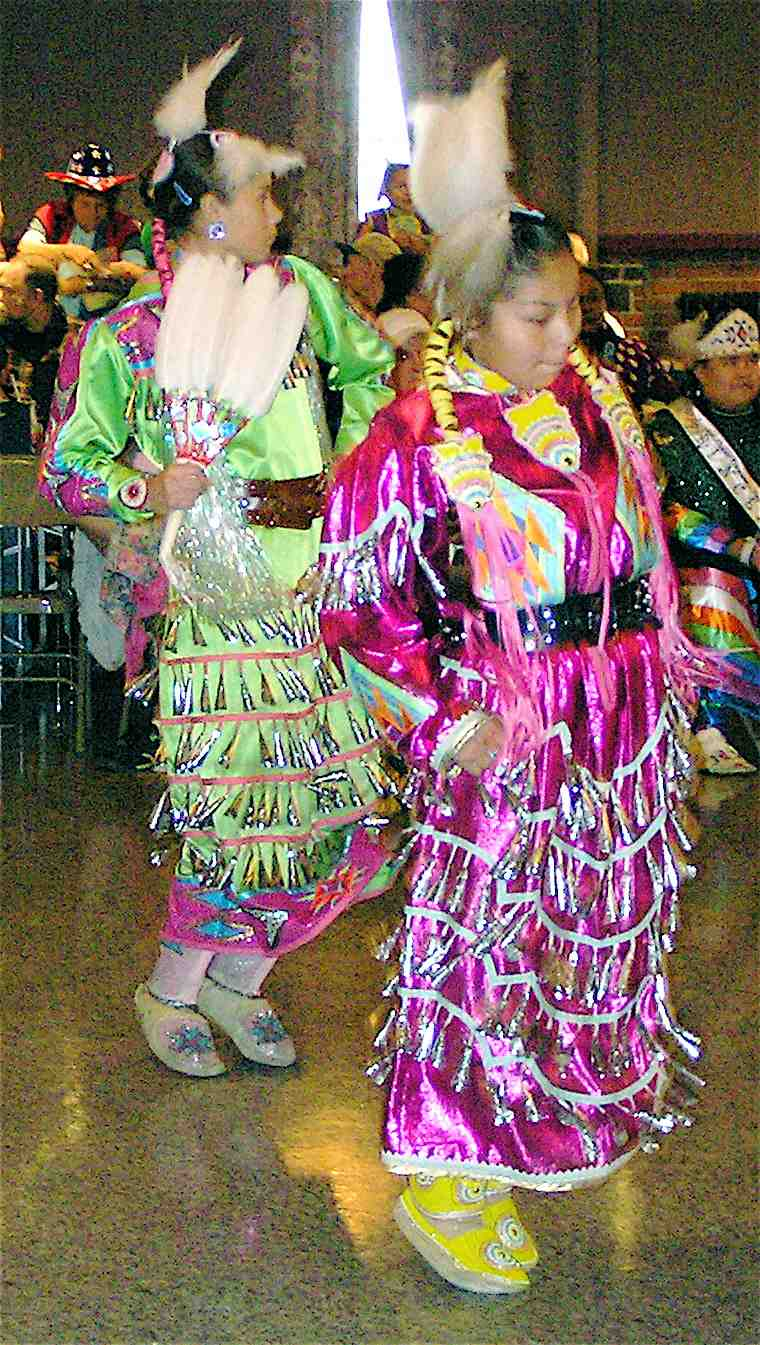
Girls in contemporary jingle dress competition

=== Footwork ===
The traditional jingle dance is characterized by the jingle dress and light footwork danced close to ground. The dancer dances in a pattern, her feet do not cross, they do not dance backward or turn a complete circle. Compared to the original dance, the contemporary dance can be fancier, with intricate footwork and the dress design is often cut to accommodate these footwork maneuvers. Contemporary dancers do often cross their feet, turn full circles and dance backwards. Such moves exemplify the differences between contemporary and traditional jingle dress dancing.

=== Regalia ===
Jingle dresses were initially made of fabric in solid, "healthy" colours – red, green/yellow, black and blue. Each dress was adorned with jingles on the sleeves, the top, and one, two, or three rows of jingles on the bottom. The jingles were made from chewing tobacco can lids, rolled into cones.

Contemporary jingle dresses, introduced in the 1980s, are made from multi-colored fabric decorated with jingles made of tin or other metals. The jingle count on a child's dress is approximately 100 to 130 or 140, and for a woman's size, the amount varies depending on the dress design. The contemporary dancer carries a feather fan, often wearing eagle plumes or feathers in her hair.

== Sources ==
- DesJarlait, Robert. "The Contest Powwow versus the Traditional Powwow and the Role of the Native American Community", Wíčazo Ša Review, Vol. 12, No. 1 (Spring, 1997), pp. 115–127
- McCollum, Ray. Saskatchewan Indian, Fall 2002
- Sexsmith, Pamela. The healing gift of the jingle dance
- Smallwood, Larry "Amik". The story of the Jingle Dress
