= Julia Marden =

Native American basket maker and textile artist

- Born: 1962 (age 63–64)
- Citizenship: Wampanoag Tribe of Gay Head and U.S.
- Known for: Textile art, basketry

Julia Marden (born 1962) is a Native American artist based in Vermont. A member of the Aquinnah Wampanoag tribe, Marden specializes in traditional Wampanoag arts and crafts, including basket and mat twining, wampum belts, and painting.

== Early life and education ==
Marden was born in 1962 and raised in Falmouth, Massachusetts, and also spent parts of her childhood in Vineyard Haven on Martha's Vineyard. Her father was a carpenter, and as a child she would use his wood shavings to make her own art. She also made collages from found objects.

== Art career ==
Marden began learning customary crafts in the early 1990s, from Native American staff, when she began working in the Wampanoag Indian Program at Plimoth Plantation. Specifically, Marden learned twining, a type of weaving technique which involves wrapping fibers around one another without using a loom. She had created 63 twined pieces by 2012. It takes Marden about two months of 40-hour weeks to twine a bag with commercial cordage. For more historic twining, which takes longer, Marden uses cattails, bulrushes, and cornhusks, among other plants. Porcupine quills or moose hair may also be worked into the designs.

Marden has also created miniature dolls, which she calls Eninuog, which represent Native people and the clothing they wore at the time of European contact.

Marden has her own studio and store in Ryegate, Vermont, named Bluejay Visions. She has shown her work at the Atrium Gallery in One Capitol Hill, the Mashantucket Pequot Museum, the National Heritage Museum, the Rhode Island Department of Administration, the Robbins Museum, and the Wisconsin Museum of Quilts and Fiber Arts.

In 2022, Marden was one of eight Wampanoag artists profiled in Lee Roscoe's book, Wampanoag Art for the Ages: Traditional and Transitional.

In 2023, Marden created a turkey feather mantle she had twined by hand, making it the first-known such mantle created post-European contact 400 years earlier. Marden called it "most likely the most important piece" she will ever make. It will be shown at the Aquinnah Cultural Center in 2024.

== Personal life ==
Marden has one daughter, Leah Llanes, who learned to twine at age 6. Leah Llanes 3 daughters have also learned to twine. Julia also has a son Joshua and a grandson.

Marden was given the name Bluejay Weaving in a Wampanoag naming ceremony, in honor of her craftsmanship and the fierceness with which blue jays protect their young.

Marden has resided in Vermont since at least 2015, but has also previously lived in Cape Cod.
