= Babe and Carla Hemlock =

Kahnawake Mohawk artist couple from Quebec

- Born: Donald Hemlock and Carla; Both were born in 1961
- Citizenship: Mohawks of Kahnawà:ke
- Known for: Native American art
- Notable work: Tribute to Mohawk Ironworkers
- Movement: Haudenosaunee art
- Awards: Best in class awards at the Santa Fe Indian Market and Heard Museum Guild Fair
- Patrons: National Museum of the American Indian
- Website: www.babeandcarlahemlock.com

Babe and Carla Hemlock are a Kahnawake Mohawk husband-and-wife artisan team from Kahnawake Mohawk Nation Territory near Montreal. Babe specializes in woodcarving, and Carla focuses on textile arts; however, they work in a range of different artistic media. Carla has been recognized for her award-winning quilt work, which has been purchased by the National Museum of the American Indian, part of the Smithsonian Institution in Washington, D.C.

== Background ==
Carla, born 1961, is from Kahnawake near Montreal, Quebec. Babe, also born in 1961, grew up in Brooklyn, New York. He is a fourth generation Mohawk ironworker.

== Art career ==
Both of the Hemlocks relay Mohawk culture and history through their artwork. Babe and Carla collaborate with each other to create political art works, as well. Babe carved and painted Walking in Two Worlds, and Carla created a quilt Tribute to Mohawk Ironworkers, which combined beadwork and appliquéd figured inspired by Charles Ebbets' iconic 1932 photograph of Mohawk men perched on a suspended I-beam. These pay homage to the late-19th century and 20th-century Mohawk construction workers, who helped build the highrises of New York City, including the Empire State Building. Her quilt, Haudenosaunee Passport, addresses the sovereignty of the Haudenosaunee Nations that predate Canada and the United States of America.

Babe constructs wooden cradleboards that he carves and paints with his own artistic imagery. "He's really addressing stereotypes and identity issues," says Bruce Hartman, director of the Nerman Museum of Contemporary Art. In 2013, the couple collaborated on a cradleboard focused on the aboriginal game of lacrosse, which won the 2013 Santa Fe Indian Market Best of Classification for Diverse Art Forms.

Carla describes her work as meant to "engage conversations about issues that continue on her people's lands." One of the issues that Carla confronts in her work includes fracking, hoping to draw attention to the long term effects it may have on the land in a way that fosters conversation. This is seen in her Turtle Island Unraveling, a cotton quilt with glass beads. Carla has also used treaty cloth in her works, the cloth dating back to the 1700s with the original language of the Treaty of Canandaigua. The use of this cloth is to draw attention to her people still upholding their end of the treaty, even when the United States government did not.

The couple won Best of Classification for Diverse Art Forms at the Santa Fe Indian Market again in 2014.

Carla Hemlock's piece, Our Destruction, was acquired by the Smithsonian American Art Museum as part of the Renwick Gallery's 50th Anniversary Campaign.

While the Hemlocks use political imagery in their artwork—for instance, questioning the long term effects of fracking—they also use aboriginal Iroquoian imagery. For instance, Carla uses images of turtles in her quilts.

== Collections ==
- National Museum of the American Indian, Washington, DC
- Nerman Museum of Contemporary Art, Overland Park, KS

== Major exhibitions ==
- Changing Hands III: Art Without Reservations, Museum of Arts and Design, curated by Ellen Taubman
- Iroquois Artistic Visions: From Sky World to Turtle Island, Iroquois Indian Museum, Howes Cave, New York
- Walking With Our Sisters, traveling exhibit, curated by Christi Belcourt
