= Mark Tungilik =

Inuk sculptor and ivory carver (d. 1986)

Mark Tungilik (1913?–1986) was an Inuk sculptor from Nunavut who specialized in miniature ivory carvings.

== Early life ==
Tungilik was born in either 1904 or 1913 in the Spence Bay area. He later moved to Pelly Bay and then Naujaat.

== Career ==
In 1945 Roman Catholic missionaries encouraged Tungilik to start carving ivory. One of the pieces he carved was presented to Pope Pius XII in 1948. He was known to bring his carvings with him on his boat, to work on them while hunting.

Tungilik's work often depicts Arctic animals, including seals, weasels, caribou, muskoxes, owls, polar bears, and walruses. Many of his pieces also depict hunting scenes, as well as Christian religious imagery.

In 2013, one of Tungilik's carvings of a muskox was featured on an episode of Antiques Roadshow.

Tungilik's work is held in several museums worldwide, including the Canadian Museum of Civilization, the University of Michigan Museum of Art, the Museum of Anthropology at University of British Columbia, the Canadian Guild of Crafts Quebec, the National Gallery of Canada, the University of Lethbridge Art Gallery, the Winnipeg Art Gallery, the Prince of Wales Northern Heritage Centre, the Art Gallery of Toronto, Portland Art Museum, and the Metropolitan Museum of Art.

In his older age, Tungilik began to lose his vision, but continued carving.

His grandson Jesse Tungilik is a multidisciplinary artist.
