= Faye Tso =

Diné potter (1933–2004)

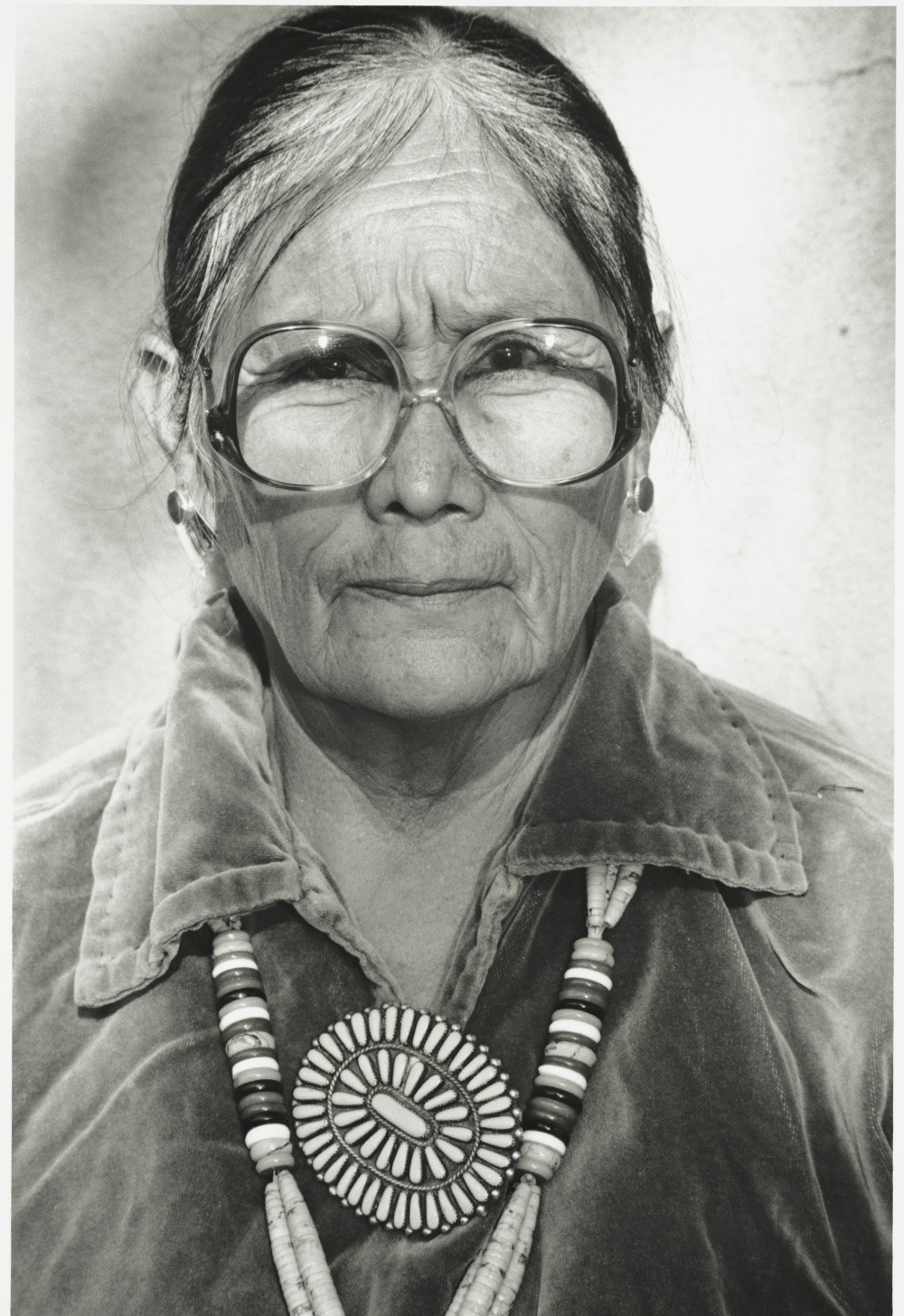
- Faye Tso, c. 1990
- Born: 1933; Coal Mine Mesa, Arizona
- Died: 2004 (aged 70–71); Tuba City, Navajo Nation, Arizona
- Known for: Ceramics, herbal medicine

Faye Tso (1933–2004) was a Navajo potter and herbal medicine healer. Her pieces are known for their nontraditional imagery of corn maidens, warriors, and dancers, whereas Navajo pottery typically has little decoration.

== Early life ==
Born in Coal Mine Mesa, Arizona in 1933, Tso was relocated with other Navajos to Tuba City, Arizona in 1974 because of a land dispute between the Navajo and Hopi tribes.

== Artistic career ==
Tso returned to dig her clay at Coal Mine Mesa, where she also gathered pinon from which she extracted the pitch resin used to coat and seal her Dineh pottery.

In 1990, the Arizona Indian Living Treasures Association designated Tso as a living treasure. Her husband and son are medicine men and use Tso's pots in their ceremonies.

== Noted works ==
Tso's works have sold for over $1,000, and several of her pieces are held in the Smithsonian American Art Museum:

- Head of Emmett, c. 1985, fired clay with piñon pitch, Smithsonian American Art Museum, 1997.124.175
- Bean Pot with Incised Corn Maiden Figures, 1987, fired clay with piñon pitch, Smithsonian American Art Museum, 1997.124.176
- Pot with Dancers with Headdresses and Rattles, c. 1985, fired clay with piñon pitch, Smithsonian American Art Museum, 1997.124.177
- Pot with Figurative Decoration, c. 1992, fired clay with piñon pitch, Smithsonian American Art Museum, 1997.124.178

== Gallery ==
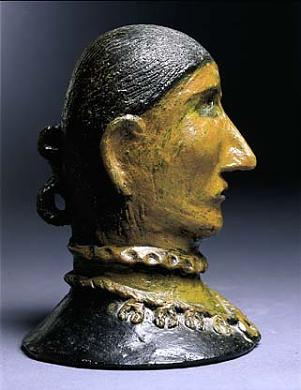
Head of Emmett, circa 1985, by Faye Tso, fired clay with piñon pitch, Smithsonian American Art Museum,

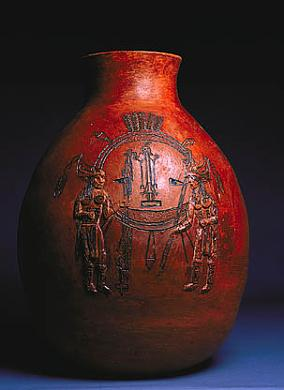
Pot with Figurative Decoration

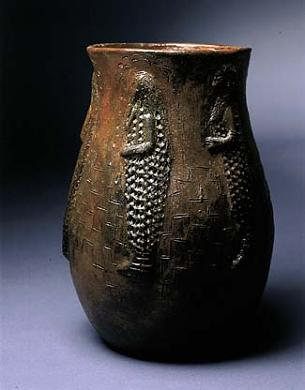
Bean Pot with Incised Corn Maiden Figures

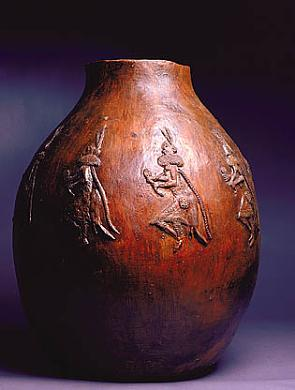
Pot with Dancers with Headdresses and Rattles, ca. 1985 by Faye Tso, fired clay with piñon pitch
