= Clara Sherman =

Navajo artist

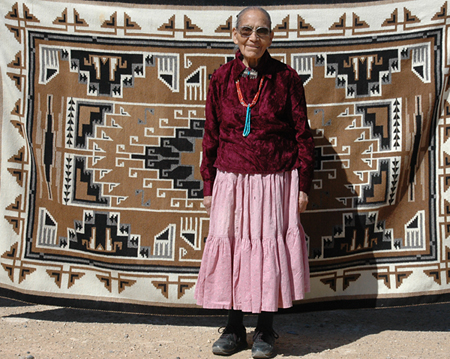
- Clara Sherman in 2007
- Born: Nezbah Gould; February 18, 1914; Near the Toadlena-Newcomb area
- Died: July 31, 2010 (aged 96)
- Known for: Weaving
- Movement: Navajo rugs
- Awards: Lifetime Achievement Award, Southwestern Association for Indian Arts, August, 2004; New Mexico Governor's Award for Excellence in the Arts, 2006

Clara Nezbah Sherman (February 18, 1914 – July 31, 2010) was a Navajo artist particularly known for her Navajo rugs. Born Nezbah Gould, her mother was of the Hashtłʼishnii clan, and her father was of the Naashashí Dineʼé. She was the last surviving member of ten siblings including an adopted sister. Sherman and her siblings learned to weave as children from her family, who specialized in the craft. Clara had several children with her husband, John Sherman. Her daughters and granddaughters also learned to weave.

She played the harmonica, and could "keep a melody and bass line going at the same time."

In 2006, she was awarded the Governor's Award for Excellence in the Arts by the governor of New Mexico in association with the National Endowment for the Arts. She is one of the artists whose work is available at the historic Toadlena Trading Post on New Mexico Arts' Fiber Arts Trail.
