= Dora Old Elk =

Artist from the Crow Indian Reservation in Montana

Dora Old Elk (born 1977) is an Apsáalooke (Crow/Absaroke)/Sioux artist who grew up on the Crow Indian Reservation in Billings, Montana. A dance dress made by Dora Old Elk is in the permanent collection of the National Museum of the American Indian in Washington, D.C. She also dances Women's Northern Traditional dance. Of her dance dresses she has said, 'I see my outfit as an individual itself. When I put it on, there's no other way to really represent myself than to be out there and dancing. It feels really, really good. It's like nothing that I've ever felt before.' Old Elk is married, and now goes by Dora Birdshead.

The band Warscout recorded a Pow Wow song "Apsaalooke Double Beat" for Old Elk in 2008.
