= Tivi Ilisituk =

Inuk carver and printmaker (1933-2012)

Tivi Ilisituk (January 2, 1933 – 2012) was an Inuk hunter and carver from Salluit, Quebec.

== Background ==
Ilisituk was born on January 2, 1933, and began carving in 1954, using light gray stone from the Kovik River. He also created prints. Ilisituk died in 2012.

== Career ==
Ilisituk's work primarily features hunting themes. in 1967, one of his sculptures was featured in Eskimo Sculpture, a highly acclaimed exhibition that the Winnipeg Art Gallery organized and presented at the Manitoba Legislative Building.

Ilisituk had two solo exhibitions during his life time: Sculptures by Tivi Ilisituk at the Becket Art Gallery of Hamilton, Ontario in 1970 and Tivi Ilisituk: A Study in Cultural Realism at Arctic Artistry in New York City, United States in 1986.

Ilisituk's work is held in several museums, including the British Museum, the National Gallery of Canada, the University of Toronto Art Collection, and the University of Michigan Museum of Art.
