= Simon Tookoome =

Utkusiksalingmiut Inuk artist (1934–2010)

Simon Tookoome (December 9, 1934, Chantrey Inlet – November 7, 2010 Baker Lake) was an Utkusiksalingmiut Inuk artist.

== Life ==
In his youth, Tookoome and other Utkusiksalingmiut lived along the Back River and in Gjoa Haven on King William Island. Here he met and was influenced by the Netsilik Inuit.

He moved to Baker Lake, Nunavut, Canada in the 1960s when his Inuit band was threatened with starvation. After the arrival of arts advisors in 1969, Tookoome began to draw and carve stones. He was a founding member of the Sanavik Co-op.

Tookoome died in Baker Lake, Nunavut on 7 November 2010.

== Work ==
He was the author, with Sheldon Oberman, of the children's book Shaman's Nephew: A Life in the Far North, which won the $10,000 Norma Fleck Award for Canadian children's non-fiction in 2000. This autobiographical book deals with Tookoome's youthful experiences of the traditional Inuit way of life, including experiences with hunting and encountering non-Inuit culture for the first time. He was also included in Irene Avaalaaqiaq Myth and Reality:

In the winter of 1957 to 1958, the caribou took a different route to the calving grounds. We could not find them. All the animals were scarce. We were left waiting and many of the people died of hunger. My family did not suffer as much as others. None of us died. We kept moving and looking. We survived on fish. We had thirty dogs. All but four died but we only had to eat one of them. The rest we left behind. We did not feel it was right to eat them or feed them to the other dogs. My father and his brothers had gone ahead to hunt. We had lost a lot of weight and were very hungry. I left the igloo and I knelt and prayed at a great rock. This was the first time I had ever prayed. Then five healthy caribou appeared on the ice and they did not run away. I thought I would not be able to catch them because there were no shadows. The land was flat without even a rock for cover. However, I was able to kill them with little effort. I was so grateful, that I shook their hooves as a sign of gratitude because they gave themselves up to my hunger. I melted the snow with my mouth and gave them each a drink. I was careful in removing the sinews so as to ease their spirits' pain. This is the traditional way to show thanks. Because of what those caribou did, I always hunted in this way. I respected the animals.

— Nasby, 2002

In addition to being an accomplished artist, Tookoome was renowned as a master whipper.
