= Linda and Merton Sisneros =

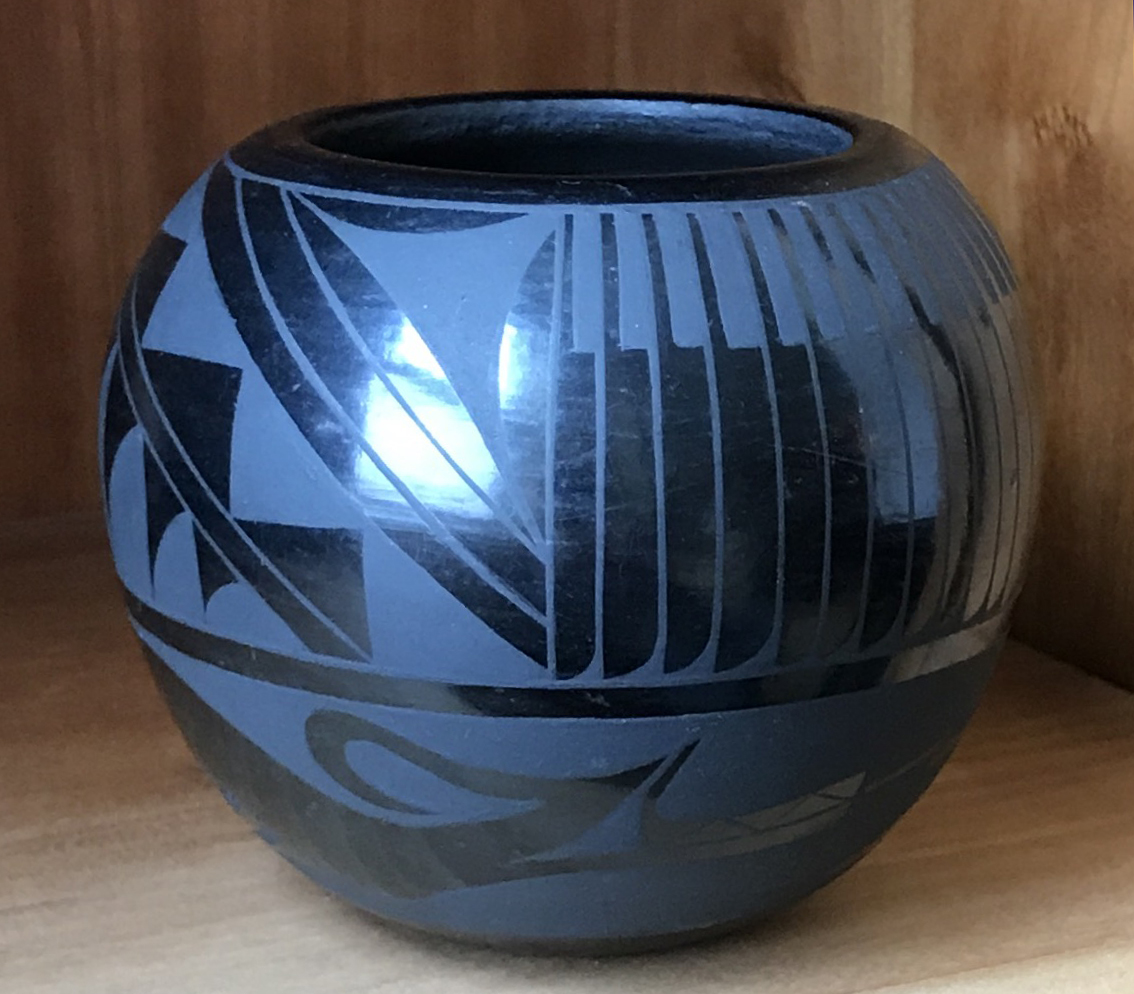
- Traditional black-on-black pot crafted by the Sisneros, featuring kiva steps, feathers, and Avanyu, the water spirit.
- Known for: Ceramics

Linda Sisneros and Merton Sisneros are Native American potters from Santa Clara Pueblo, New Mexico, United States.

Both Linda and Merton, a married couple, have a long heritage of pottery in their families. Together they carry on these family traditions, and include on their pottery a triangle mark to symbolize three generations of potting. Their pots are traditional hand-coiled, pit-fired pueblo pottery from local clay. The couple does a few of the deep-carved pots typical of Santa Clara pottery, but mostly makes painted black-on-black and red-on-red pottery. They are among only a few potters in Santa Clara who continue to make the black-on-black pottery in the traditional manner.

Merton Sisneros has won awards for workmanship, including the Award of Excellence in Figurative Clay from the Southwest Indian Art Fair for his Winter and Summer Owls.

In 2006, Merton Sisneros was removed from his elected position as Vice Chairman on the Santa Fe Palace of the Governors portal committee after a petition was signed by 200 fellow artists claiming he (and committee chairman Glenn Paquin, and Allen Bruce Paquin, the chairman's son) were not living up to their responsibilities. However, their removal by the state's Department of Cultural Affairs was controversial, viewed by some as unwarranted intrusion into self-administration by the artists displaying their work at the portal.
