= Natalie Ball =

Klamath/Modoc interdisciplinary artist

- Born: 1980 (age 45–46); Portland, Oregon
- Education: MFA Yale School of Art (2018), MA Massey University (2010), BA University of Oregon (2005)
- Awards: Betty Bowen Award (2018), Lilla Jewel Fund Award, Santo Foundation Award, Joan Shipley Award, Oregon Arts Commission Fellowship

Natalie Ball (born 1980) is a Klamath/Modoc interdisciplinary artist based in Chiloquin, Oregon.

== Background ==
Born in Portland, Oregon, Ball is enrolled in the Klamath Tribes. She is also of African-American, Modoc, and Anglo-American descent. Ball is a descendant of Kientpaush, also known as Captain Jack (1837–1873), the chief who led the Modocs to fight the United States in the 1872 Modoc War. Her grandfather was a painter, and her aunt Peggy Ball, was a quiltmaker. Her family moved from Klamath lands to Portland, Oregon, after the Klamath Termination Act was passed in 1954.

Ball has three children, including daughter Lofanitani Aisea.

== Education ==
Ball earned her bachelor's degree in art and ethnic studies from the University of Oregon, and her master's degree in Maori Visual Arts from Massey University in Palmerston North, New Zealand. She earned her MFA from Yale University School of Art in painting and printmaking in 2018.

== Artwork ==
Bang bang (2019) at the Rubell Museum in 2021

Ball's art practice includes installation art, performance art, mixed-media textile art, sculpture, painting, and printmaking. Her textiles often combine stitched words with quilts and dolls that draw upon Modoc and Klamath history. Her aunt taught her quilt making when Ball was young, inspiring the adult artist to challenge assumptions about materials, matrilineal craft, and textiles.

Ball's installation at the 2015 One Flaming Arrow Indigenous Art, Music, & Film Festival in Portland, Oregon incorporated a variety of materials. These included coyote heads, Ball's handmade quilts, and original 19th century newspaper clippings about her great-great-grandfather Kientpaush. Oregon Public Broadcasting noted that freshly cut wood in the installation, "Mapping Coyote Black," rendered the gallery "thick and sweet with piney smells."

Of the installation, Ball has said, "Everyone knows that Coyote is a trickster: intelligent and powerful, and at times Coyote plays the fool. I offer Coyote to viewers as a woman, the avatar of myself as an artist."

Ball characterizes motherhood as central to her identity as an artist and writes that her work "examines internal and external discourses that shape Indian identity." Ball cites performance artist Coco Fusco as an inspiration, particularly Fusco's influential performance piece "Two Undiscovered Amerindians Visit the West," created in collaboration with Guillermo Gómez-Peña.

== Art career ==
Ball has exhibited internationally, including in Hungary and New Zealand. She was included in the 15th Sharjah Biennial: Thinking Historically in the Present.

Nationally, Ball has exhibited at the Whitney Museum of American Art,Seattle Art Museum, Portland Art Museum, IAIA Museum of Contemporary Native Arts, SOMArts, Disjecta Contemporary Art Center, and the Nerman Museum of Contemporary Art, where she created an installation, Mapping Coyote Black in 2015.

== Awards and honors ==
Ball's many awards include the MRG Foundation's Lilla Jewel Fund Award, Santo Foundation Award, and Oregon Arts Commission's Joan Shipley Award (2016). Also in 2016, the Oregon Arts Commission named Ball an Individual Artist Fellow. In 2018, the Seattle Art Museum gave her the Betty Bowen Award. In 2019, Crow's Shadow Institute of the Arts awarded her a Golden Spot Residency Award.
