= Davidee Kavik =

Canadian Inuk sculptor (1915–1996)

Davidee Kavik (1915–1996) was a Canadian Inuk soapstone carver from Sanikiluaq (also known as the Belcher Islands), Nunavut Territory.

== Biography ==
Kavik was born in Sanikluaq. In 1968, the Lofthouse Galleries in Ottawa staged a solo exhibition of Kavik's work.

Kavik's work is held in several museums worldwide, including the British Museum, the National Gallery of Canada, the University of Michigan Museum of Art, the Winnipeg Art Gallery, and the National Museum of the American Indian. Kavik died in 1996.
