= Deborah Clashin =

Hopi-Tewa Tobacco Clan potter

- Born: 1969 (age 56–57)

Deborah Clashin (born 1969), also known as Debbie Clashin, is a Hopi-Tewa Tobacco Clan potter.

== Artwork ==
Clashen first showed her work in a juried competition at the Museum of Northern Arizona in Flagstaff during their annual Hopi Show. She earned a 1st Place ribbon at that show and feels it was her tribute to her teacher, Dianna Tahbo. She entered a piki bowl in the SWAIA Santa Fe Indian Market juried show in 2015, earning her the 1st Place ribbon for Utilitarian Pottery.

Her work is included in the collections of the National Museum of the American Indian, the Fralin Museum of Art, the Nelson-Atkins Museum of Art, the Maxwell Museum of Anthropology, the Minneapolis Institute of Art and the Seattle Art Museum. Notable awards include the Santa Fe Indian Market Helen Naha Memorial Award for Hopi Pottery.

== Personal life ==
Her parents are Lorena Clashin and Morris Clashin Sr. Among her cousins are Dianna Tahbo, Mark Tahbo, Dorothy Ami, and Larson Goldtooth. She was exposed to pottery making throughout much of her life, but did not learn the craft until 2010 from Dianna Tahbo.

Some of her favorite shapes to make are large jars with small openings and flattened seed pots. Her favorite designs to paint are stylized interpretations of ancient Hopi designs, especially bird elements. Debbie is a traditionalist and continues the tradition of hand coiling with native clay and slips and outdoor firing.
