= Joe Talirunili =

Canadian artist

Joe Talirunili (ca. 1893–1976) was an Inuk printmaker and sculptor, who would sometimes draw. There are two different places listed of where the artist was born, Qugaaluk River camp, Quebec, or 50 kilometers north of Puvirnituq in Nunavik Province, Quebec, at Neahungnik camp Another mystery is when the artist was born and when he died. The Department of Indian and Northern Affairs in Ottawa says he was born in 1893, but the artist claims that 1906 is the correct year, but there is no indication of when the month and day was. The dates of his death are September 13, 1976, or September 11, 1976.

== The migration ==
Joe was brought up with the traditional lifestyle of the Inuit. When he was younger, he spent most of his time with his father hunting in the Kuujjuarapik and Richmond Gulf region. The Inuit move camp and follow the caribou as a part of their hunting lifestyle. When Talirunili was younger, he was in a migration. This migration was a traumatic incident that happened in Joe’s life.

A group of about forty people were traveling to new hunting grounds on an island in Hudson Bay. The crew got into a shipwreck and the ice floe that they were on had broken off the edge of the sea ice. The people had to use the sealskins, rope, and wood from their sleds to make an umiak (a skin boat). They worked against nature’s time of the ice melting; some people did not survive. The boat full of people floated for days before they reached land. This experience influenced and inspired the artist to create sculptures of "The Migration,' which are also called, "Joe Boats."

== Exposure to art ==
Joe was exposed to the non-Inuit lifestyle at an early age because his father worked with the mining prospectors. In the 1950s, the non-Inuit started to settle in Puvirnituq, this gave Talirunili the opportunity to work with them in order to support his family by not only hunting. This also gave him the opportunity to learn about creating art in printmaking, sculpting, and drawing.

== Talirunili's art timeline ==
In the 1950s, Talirunili focused more on sculptures. He carved migration scenes of umiaks, Inuit men and women, hunting scenes, and caribou. After a decade of sculpting, he got into printmaking graphics in the 1960s. In all of Joe’s work, sculptures, prints, and drawings, he tells stories from his traditions, childhood, people’s lives, camp life, hunting scenes, owls, other animals, and his famous "migration" works.

== Puvirnituq Print Shop ==
Joe Talirunili and his cousin, Davidialuk Alasua Ammitu, were among the founding members of the Puvirnituq print shop. In Joe’s lifetime, he made about over seventy prints. His graphics were put into the Puvirnituq annual print collections in the 1960s. In 1978, one of Joe’s sculptures was reproduced on a 1978 Canadian postage stamp.
