= Enook Manomie =

Inuk carver (1941-2006)

Enook Manomie (July 24, 1941 – December 2, 2006) was an Inuk carver.

== Early life and education ==
Manomie, who grew up in Kinngait on Baffin Island, Nunavut, Canada, started carving while in his teens. His father, Manomie Sako, was a well-known carver, and Manomie learned by watching him. His brother Towatogua Sagouk also became an artist.

== Career ==
Manomie worked with soapstone from Baffin Island quarries. He carved using files, small picks and axes, rasps, and sandpaper. Though he was best known for his sculptures, he also created drawings, prints, and jewelry.

Manomie's work is held in several museums worldwide, including the National Gallery of Canada, the Penn Museum, the McMaster Museum of Art, the University of Michigan Museum of Art, the Winnipeg Art Gallery, the University of Lethbridge Art Collection, and the Smith College Museum of Art.

In September 2011, CTV News reported that an Enook Manomie sculpture and two Robert Baffa photographs were stolen from a Public Safety Canada building, though the date of the theft was unclear.

== Personal life ==
His wife, Suzanne Manomie, was from British Columbia and acted as his translator. The couple adopted several Inuit children.
