= Klah Tso =

Navajo painter active in the 1910s in Arizona

- Born: Tłʼatsoh; Arizona, US
- Died: Arizona, US
- Education: Self-taught
- Known for: Painting
- Patrons: Matthew Murphy

Klah Tso (Navajo: Tłʼatsoh) (mid-19th – early 20th century) was a Navajo painter. He is considered a pioneer Navajo easel painter, and was one of several proto-modern Navajo artists.

== Background ==
Klah Tso was also known as Big Lefthanded, Big Lefthanded Chou, or Old Hostin Claw. He should not be confused with Hastiin Klah, the Navajo weaver, or Choh, the Navajo graphic artist. He lived near Tuba City, Arizona, or possibly Indian Wells. He was a traditional singer.

== Artwork ==
From around 1902 to 1915, Klah Tso created equestrian and ceremonial paintings using natural pigments applied with a stick. The Navajo agent and trader, Matthew M. Murphy collected 29 of Klah Tso's sandpaintings, which were believed to be created between 1905 and 1912. The selling of his artwork to Murphy was a major part of what marked Klah Tso's work as proto-modern, as past Navajo artwork was only made for the use of the cultural group.

Klah Tso also adopted a variety of Western materials such as oil, gouache, tempera, and colored pencil. He painted representational, narrative works on brown cotton cloth.

Several of Klah Tso's works are in the collections of the National Anthropological Archives. The Ride portrays a line of Navajo riders following a man with a ceremonial staff. There is no background but the horses are kicking up a cloud of dust on the tan-dyed cotton cloth background. While some of his works are secular in subject matter, many portray Navajo ceremonies.

Jeanne O. Snodgrass wrote that he created, "one of the loveliest known early American Indian paintings" to be seen by non-Natives. His work is also in the Museum of Northern Arizona, Katherine Harvey Collection in Flagstaff, Arizona. Navajo Feather Dance is one of many sandpaintings originally collected by Murphy, and portrays two dancing figures, each with its own ground line showing that each lives within a very specific environment that is theirs alone. The figures in this work have naturalistic proportions which is atypical of traditional Navajo artwork and is yet another sign of a transition to a more modern style.

== See also ==
- List of Native American artists
- Visual arts by indigenous peoples of the Americas
