= Aníbal López =

- Born: Aníbal Asdrúbal López Juarez; April 13, 1964; Guatemala
- Died: September 26, 2014 (aged 50)
- Other name: A-1 53167
- Known for: Performance art, conceptual art, street interventions
- Movement: Conceptual art

Aníbal López (A-1 53167), full name Aníbal Asdrúbal López Juarez (April 13, 1964 – September 26, 2014) was an artist and a native of Guatemala. He began his career creating figurative art influenced by expressionism. He has worked in several media, including acrylic and oil on canvas, photography, and video. In the 1990s he and other Guatemalan artists such as Regina José Galindo began creating art "actions" or live art, a combination of street art, performance art, minimalism, and conceptual art. A-1 53167 is the code name (his Guatemalan ID card number) that Aníbal López has used since 1997 to sign many of his art actions as a way to show how he questions codes of information regarding identity. The effect is to erase an ethnic-specific sense of belonging and perhaps to resist the impulse of art consumers to categorize him in preconceived categories such as indigenous, Mayan, or Guatemalan.

== Actions ==
Aníbal López, or A-1 53167, creates street interventions that combine the rationalist detachment of conceptual art with the political bravado of Latin American guerrilla fighters. In "El Préstamo" ("The Loan"), a gun-toting A-1 53167 staged an armed robbery by attacking an unwitting passer-by. The stolen money was used to fund an exhibition at the "Contexto" art space, thus transforming the victim into an art sponsor and the spectator into an accomplice in the event.

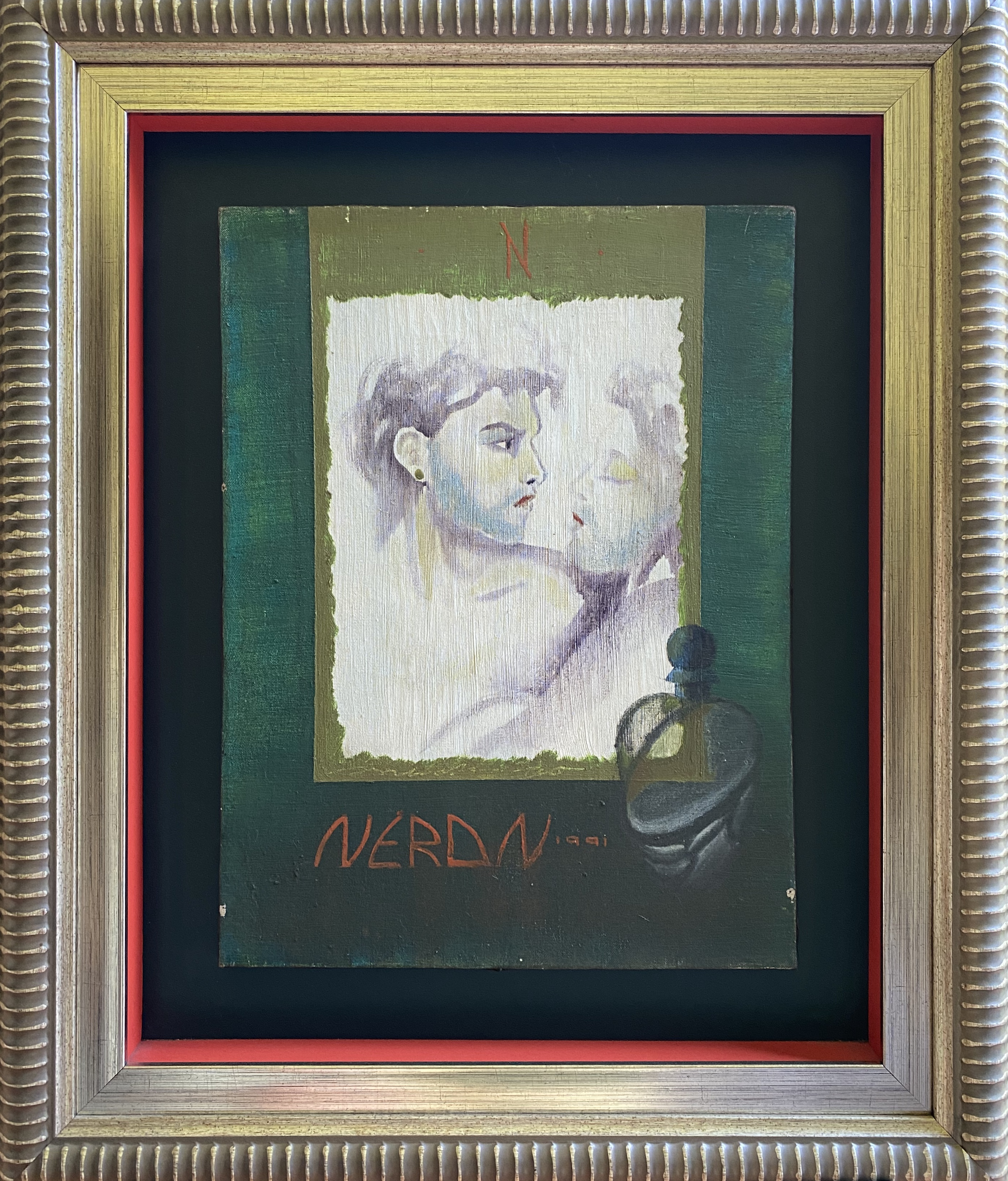
Painting from Aníbal López (A-1 53167). Title: Nerón (Nero). Year: 1991.

In 2001 at the 49th Venice Biennale, he exhibited photographs from a 2000 action in which he scattered the contents of ten large bags of coal across the main boulevard in the center of Guatemala City where a military parade was to take place. The action was intended to remind the military of the crimes and massacres it committed against the country's citizens during the 36-year civil war when more than 200 000 civilians were killed - mostly members of the indigenous Maya Indian community. The military committed human rights abuses including some acts that have been judged to be genocide, as documented by Nobel Peace Prize winner Rigoberta Menchú and others. In an interview with Biennale organizers, the artist stated, "There is a close relationship namely, between the coal, the massacres, and the military, because this material can always be found in the mass graves. In most cases, houses and corpses are burned. I knew that the coal would be cleared away before the parade. I scattered it at about two o'clock in the morning, and at seven o'clock it had already been removed. But there were still traces left. I wanted the military to walk over these traces, and to be able to take photos of the marching army. Since I work with signs that have somehow established themselves, in this case the coal that points to the massacres and the mass graves, I refer with the action to existing problems, without becoming too obvious. It wasn't my intention for the spectators to perceive these signs, but rather that the military itself should notice them."

At the opening of his Berlin exhibition in 2004, he presented another action, this time aimed at the art world. He arranged for six security guards to prevent the public from any contact with the art, the objects, and other people, all under a prohibition sign that said "Do it right".

For "One Ton Of Books Dumped On Reform Avenue," a dump truck stopped in the middle of Guatemala City's Avenida La Reforma, a major artery, dumped its load of used books, and drove away. Local traffic was disrupted and had to maneuver around the pile of seeming rubbish. Pedestrians joined the fracas, moving into the boulevard to pick through the abandoned books, taking anything that interested them. The action was memorialized in a video.

In 2007, Lopez paid smugglers to transport empty boxes into Brazil, resulting in the action, "Sculpture Composed of 500 Boxes of Contraband Transported from Paraguay to Brazil," also memorialized in a video.

In "Roll of 120m x 4m Black Plastic Hanging From The Incienso Bridge" (2003), Lopez attached a long ribbon of plastic to a bridge, where it then floated in the air above a valley.

He is represented by Prometeogallery, Milan, Italy, and The 9.99 Gallery, Guatemala City.

== Awards and exhibitions ==
Aníbal López's awards include:

- 2001 Premio de los Jóvenes Creadores at the 49 Biennale di Venezia, Italy
- X Bienal de Arte Paiz 1996: Primer Premio Glifo de Oro, Salón de Invitados. Italy.
- IX Bienal de Arte Paiz 1994: Premio Unico, Glifo de Oro, Categoría Grabado. Italy.
- Primo Premio “Mención de honor” IX Bienal de Arte Paiz. Italy.

Since 1996 he has held several solo and group exhibitions in Guatemala, Mexico, Italy, Spain, Costa Rica and the United States. Solo exhibitions include:

- 2016. Despacio (Centro de Arte). San José, Costa Rica.
- 2002. Fundación Prometeo para el Arte Contemporáneo. Lucca, Italy.
- "La Distancia Entre dos Puntos." Sol del Rio Arte Contemporáneo. Guatemala City.
- 2000. "Linea de 12,000 Puntos de Largo." Monterrey, México.
- Urban Action on the International Day of Peace. Contexto. Guatemala City.
- Mancha de 55,000 puntos, Intervención en el periódico Siglo XXI. Guatemala City.
- 1999. "Perception." Museum of Modern Art, Guatemala City.
- "Colectiva." Galería Sol del Río, Guatemala City.
- 1997. "100% 50/50>" Galería Sol del Río, Guatemala City.
- The Americas Collection, Guatemala City.
- 1996. The Americas Collection, Miami, Florida.

Other exhibitions include: 2014. La Inquisición en los tiempos modernos, Concepción 41, Antigua Guatemala http://c-41.org/concepcion-41/

- 2006. Start-Milano, Prometeogallery di Ida Pisani. "A-1 53167 COLECTIVA" curated by Marco Scotini
- Prague Biennale 2, Karlin Hall, Prague, Czech Republic
- Hugo. Placentia Contemporary Art with Prometeo Associazione per L'arte contemporanea. Piacenza, Italy
- This Text Does not have Any Meaning. Space 0-27, Guatemala
- Cinco ciegos cortan y reconstruyen un articulo de la constitucion. Foundation Colloquia, Guatemala
- A-1 53167 Anibal Lopez. Prometheus, Chiesa di San Matteo, Lucca, Italy
- The Distance Between two Points. Sol Del Río Arte Contemporánea, Guatemala.
- Performing Localities: Recent Guatemalan Performance Art on Video. May 5, 2009. Screening and talk. Iniva, London, UK.
- 2002. "Last Minute to the End of Eternity." Pianissimo Art Gaeri, Milan, Italy and Placentia Arte, Piacenza, Italy.
- 2001. Suyo Ajeno-Ajeno Suyo, Ex-Teresa Arte Actual, México City.
- Sala de Exposiciones Iglesia de las Francesas. Valladolid, Spain.
- 1999. "Boceto." Fundación Colloquia, Museum of Modern Art, Guatemala City.
- 1998. "1265 KM." Sol de Rio Arte Contemporáneo en el Centro Wifredo Lam. Havana, Cuba.
- "No Name" (Sin titulo). Proyecto de arte Independiente PAI. Guatemala City.
- "JAULA Intervención del Espacio Urbano". Sol de Rio Arte Contemporáneo, Guatemala City.
- 1997. "Salón Internacional de Estandartes" Tijuana, México.
- 1997. Arco97 Madrid, Spain.
- VII Gathering of Contemporary Latin American Writers & Visual Artists. Providence, Rhode Island.
- 1996. Visión del Arte Contemporáneo de Guatemala III 1975 - 1995. Museum of Modern Art. Guatemala City.
- "III Bienal de Pintura del Caribe y Centroamérica." Museum of Modern Art. Santo Domingo, Dominican Republic.

Lectures and talks

- "PERFORMANCE IN CRISIS" October 2 – December 19, 2009, Exit Art, New York City, SYMPOSIUM: Performance and the Politics of Human Rights in Guatemala

== Selected works ==
- One Ton Of Books Dumped On Reform Avenue (Video memorialization)
- Roll of 120m x 4m Black Plastic Hanging From The Incienso Bridge (2003, Video memorialization)
- Export and Import (Exportacion e Importacion). 1999. Mixed media installation. Nine cardboard boxes with oil and acrylic.
- June 30, 2001 (Coal at the military parade, Guatemala City).
- No Name (Sin Titulo).
- A-1 53167.
