= Kavavaow Mannomee =

Inuk printmaker

- Born: September 21, 1958 (age 67); Brandon, Manitoba

Kavavaow Mannomee (also known as Qavavau Manumie) (born September 21, 1958) is an Inuk printmaker who lived and worked in Nunavut.

== Early life ==
He was born in Brandon, Manitoba, when his mother was hospitalized there for tuberculosis. However, the family returned to Cape Dorset soon after, where Mannomee has stayed ever since. His mother Paunichea (1920–1968) and father Davidee were both artists. His brothers Tukiki Manomie and Aqjangajuk Shaa are both sculptors.

== Career ==
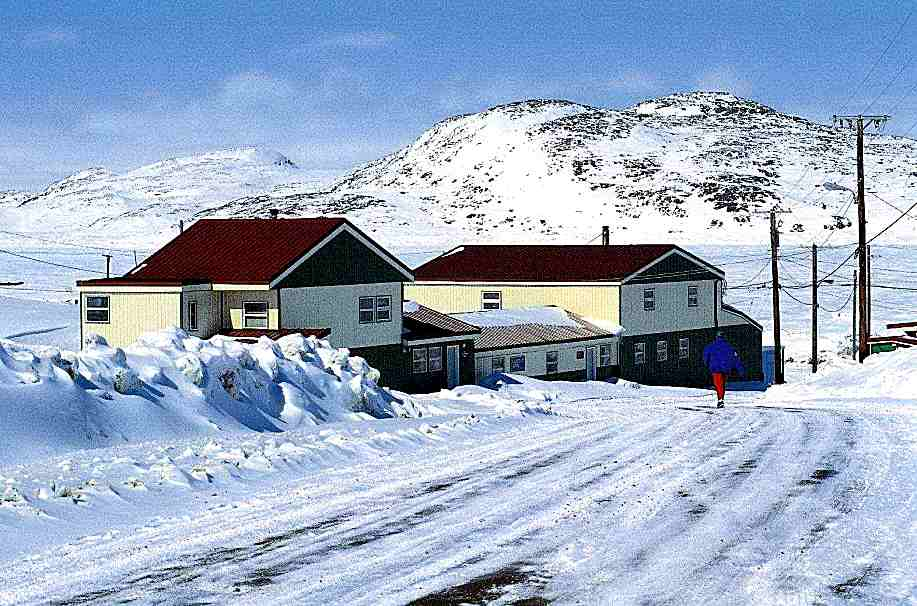
The Kinngait Printshop

Mannomee was involved in the West Baffin Eskimo Co-op and the Kinngait Studios, first making lithographs and later stonecuts. He also worked on graphite drawings. Many of his works featured scenes from everyday life in Inuit culture, as well as Arctic animals and Inuit mythological figures.

His first solo exhibition, featuring his original drawings, happened in Toronto in June 2008. His works are held in several museums, including the Ackland Art Museum, the Canadian Museum of Civilization, the McMichael Canadian Art Collection, the Montreal Museum of Fine Arts, the National Gallery of Canada, the Prince of Wales Northern Heritage Centre, the University of Michigan Museum of Art, the Minneapolis Institute of Arts, and the National Museum of the American Indian.
