= Lorenzo Clayton =

Navajo conceptual artist

- Born: Lorenzo Clayton; 1950 (age 75–76); Tohajiilee Indian Reservation
- Education: BFA Cooper Union, California College of Arts and Crafts
- Known for: Installation, sculpture, conceptual, painting, printmaking

Lorenzo Clayton is a contemporary Navajo sculptor, printmaker, conceptual and installation artist. His artwork is notable for exploring the concepts of spirituality through abstraction.

== Background ==
Lorenzo Clayton was born and raised on the Tohajiilee Indian Reservation. Moving to New York City in 1973 Clayton earned his Bachelor of Fine Arts from Cooper Union in 1977. Between graduation and his teaching career he worked in the printing industry, then, in 1993, he was named assistant professor at Cooper Union and has also served as lithography instructor at Parsons The New School for Design

Clayton is a professor in the printmaking department at Cooper Union.

== Artistic career ==
I believe in the modality of abstraction as the core of human experience and expression. I know that this perception of abstraction is due to an indigenous and culturally-based disposition due to my being one half Navajo.

— Lorenzo Clayton

=== Spiritual exploration ===
Richard's Third Hand #16, 1995

Clayton's artwork is heavily influenced by the search for the spiritual, which he believes is seen throughout Indigenous cultures around the world. Through exploration of the ontological Clayton makes an effort for spiritual nourishment.

In the 1986–1995 series Richard's Third Hand Clayton explored his own spirituality through his love for abstraction and assemblage. The series Come Across (1994–2000) had Clayton blending both Christianity and Navajo spirituality to explore a personal loss of self. This artistic and spiritual exploration shows the journey Clayton made to reconnect with his Navajo identity.

In 2006 Clayton exhibited his "mythistoryquest" installations at the National Museum of the American Indian, New York. The exhibition, titled "Expeditions of the Spirits", featured installation and paperworks, examining the parallels between Christianity and Indigenous religions.

=== Collaborations ===
Collaborations with other artists and creators remain an imperative part of Clayton's career. In 2004 Clayton began working with fellow Cooper Union professor and engineer George Sidebotham on a series called Inner Equations. With a mission to use scientific method to explore irrational thoughts and ideas, the two used Sidebotham's knowledge of mathematical formulae to attempt to explain spiritual growth and relationships. Originally installed at the Jersey City Museum and then the Heard Museum, the installation featured a series of chalkboards mounted on opposing walls, one side of the room is painted white, the other side is painted black, to represent positive and negative. The chalkboards have diagrams and scribblings all over them, reminiscent of the chalkboard works of Cy Twombly. The writings, diagrams, and equations show the benefits of good and bad relationships on a person. Clayton also displayed the journal he kept during the creation of the artwork.

In 2009 Clayton collaborated with filmmaker and sound engineer Jacob Burckhardt to create Current, a 3-minute video installation as part of Wave Hill's exhibition "The Muhheakantuck in Focus". Muhheakantuck is a Lenape word meaning "the river that flows both ways" and was the original name for the Hudson River. The group exhibition featured work by contemporary artists from North and Central America creating artworks about the effects of Henry Hudson's contact with Indigenous people. Burckhardt and Clayton created an interpretation of that literal meaning creating a video displaying the river moving in different directions and flows. It represents metaphorically the ongoing changes and history of the river, "suggesting that the contact between Henry Hudson's Dutch expedition and the Lenape people was a pivotal point in time in the continuum of this force of nature."

== Major collections ==
- Eiteljorg Museum of American Indians and Western Art
- Heard Museum, Phoenix, AZ
- Jane Voorhees Zimmerli Art Museum, New Brunswick, NJ
- Morris Museum, Morristown, NJ
- Museum of Northern Arizona, Flagstaff, AZ
- National Museum of the American Indian, Washington, DC
- Newark Museum, Newark, NJ
- University of Arizona, Tucson, AZ.

== Notable exhibitions ==
- IN/SIGHT, 2010, Chelsea Art Museum
- The Muhheakantuck in Focus, 2009, Wave Hill, New York City
- Relevant: Reflection-Reformation-Revival: Rethinking Contemporary Native American Art, 2009, Nathan Cummings Foundation, New York City
- The Importance of In/Visibility: Recent Work by Native American Artists Living in New York City, 2009, Abrazo Interno Gallery
- Native Voices, 2008, The Brooklyn Campus of Long Island University, Brooklyn, New York
- New Tribe, 2006, National Museum of the American Indian, New York City
- Moment by Moment: Mediation For The Hand, 2006, North Dakota Museum of Art, Grand Forks, North Dakota
- Paumanok, 2006, Stony Brook University, Stony Brook, New York
- Inner Equations, 2006, Heard Museum, Phoenix, Arizona
- Who Stole the TeePee? 2000, National Museum of the American Indian, traveling
- Osaka Triennale, 1994, Japan
- The New Native American Aesthetic, 1984, California State University, Carsan, California
- No Trinkets, No Beads, 1984, Palace of Nations, Geneva, Switzerland

As well as exhibitions at various private galleries and other museums such as the Morris Museum, Museum of the Rockies, Seattle Center, Pratt Manhattan and others.

== Major awards ==
- Eiteljorg Fellowship for Native American Fine Art, 1999, Eiteljorg Museum of American Indians and Western Art
- Pollock-Krasner Foundation Award, 1986, Pollock-Krasner Foundation
- New Jersey State Council on the Arts Grant, 1983, New Jersey State Council on the Arts
- Artist-in-Residence, 1982, Museum of the American Indian

== See also ==
- List of Native American artists
- Visual arts by indigenous peoples of the Americas
