= Charlie Sivuarapik =

Canadian Inuit artisan (1911–1968)

- Born: 1911; Northern Quebec, Canada
- Died: September 26, 1968 (aged 56–57)

Charlie Sivuarapik (Sheeguapik) (1911 – 26 September 1968) was an Inuk sculptor, illustrator and storyteller from Povungnituk in Nunavik, Quebec, Canada who settled in the then newly established village of Puvirnituq in the 1950s where he remained for his life. Due to declining illness, he was unable to hunt to support his family. Sculpting became a way for Sivuarapik to support himself and his family economically until he died of tuberculosis in 1968.

== Biography ==
Charlie Sivuarapik was born in approximately 1911 in northern Quebec, Canada. When he was about 40, he moved to a village that was being newly settled by the Hudson's Bay Company named Puvirnituq (population: 1,692 as of the 2011 census). Sivuarapik was ill with tuberculosis for much of his life, which prevented him from participating in the traditional male role of hunting in his community. In efforts to support his family economically, he turned to stone carving.

Charlie's career was first influenced by James Houston who visited Puvirnituq in 1948 and 1950 to encourage many in the area to begin carving as a means of livelihood. Peter Murdoch, the founder of the Federation des cooperatives du Nouveau-Quebec and the co-manager of the Hudson's Bay Company, and Father André Steinmann, patron of the Puvirnituq Sculptors Society, were also early mentors of Sivuarapik's. They taught him how to evaluate and price Inuit artwork, by promoting an environment of shared critiques among the artists of the Cooperative, pushing them to strive for better quality carvings.

Sivuarapik studied his own anatomy to obtain a more precise understanding of proportion and shape. He first worked with ivory mainly depicting otters, but transitioned to stone human figures with realistic, expressive facial features captured mid-activity after 1953. His carvings grew in size from small, hand held objects to larger pieces of stone, and he often used secondary materials to distinguish hunting objects, such as knives and spears. By 1955, Charlie's sculpture was more dynamic through the complex use of negative space, and his unique portrayal of mythological scenes in a realistic manner. Charlie was also versed in the European style of printmaking. Sivuarapik's excellence at carving allowed him to found the Carvers Association of Puvirnituq, today the Cooperative Association of Puvirnituq, a part of the Federation of Cooperatives of Northern Quebec.

Sivuarapik's success earned him a feature in The Beaver magazine in 1956 written by Peter Murdoch. He was also the subject of Richard Harrington's photo essay published in the 1959 Canadian Geographical Journal. Charlie accompanied Father Steinmann to Cleveland and New York in 1958 to gain revenue for the Cooperative Association of Puvirnituq, successfully returning with $3,000 of prepaid orders. While there, he was featured on the Dave Garroway Show. The pair also travelled to Ottawa, Toronto, Montreal, and Pittsburgh. This trip allowed the revenue for the Povirnituq Cooperative Society to increase from 1968 ($250,000) to 1969 (over $500,000).

Sivuarapik's work is greatly admired because of his use of sulijuk, which is a Nunavamiut term for completeness. Popular Inuit arts academic George Swinton has referred to Sivuarapik as, "the most significant influence in the development of Pov naturalism", based on Swinton's personal experiences with the artist when he travelled north with the Hudson's Bay Company in 1957. Although many of Sivuarapik's works are in museum collections, sculptures for private sale are often available.

His work is held in a variety of museums, including the National Gallery of Canada, the Winnipeg Art Gallery, the Flint Institute of Arts, the Museum of Anthropology at UBC, the University of Michigan Museum of Art, the Montreal Museum of Fine Arts, the Hood Museum of Art, and the Canadian Museum of History.

== Works ==
- Lapland Longspur, c. 1950, black stone, 6.8 x 11.4 x 4.7 cm, National Gallery of Canada, Ottawa, Ontario.
- Snow Bunting, c. 1955, grey stone, 6.7 x 5.8 x 13.4 cm, National Gallery of Canada, Ottawa, Ontario.
- Povungnituk Fish, c. 1967, stone, 7.6 x 25.4 x 11.4 cm, private collection.
- Povungnituk Otter in Trap, c. 1960, stone, 5.1 x 3.2 x 8.9 cm, private collection.
- Hunter and Polar Bear, c. 1960, black mottled stone, ivory, and sinew, 26 x 13 x 5 c, private collection.

== Notable achievements ==
- First Inuk member of the Sculptors Society of Canada
- Founding member and first president (1958–1967) of the Povungnituk Co-operative Society
