= Yvonne Walker Keshick =

Anishinaabe quill artist and basket maker

- Binaakwiikwe
- Born: October 19, 1946 (age 79); Charlevoix, Michigan, U.S.
- Style: porcupine quill boxes and jewelry
- Awards: National Heritage Fellow; 2014; Michigan Heritage Award; 1992

Yvonne Walker Keshick (born October 19, 1946, as Binaakwiikwe, or Falling Leaves Woman) is an Anishinaabe quillwork artist and basket maker.

== Life ==
Keshick was born in 1946 in Charlevoix, Michigan, as an enrolled citizen of the Little Traverse Bay Bands of Odawa Indians. She descended from many generations of Odawa/Ojibwa quillworkers. Her great-aunt Anna Odei'min is one of the best-known WPA Arts and Crafts Project artists.

Keshick became an apprentice of Susan Shagonaby (daughter of Mary Ann Kiogima) in 1969. Shagonaby taught Keshick "from scratch", using cleaned quills fresh off a rotting porcupine. Shagonaby later became the director of the Chief Andrew J. Blackbird House. Keshick began quilling full-time in the 1980s.

She resides in Petoskey, Michigan.

== Work ==
Keshick is a basket-maker and quillworker. She uses porcupine quills, sometimes supplemented by other natural materials such as birch bark and sweetgrass in the decorative articles she creates. It can take a year for her to acquire the quills she needs for a particular work of art. Her designs incorporate traditional elements from her culture as well as animal and plant designs passed down through the generations. She does not dye the quills, relying on subtle differences in their color to provide shadowing effects. She is known for innovating a method of laying the quills to create dynamic textures that give life to her compositions and the animals and birds that she features.

Keshick taught her children, who continue to make quill art. On teaching her art, Keshick has said,

I believe it is truly our responsibility to teach others all of the best things of our culture. Teaching! This is what our elders did for us and it is what we as elders have to do for our young people.

Her work is featured in the collection of the Michigan State University Museum.

== Awards and recognition ==
Keshick received a 1992 Michigan Heritage Award, and was a 2014 National Endowment for the Arts National Heritage Fellow.

In 2006, she was a featured participant in the Smithsonian Folklife Festival's Carriers of Culture Native Weaving Traditions program, and in 2015, she spoke at the Great Lakes Folk Festival.

== Exhibits ==
- Hearts of Our People: Native Women Artists, (2019), Minneapolis Institute of Art, Minneapolis, Minnesota, United States.
- Anishnaabek Art: Gift of the Great Lakes, (2016), Harbor Springs History Museum, Harbor Springs, Michigan
