= Aqjangajuk Shaa =

Inuk artist (1937–2019)

- Born: March 17, 1937
- Died: 2019 (aged 81–82)

Aqjangajuk Shaa (17 March 1937 – 2019) was an Inuk artist. He was born at Shartoweetuk camp near Cape Dorset, Nunavut.

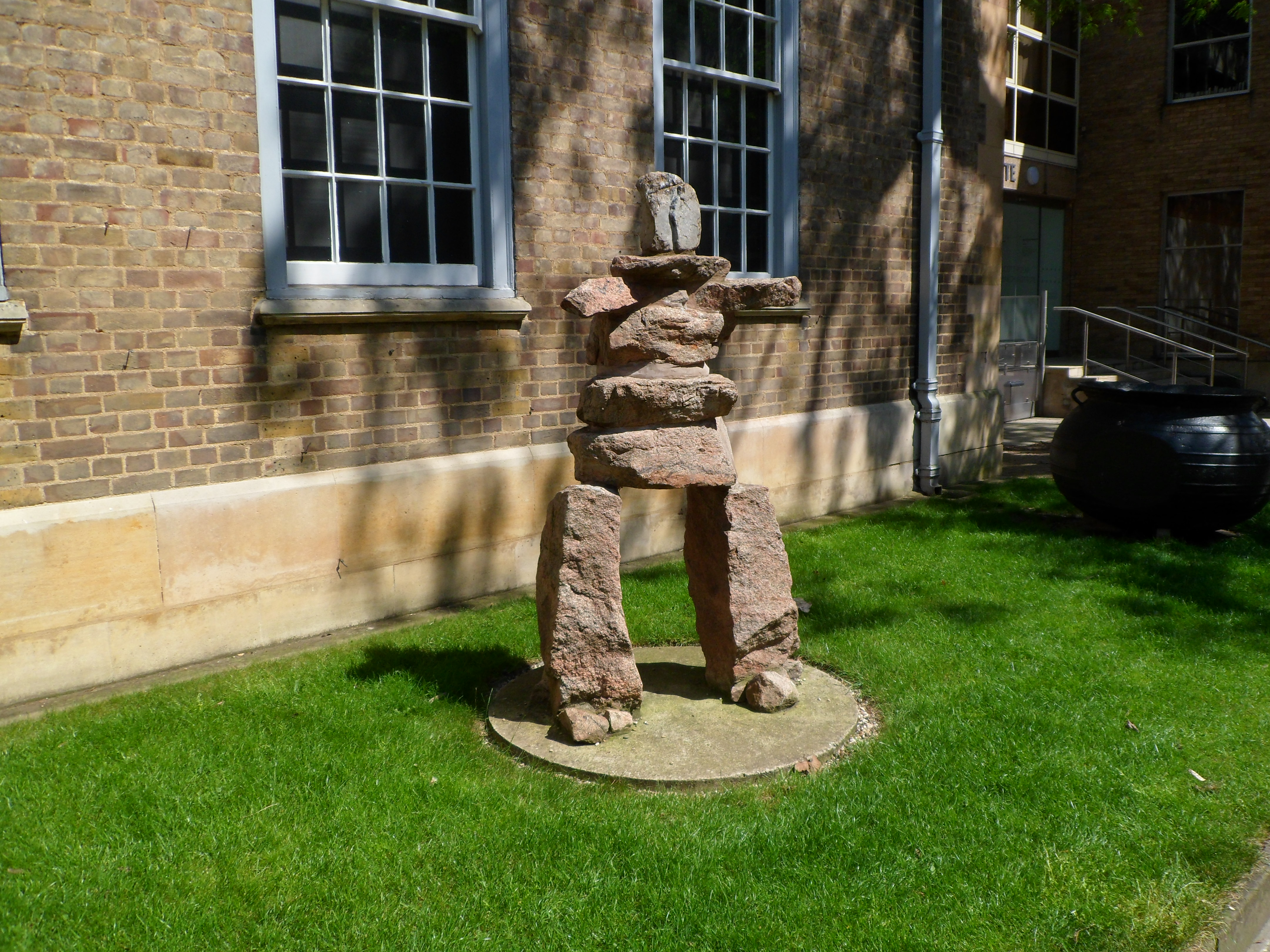
Inukshuk buit by Aqjangajuk Shaa for Charles Gimpel, 1964, Scott Polar Research Institute

He is known for his stone carvings, including a pink granite inuksuk that currently stands at the Scott Polar Research Institute. He also made one print, Wounded Caribou, in 1961. His brother Kavavaow Mannomee (born 1958) is also an artist.

He was elected to the Royal Canadian Academy of Arts in 2003.

His work is held in a variety of museums, including the Portland Art Museum the University of Michigan Museum of Art, the University of Lethbridge Art Collection, the Montreal Museum of Fine Arts, and the Metropolitan Museum of Art.
