= Qikiqtarjuarusiq =

Island in Nunavut, Canada

- Location within Nunavut Location within Canada

Geography
- Location: Hudson Strait
- Coordinates: 62°33′22″N 70°00′22″W
- Archipelago: Arctic Archipelago

Administration
- Canada
- Territory: Nunavut
- Region: Qikiqtaaluk

Demographics
- Population: Uninhabited

Qikiqtarjuarusiq (Inuktitut syllabics: ᕿᑭᖅᑕᕐᔪᐊᕈᓯᖅ) formerly High Bluff Island is an uninhabited island located in the Qikiqtaaluk Region, Nunavut, Canada. It is a Baffin Island offshore island in Hudson Strait. The closest community is Kimmirut, 33.6 km (20.9 mi) away.

Other islands in the immediate vicinity include: Lavoie Island, Wishart Island, Nuvursirpaaraaluk Island, Lee Island, Qaqqannalik, Poodlatee Island, Uugalautiit Island, Black Bluff Island, Aulatsiviit, Ijjurittiak Island, Ivisaat Island, Takijualuk, Juet Island and Qikiqtarjuaq.
