= Anguttuaq =

Island in Nunavut, Canada

- Location within Nunavut Location within Canada

Geography
- Location: Hudson Strait
- Coordinates: 62°41′30″N 069°42′43″W
- Archipelago: Arctic Archipelago

Administration
- Canada
- Territory: Nunavut
- Region: Qikiqtaaluk

Demographics
- Population: Uninhabited

Anguttuaq (ᐊᖑᑦᑐᐊᖅ) formerly Beacon Island is an uninhabited island located in the Qikiqtaaluk Region, Nunavut, Canada. The closest community is Kimmirut, 20.9 km (13.0 mi) away.

Other islands in the immediate vicinity include: Lavoie Island, Wishart Island, Nuvursirpaaraaluk Island, Lee Island, Forder Island, Poodlatee Island, Uugalautiit Island, Black Bluff Island, Aulassivik Island, Ijjurittiak Island, Ivisaat Island, Glasgow Island, Juet Island, and High Bluff Island.

== See also ==
- Beacon Island (Hudson Strait)
- Beacon Island (Ungava Bay)
- Upajjana, formerly Beacon Island
