= Poodlatee Island =

Island in Nunavut, Canada

- Location within Nunavut Location within Canada

Geography
- Location: Hudson Strait
- Coordinates: 62°43′N 69°38′W
- Archipelago: Arctic Archipelago

Administration
- Canada
- Territory: Nunavut
- Region: Qikiqtaaluk

Demographics
- Population: Uninhabited
- Source: Poodlatee Island at Atlas of Canada

Poodlatee Island is an uninhabited island located in Qikiqtaaluk Region, Nunavut, Canada. It is a Baffin Island offshore island in Hudson Strait. The closest community is Kimmirut, 19.9 km (12.4 mi) away.

Other islands in the immediate vicinity include: Lavoie Island, Wishart Island, Black Bluff Island, Lee Island, Forder Island, Nuvursirpaaraaluk Island, Beacon Island, Aulassivik Island, Ijjurittiak Island, Ivisaat Island, Glasgow Island, Juet Island, and Uugalautiit Island.
