= Kinngarjuaq =

Island in Canada

- Location within Nunavut Location within Canada

Geography
- Location: Hudson Strait
- Coordinates: 62°36′28″N 69°30′07″W
- Archipelago: Arctic Archipelago

Administration
- Canada
- Territory: Nunavut
- Region: Qikiqtaaluk

Demographics
- Population: Uninhabited

Kinngarjuaq (Inuktitut syllabics: ᑭᙵᕐᔪᐊᖅ) formerly Juet Island is an uninhabited island located in the Qikiqtaaluk Region, Nunavut, Canada. It is a Baffin Island offshore island in Hudson Strait. The closest community is Kimmirut, 35.2 km (21.9 mi) away.

Other islands in the immediate vicinity include: Lavoie Island, Wishart Island, Nuvursirpaaraaluk Island, Lee Island, Qaqqannalik, Poodlatee Island, Anguttuaq, Black Bluff Island, Aulatsiviit, Ijjuriktuq, Ivvitsa, Takijualuk, and Uugalautiit Island. Eight pre-Dorset or early Dorset culture sites were excavated on the island and a nearby area on Baffin Island.
