= Ijjuriktuq =

Island in Nunavut, Canada

- Location within Nunavut Location within Canada

Geography
- Location: Hudson Strait
- Coordinates: 62°45′51″N 69°43′57″W
- Archipelago: Arctic Archipelago

Administration
- Canada
- Territory: Nunavut
- Region: Qikiqtaaluk

Demographics
- Population: Uninhabited
- Source: Ijjurittiak Island at Atlas of Canada

Ijjuriktuq (ᐃᔾᔪᕆᒃᑐᖅ) formerly Ijjurittiak Island is an uninhabited island in the Qikiqtaaluk Region, Nunavut, Canada. It is a Baffin Island offshore island in Hudson Strait. The closest community is Kimmirut, 12 km (7.5 mi) away.

Other islands in the immediate vicinity include: Lavoie Island, Wishart Island, Nuvursirpaaraaluk Island, Lee Island, Qaqqannalik, Poodlatee Island, Anguttuaq, Black Bluff Island, Aulatsiviit, Ivisaat Island, Takijualuk, Juet Island, and Uugalautiit Island.
