= Takijualuk =

Island in Nunavut, Canada

- Location within Nunavut Location within Canada

Geography
- Location: Hudson Strait
- Coordinates: 62°46′15″N 69°46′28″W
- Archipelago: Arctic Archipelago

Administration
- Canada
- Territory: Nunavut
- Region: Qikiqtaaluk

Demographics
- Population: Uninhabited

Takijualuk (Inuktitut syllabics: ᑕᑭᔪᐊᓗᒃ) formerly Glasgow Island is an uninhabited island located in the Qikiqtaaluk Region, Nunavut, Canada. It is a Baffin Island offshore island in the Hudson Strait. The closest community is Kimmirut, 10.5 km (6.5 mi) away.

Other islands in the immediate vicinity include: Lavoie Island, Wishart Island, Nuvursirpaaraaluk Island, Lee Island, Qaqqannalik, Poodlatee Island, Anguttuaq, Black Bluff Island, Aulatsiviit, Ijjurittiak Island, Ivisaat Island, Juet Island, and Uugalautiit Island.
