= Aulatsiviit =

Island in Nunavut, Canada

- Location within Nunavut Location within Canada

Geography
- Location: Hudson Strait
- Coordinates: 62°43′18″N 069°44′58″W
- Archipelago: Arctic Archipelago

Administration
- Canada
- Territory: Nunavut
- Region: Qikiqtaaluk

Demographics
- Population: Uninhabited

Aulatsiviit (Inuktitut syllabics: ᐊᐅᓚᑦᓯᕖᑦ) formerly Aulassivik Island is an uninhabited island located in the Qikiqtaaluk Region, Nunavut, Canada. It is a Baffin Island offshore island in Hudson Strait. The closest community is Kimmirut, 16.6 km (10.3 mi) away.

Other islands in the immediate vicinity include: Lavoie Island, Wishart Island, Nuvursirpaaraaluk Island, Lee Island, Forder Island, Poodlatee Island, Beacon Island, Black Bluff Island, Ijjurittiak Island, Ivisaat Island, Glasgow Island, Juet Island, and Uugalautiit Island.
