= Nuvuktiqpaaraaluk =

Island in Nunavut, Canada

- Location within Nunavut Location within Canada

Geography
- Location: Hudson Strait
- Coordinates: 62°42′57″N 69°43′44″W
- Archipelago: Arctic Archipelago

Administration
- Canada
- Territory: Nunavut
- Region: Qikiqtaaluk

Demographics
- Population: Uninhabited
- Source: Nuvursirpaaraaluk Island at Atlas of Canada

Nuvuktiqpaaraaluk (Inuktitut syllabics: ᓄᕗᒃᑎᖅᐹᕌᓗᒃ) formerly Nuvursirpaaraaluk Island is an uninhabited island located in the Qikiqtaaluk Region, Nunavut, Canada. It is a Baffin Island offshore island in Hudson Strait. The closest community is Kimmirut, 17 km (11 mi) away.

Other islands in the immediate vicinity include: Lavoie Island, Wishart Island, Black Bluff Island, Kaavvijjuaq, Qaqqannalik, Poodlatee Island, Anguttuaq, Aulatsiviit, Ijjuriktuq, Ivvitsa, Takijualuk, Kinngarjuaq, and Uugalautiit Island.
