= Kangiqtualujjuaq =

Inlet in Nunavut, Canada

- Location within Nunavut
- Coordinates: 62°27′21″N 68°48′58″W
- Type: Inlet

Kangiqtualujjuaq (Inuktitut syllabicsᑲᖏᖅᑐᐊᓗᔾᔪᐊᖅ formerly Barrier Inlet is a body of water in the Qikiqtaaluk Region of Nunavut, Canada. It lies in western Hudson Strait, forming a wedge into Meta Incognita Peninsula on Baffin Island and the western slopes of the Everett Mountains. Reversing Falls lie near the mouth of the inlet. Iqaluit Kangiqtunga, previously Shaftesbury Inlet, is to the northwest, while Qavarusiqtuuq is to the southeast
