= Iqaluit Kangiqtunga =

Inlet in Nunavut, Canada

- Location in Nunavut
- Location: Baffin Island, Nunavut
- Coordinates: 62°35′09″N 069°16′58″W
- Type: Inlet
- Ocean/sea sources: Hudson Strait
- Basin countries: Canada

Iqaluit Kangiqtunga (Inuktitut syllabics: ᐃᖃᓗᐃᑦ ᑲᖏᖅᑐᖓ) formerly Shaftesbury Inlet is a body of water in the Qikiqtaaluk Region of Nunavut, Canada. It lies in western Hudson Strait, forming a wedge into Baffin Island's Meta Incognita Peninsula. The Inuit community of Kimmirut is to the northwest, while Kangiqtualujjuaq is to the southeast.
