= Upirngiviaaluk =

Island in Nunavut, Canada

- Location within Nunavut Location within Canada

Geography
- Location: Hudson Strait
- Coordinates: 62°48′32″N 71°04′52″W
- Archipelago: Arctic Archipelago

Administration
- Canada
- Territory: Nunavut
- Region: Qikiqtaaluk

Demographics
- Population: Uninhabited

Upirngiviaaluk (Inuktitut: ᐅᐱᕐᖏᕕᐋᓗᒃ) formerly Emma Island is an uninhabited island located in the Qikiqtaaluk Region, Nunavut, Canada. It is a Baffin Island offshore island in Hudson Strait. The closest community is Kimmirut.

Other islands in the immediate vicinity include Qikiqtarjuaq and Rabbit Island.
