= Soper =

Soper is an occupational surname for a soaper.

It may refer to:

== People ==
- Daniel E. Soper (1843–1923), American politician
- Donald Soper, Baron Soper (1903–1998), British Methodist minister, socialist and pacifist
- Fred E. Soper (1854–1930), American politician
- George Soper (1870–1948), American sanitation engineer
- George Soper (illustrator) (1870–1942), British illustrator and etcher
- John Harris Soper (1846–1944), marshall of the Kingdom of Hawaii
- Kate Soper (born 1943), British philosopher
- Kate Soper (composer) (born 1981), American composer
- Lesley Soper (born 1954), New Zealand politician
- Matt Soper, American politician
- Poppy Soper (born 2002), Welsh association football player
- Steve Soper (born 1951), British racing driver
- Tony Soper (born 1929), British naturalist, author and broadcaster
- J. Dewey Soper (1893–1982), Canadian explorer/ornithologist

== Places ==
- Soper, Burkina Faso
- Soper, Michigan, ghost town
- Soper, Oklahoma, US
- Isulijarniq Migratory Bird Sanctuary, Baffin Island, Nunavut, Canada
- Soper Lake, Baffin Island, Nunavut, Canada
- Soper River, Baffin Island, Nunavut, Canada
- Soperton, a small town in Leeds Lansdowne Ontario, Canada

== Other ==
- Soper Frauds redirects to Michigan relics, archaeological fakes in Michigan
