= High Bluff =

High Bluff could refer to:

- High Bluff, Alabama, U.S., an unincorporated community
- Qikiqtarjuarusiq, an island in Nunavut, Canada, also known as "High Bluff Island"
- High Bluff Island (Lake Ontario), an island in Ontario, Canada
- High Bluff, Manitoba, an unincorporated rural community in Manitoba, Canada
