= Qavarusiqtuuq =

Inlet in Nunavut, Canada

- Coordinates: 62°21′18″N 68°41′26″W
- Type: Inlet

Qavarusiqtuuq (ᖃᕙᕈᓯᖅᑑᖅ) formerly Balcom Inlet is a body of water in Nunavut's Qikiqtaaluk Region. It lies in western Hudson Strait, forming a wedge into Baffin Island's Meta Incognita Peninsula and the western slopes of the Everett Mountains.
