= Nuvursiit Islands =

Island group in Nunavut, Canada

Nuvursiit Islands (unofficial)
- Location within Nunavut Location within Canada

Geography
- Location: Hudson Strait
- Coordinates: 62°43′30″N 69°30′20″W

Administration
- Canada
- Territory: Nunavut
- Region: Qikiqtaaluk

Demographics
- Population: Uninhabited
- Source: Nuvursiit Islands at Atlas of Canada

The unofficially named Nuvursiit Islands form part of Baffin Island's offshore islands within Hudson Strait. They are located southeast of Kimmirut. The islands are part of the Qikiqtaaluk Region, in the Canadian territory of Nunavut.
