= Sheer Islands =

Island group in Nunavut, Canada

- Location within Nunavut Location within Canada

Geography
- Location: Hudson Strait
- Coordinates: 62°42′N 69°35′W
- Archipelago: Arctic Archipelago

Administration
- Canada
- Territory: Nunavut
- Region: Qikiqtaaluk

Demographics
- Population: Uninhabited

The Sheer Islands are Canadian arctic islands that are located in Qikiqtaaluk Region, Nunavut, Canada. They are a Baffin Island offshore island group in Hudson Strait. The islands are situated approximately 1 mi (1.6 km) north of Cape Tanfield and form part of the north side of Itivirk Bay.

The group consists of:

- Forder Island, at the northern entrance to Itivirk Bay
- Lee Island, northeast of Forder Island and joined to it at low tide
- Lavoie Island, in the northeast
- Wishart Island, in the northeast.

Kimmirut, Nunavut, an Inuit hamlet, is about 23.2 mi (37.3 km) to the northwest.
