= Inuit printmaking =

Medium of Inuit art

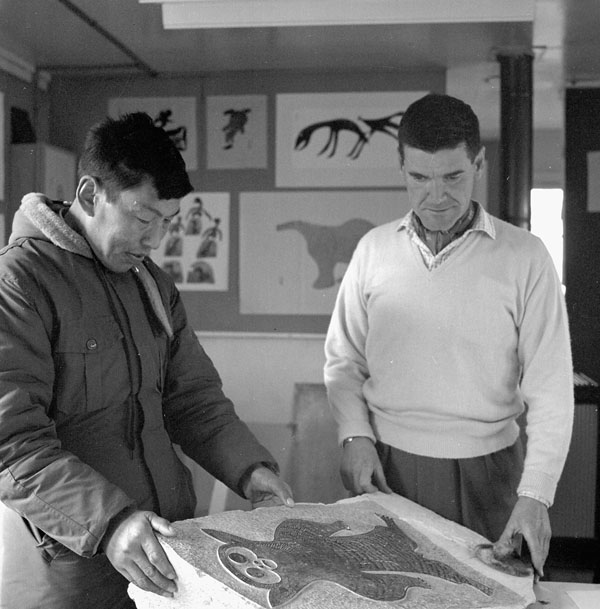
James Houston and Pauta Saila examining a stone-cut

Printmaking by Inuit artists involves techniques such as stone block printing and stencils. Inuit printmaking (Inuktitut: titirtugait) originated at the West Baffin Eskimo Cooperative in 1959.

== Subject matter ==
Figures of animals and hunters, family scenes, and traditional beliefs or mythological imagery are popular. Some artists have adopted a polished style rooted in naturalism. Other artists, such as John Pangnark, have developed a style that is highly abstract.

== History ==
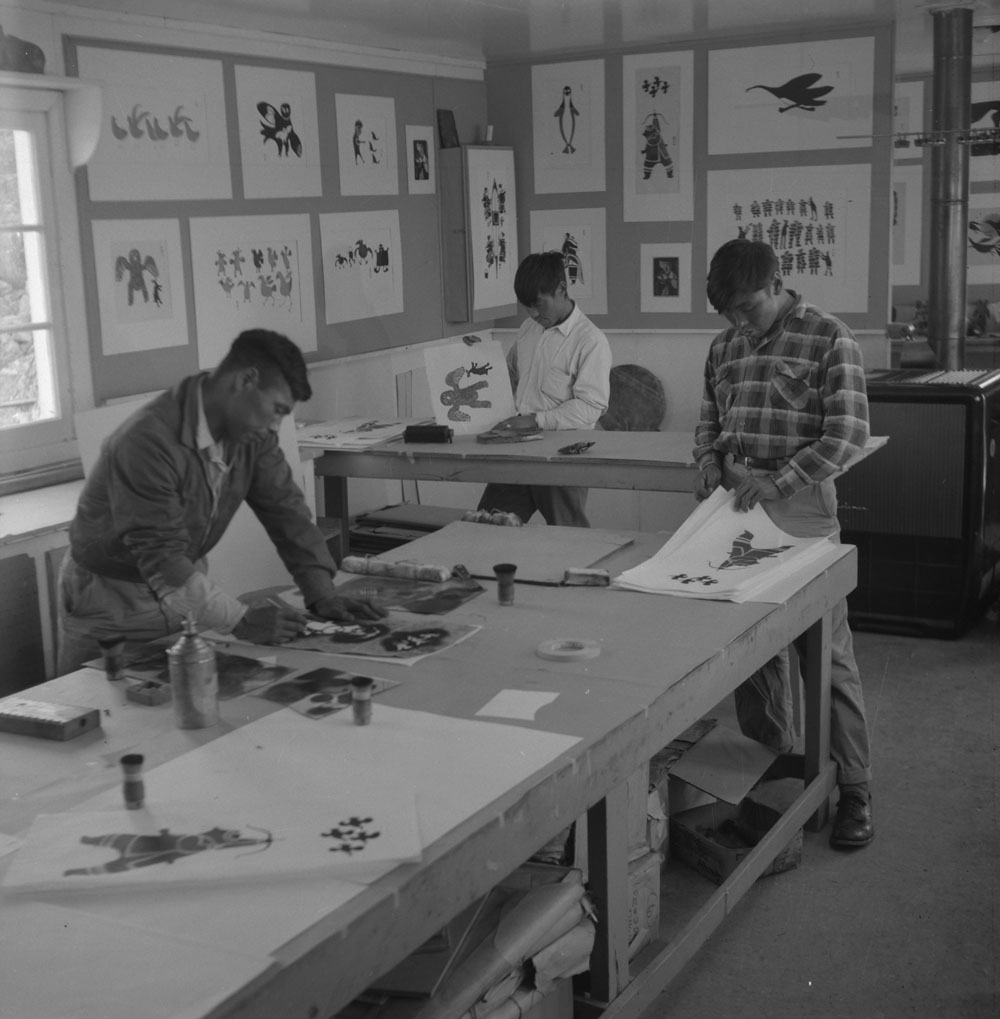
The Kinngait print shop in September 1960.

Printmaking originates at the West Baffin Eskimo Cooperative in the late 1950s.

James Archibald Houston, who had helped attract the attention of the Canadian Handicrafts Guild to Inuit carving in the late 1940s, travelled to Kinngait (then called Cape Dorset) on Baffin Island in 1951. The idea of a printmaking program developed from a winter 1957 conversation between Houston and Osuitok Ipeelee. As Houston recalled:

Osuitok Ipeelee sat near me one evening studying the sailor-head trademarks on a number of identical cigarette packages. He...stated that it must have been very tiresome...to sit painting every one of the small heads on the small packages with the exact sameness...

My explanation was far from successful...partly because I was starting to wonder whether this could have any practical application in Inuit terms.

Looking around to find some way to demonstrate printing, I saw an ivory walrus tusk that Osuitok had recently engraved...

Taking an old tin of writing ink... with my finger I dipped into the black residue and smoothed it over the tusk. I laid a piece of toilet paper on the inked surface and rubbed the top lightly, then quickly stripped the paper from the tusk. I saw that by mere good fortune, I had pulled a fairly good negative of Osuitok's incised design.

"We could do that," he said, with the instant decisiveness of a hunter. And so we did.

The following year, in October 1958, Houston set off to Japan to learn Japanese woodblock printing. From November 1958 to late January 1959, he studied with Un'ichi Hiratsuka. Houston returned in the spring of 1959 and shared what he had learned, and an array of mid-20th century Japanese woodblock prints. This formed the basis for the printing program.

The first Cape Dorset collection of prints was published in 1960. It spread, with Puvirnituq publishing a partial collection in 1962 and a full one in 1964. Ulukhaktok began publishing a collection in 1965, Baker Lake in 1970, and Pangnirtung in 1973.

== Draftsperson and printmaker ==
The final print is a collaboration between the artist, who drafts the image, and the printmaker. The printer makes some artistic decisions regarding the final product. For example, if the original drawing has a lot of thin lines or intricacies, the printer/carver must alter the drawing in order to make it possible to carve. Specific aspects of the drawing may be altered in order to fit. In one instance the neck of a duck had to be shortened, in another only a portion of the artist's original drawing was selected for reproduction. For example:

The Legend of Lumiuk (1960)

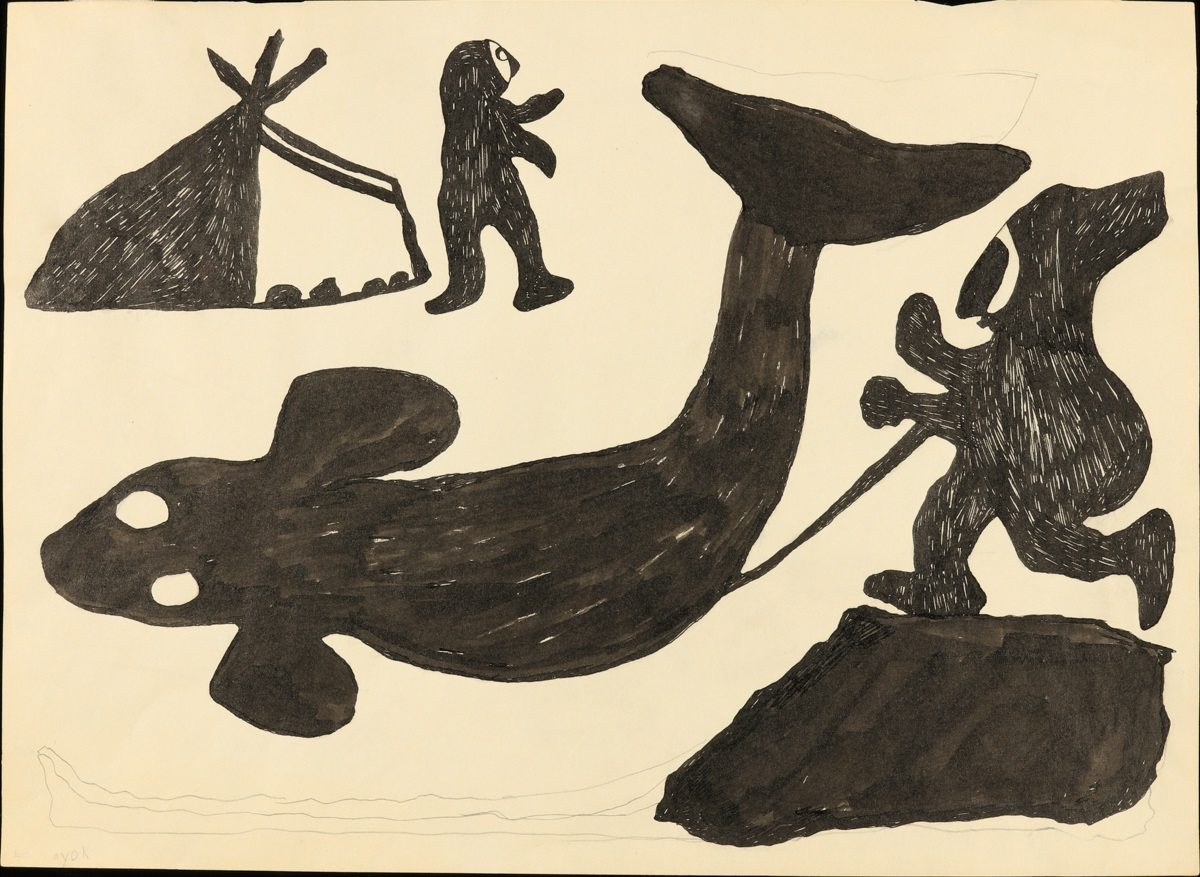
Drawing by Kiakshuk

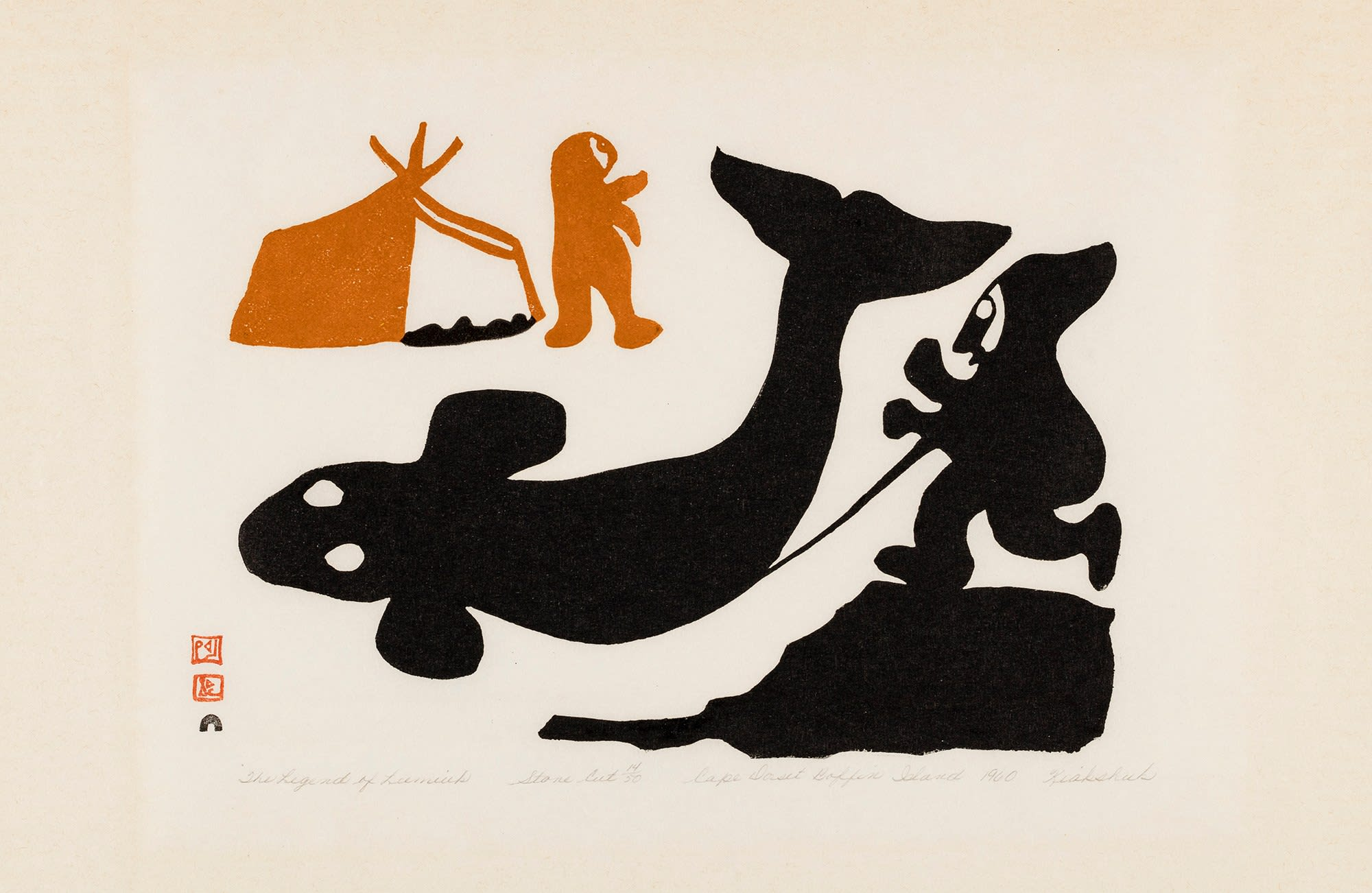
Print by Iyola Kingwatsiak

Inherited from the Japanese tradition, prints are stamped with a chop. Prints are typically stamped with three chops: one for each of the two contributors, and one for the studio where it was made. For example:

draftsperson	ᐳᑐᒍ	Joseph Pootoogook
printmaker	ᓗᑕ	Lukta Qiatsuk
studio	igloo icon	Kinngait Studios

== Techniques ==
=== Block printing ===
These images show the process of Lukta Qiatsuk making a stonecut block print in 1960.

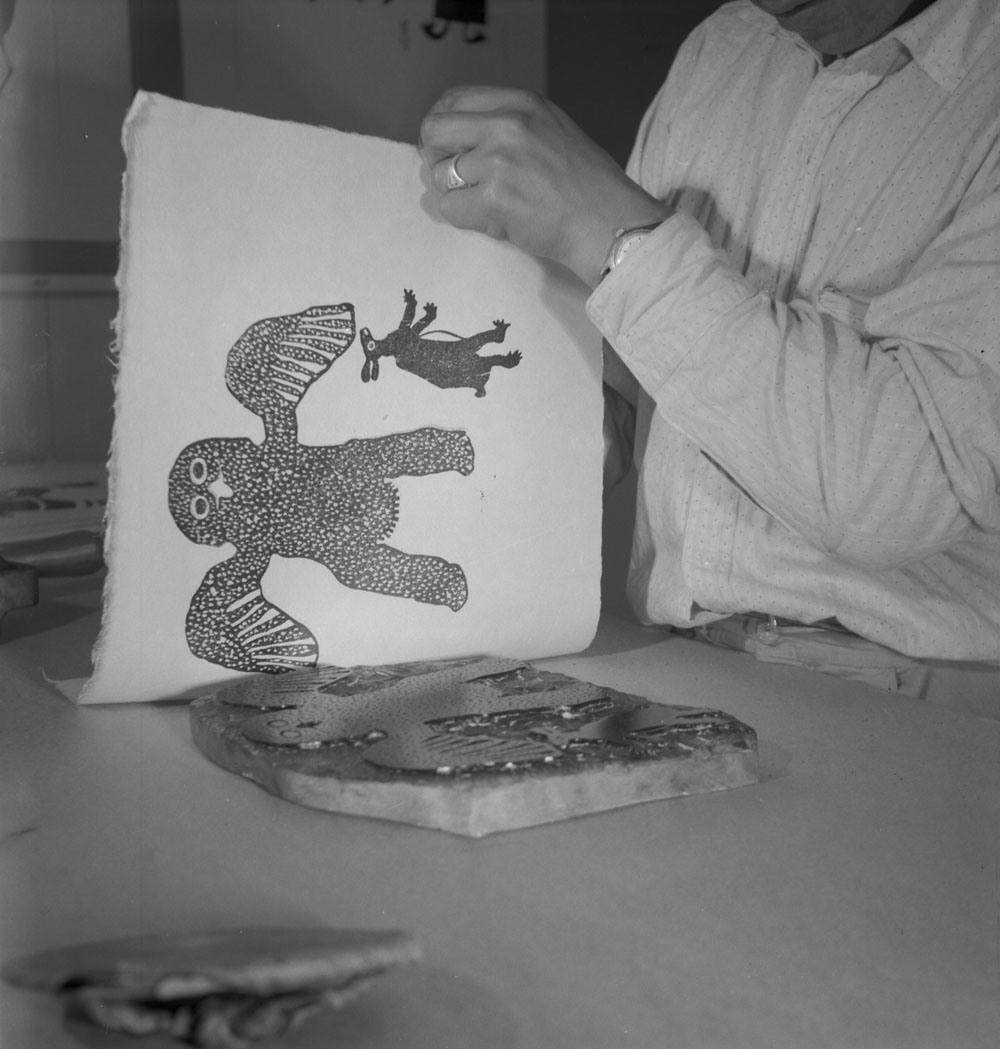

=== Stencils ===
Stencils are another technique that creates images similar to block prints. The two are sometimes used in conjunction for a single piece. Stencil artwork is often advertised as "sealskin stencils", but in fact rarely uses sealskin. Actual sealskin functions poorly as a stencil.

== Materials ==
Japanese printing used wooden blocks, but wood is not very available in the Artic. Stone became the material of choice, as it was readily available, and the first generation of printmakers were already experienced at carving it. Initially serpentine and other soft stone was used, before switching to slate in the 1990s. Linocuts, a more common material globally, are also used.

Some Inuit artists briefly experimented with printing on textiles in the 1950s and 1960s.

== Exhibitions ==
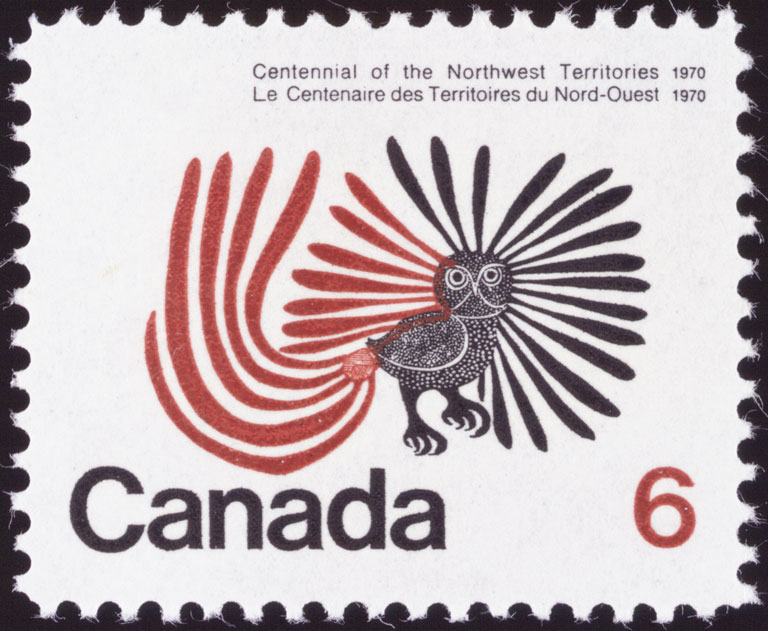

Kenojuak Ashevak's 1960 print "The Enchanted Owl" was made into a Canadian postage stamp in 1970. This made it the single most recognizable Inuit print.

From 2018 to 2019, the University of Michigan Museum of Art exhibited Inuit block prints, in an exhibitions called The Power Family Program for Inuit Art: Tillirnanngittuq (curated by Marion "Mame" Jackson, in collaboration with Pat Feheley). Tillirnannqittuq means "unexpected" in Inuktitut, and the show featured Kenojuak Ashevak, Lucy Qinnuayuak, Niviaksiak, Osuitok Ipeelee, Kananginak Pootoogook, and Johnny Inukpuk.

== Gallery ==
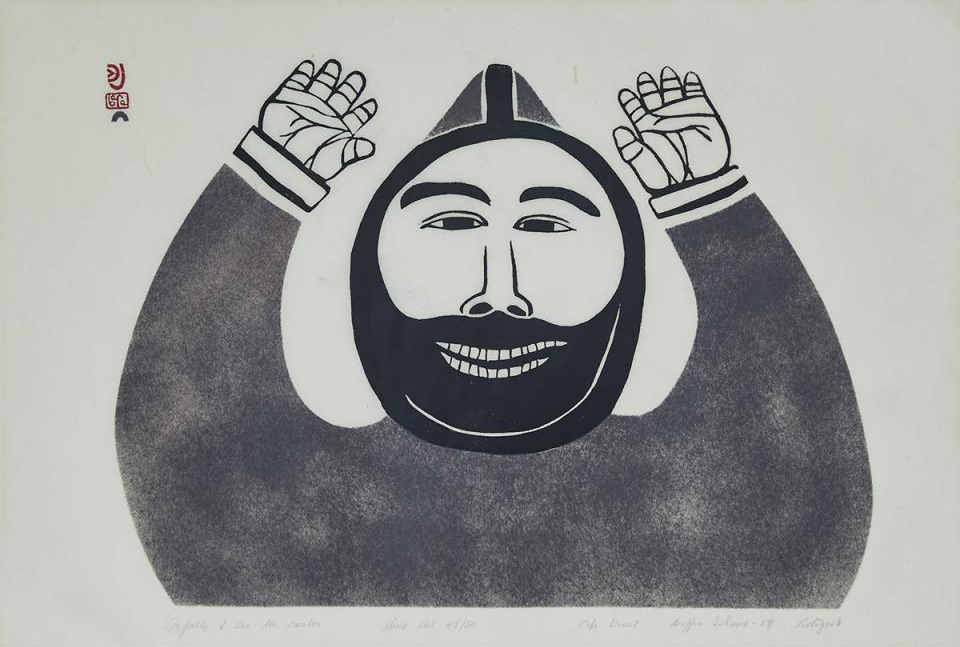
Joyfully I See Ten Caribou (1959) by Josephie Pootoogook & Kananginak Pootoogook, stonecut print

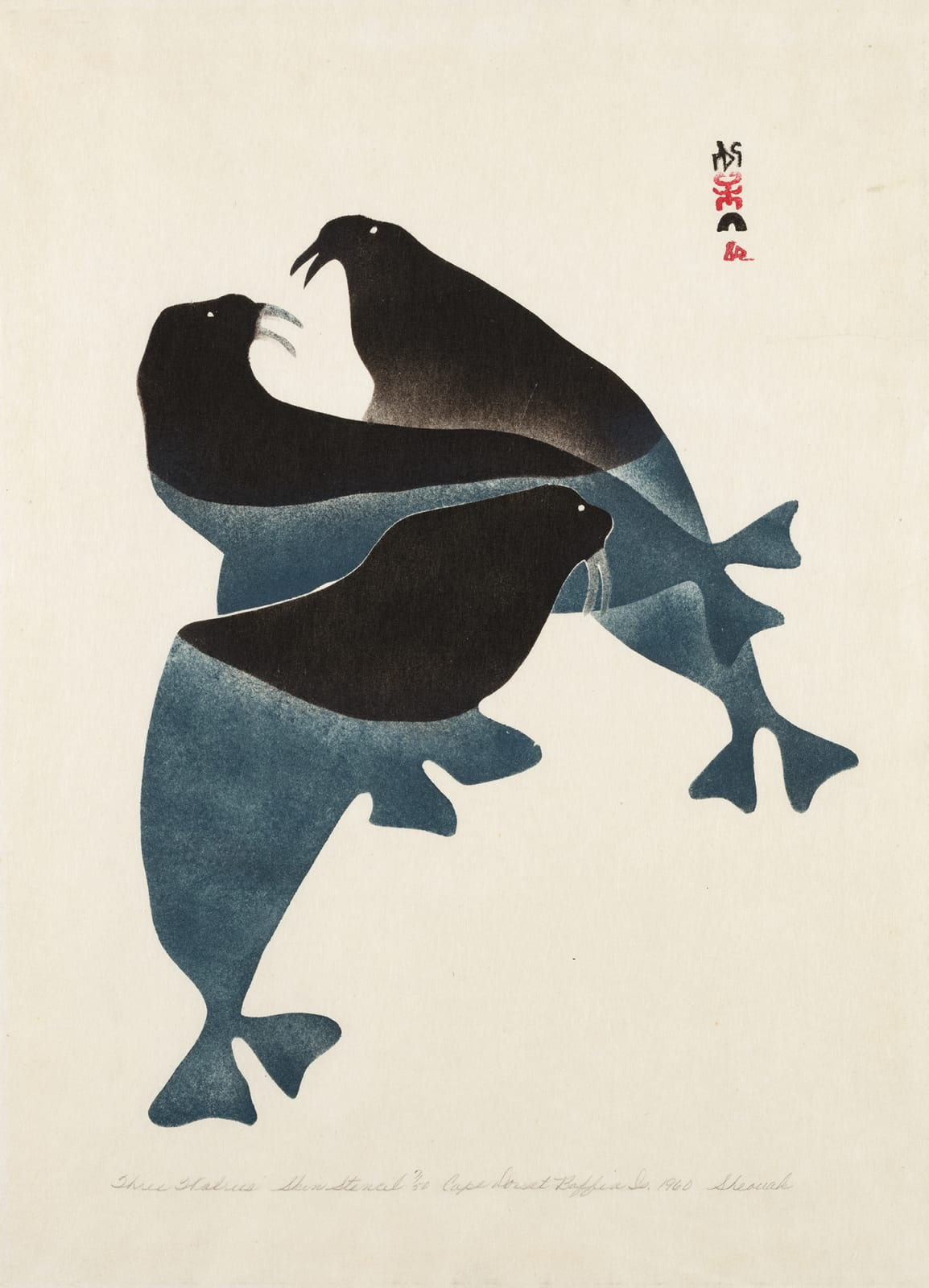
Three Walrus (1960) by Sheouak Petaulassie & Iyola Kingwatsiak, stencil print

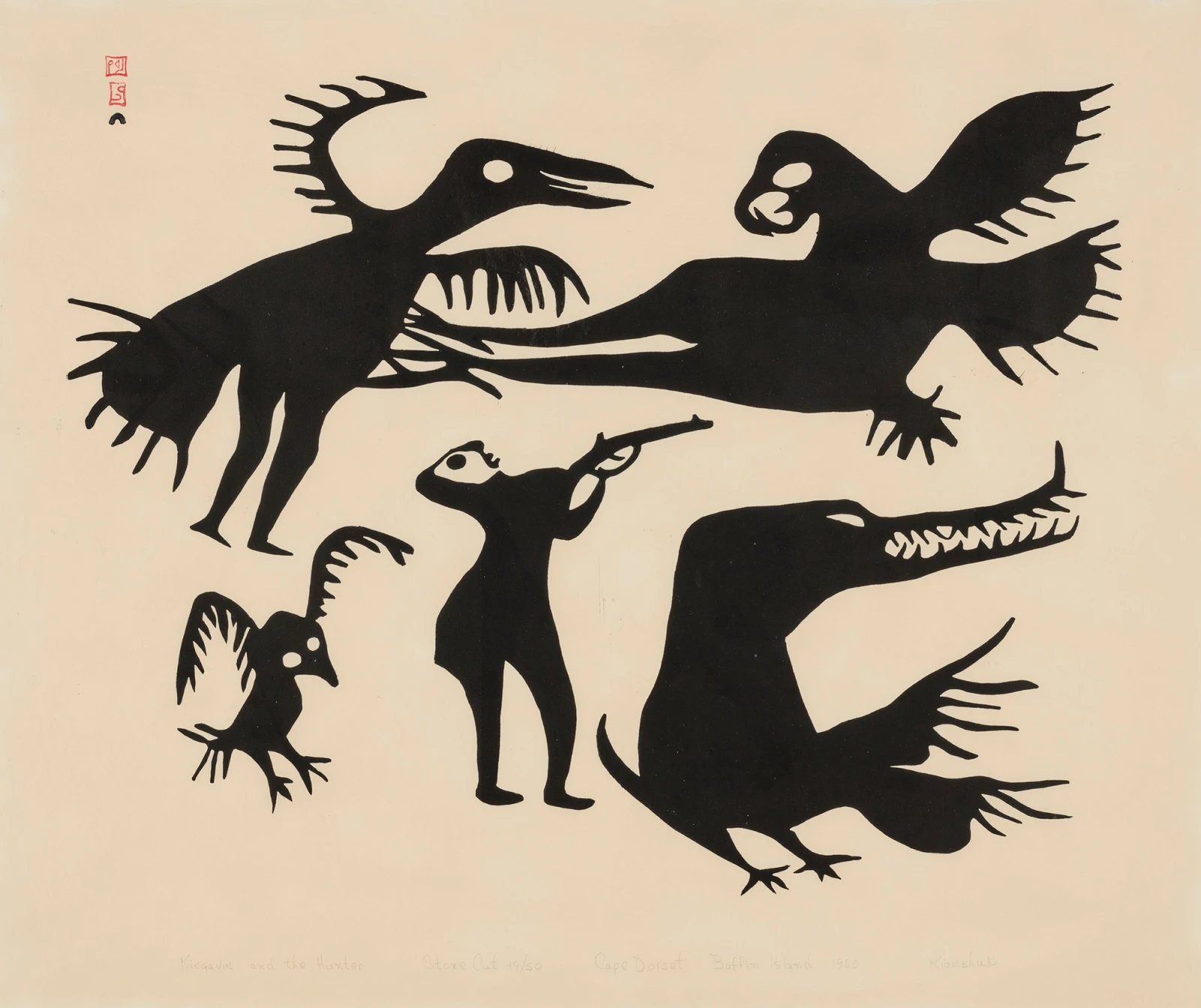
Kikgavik and the Hunter (1960) by Kiakshuk & Lukta Qiatsuk, stonecut print

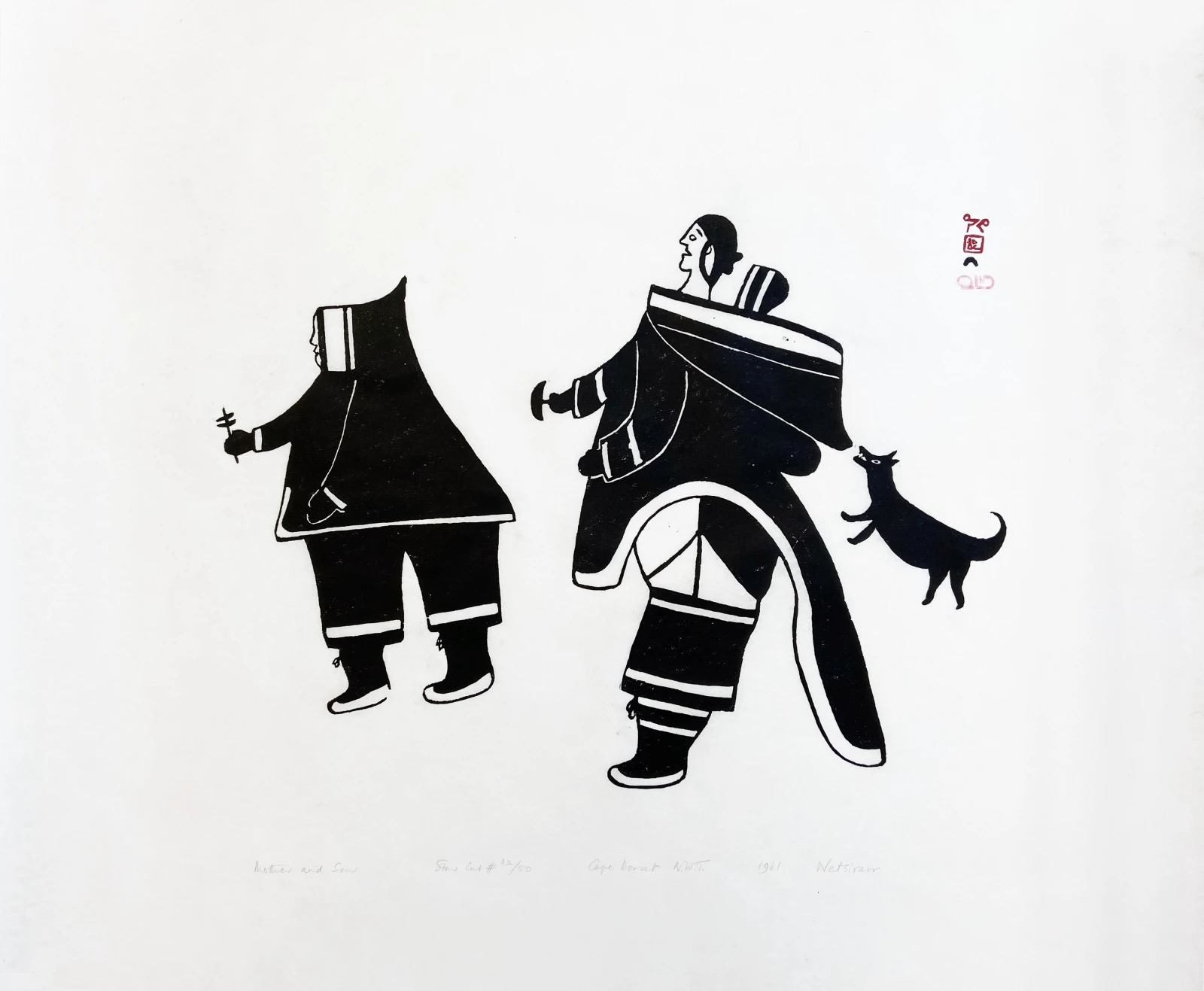
Mother and Son (1961) by Natsivaar & Iyola Kingwatsiak, stonecut print

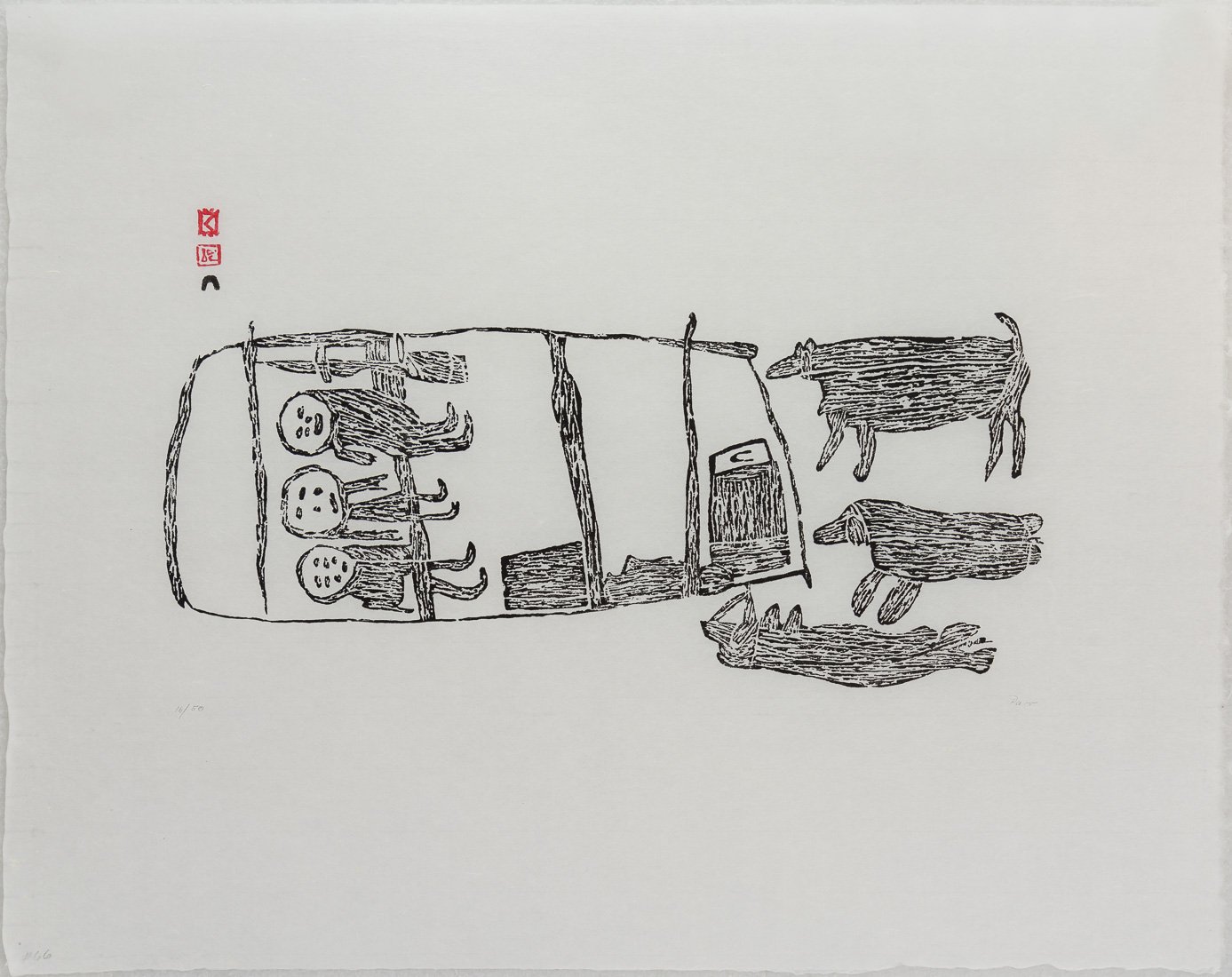
Day's End (1962) by Parr & Iyola Kingwatsiak, stonecut print
