= Iyola Kingwatsiak =

Inuk carver and printmaker (1933-2000)

- Born: August 3, 1933; Kinngait, Baffin Island
- Died: September 4, 2000 (aged 67)

Iyola Kingwatsiak (August 3, 1933 – September 4 2000) was an Inuk visual artist from Kinngait.

== Early life ==
He was born on August 3, 1933, in Kinngait (Cape Dorset) in the Qikiqtaaluk Region (Baffin Island). Many of his family members were also artists, including his sister Tye Adla (1936–1990), his sister Keeleemeeoomee Samualie (1919–1983), his sister Anna Kingwatsiak (1911–1971), and his brother Mikigak Kingwatsiak.

== Career ==
Kingwatsiak first worked as a stone carver, then later became well known for his printmaking. His artwork often featured Arctic animals (including birds, rabbits, walruses, whales, and bears). He worked alongside artists Osuitok Ipeelee, Kananginak Pootoogook, Lukta Qiatsuk, and Eegyvudluk Pootoogook.

His work is held in a variety of museums, including the National Gallery of Canada, the National Museum of the American Indian, the Hood Museum of Art, the University Art Gallery at the University of Pittsburgh, and the University of Michigan Museum of Art.

In 1992, he attended the Conference on Inuit Art held at the McMichael Canadian Art Collection in Kleinburg, Ontario. Later, he said of the trip, "I enjoyed being there, but the problem was that we sat there like pieces of art in a showcase display. The non-Inuit at the conference spoke as much as they pleased about their own lives and how they lived like Inuit. But they never gave us a chance to speak or asked us questions about our work. The white people dominated as usual. . . .We work hard to make a living with our art and nobody asked us to talk about how we make our carvings and prints and what kind of tools and other things we use."
