= Beacon Island (Hudson Strait) =

Canadian island

Geography
- Location: Hudson Strait
- Coordinates: 64°12′N 76°27′W
- Archipelago: Arctic Archipelago
- Highest elevation: 208 m (682 ft)

Administration
- Canada
- Territory: Nunavut
- Region: Qikiqtaaluk

Demographics
- Ethnic groups: Inuit

Beacon Island is a small uninhabited island in Hudson Strait, Qikiqtaaluk Region, Nunavut, Canada. It lies just east of Dorset Island and the community of Cape Dorset. The SS Nascopie was wrecked on a nearby reef.

== See also ==
- Anguttuaq, formerly Beacon Island
- Beacon Island (Ungava Bay)
- Upajjana, formerly Beacon Island
