= Qikiqtarjuaq (Hudson Strait) =

Canadian island

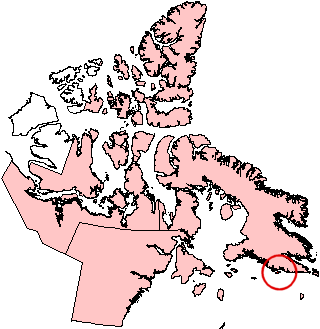
- Qikiqtarjuaq, Nunavut

Geography
- Location: Hudson Strait
- Coordinates: 62°41′12″N 070°36′09″W
- Archipelago: Arctic Archipelago
- Area: 803 km^{2} (310 sq mi)

Administration
- Canada
- Territory: Nunavut
- Region: Qikiqtaaluk

Demographics
- Population: Uninhabited

Qikiqtarjuaq (Inuktitut syllabics: ᕿᑭᖅᑕᕐᔪᐊᖅ) formerly Big Island is an uninhabited island located in the Qikiqtaaluk Region, Nunavut, Canada. It lies in Hudson Strait and is separated from Baffin Island by White Strait. The closest community is Kimmirut, 28 km (17 mi) away.

Other islands in the immediate vicinity include Upirngiviaaluk and Rabbit Island.

Of the several islands in Nunavut's Qikiqtaaluk Region named Qikiqtarjuaq or Big Island, this one has an area of 803 km^{2} (310 sq mi).
