= Belle Sheridan (1852) =

Two-masted schooner built in New York

Belle Sheridan was a two-masted schooner built in 1852 at Oswego, New York, that traded on Lake Ontario during the mid to late 19th century. After sinking at Toronto Harbour in 1878, she was raised, repaired, and entered back into service. She was lost again in the Great Gale of November 7, 1880, after she wrecked on Weller's Beach, Prince Edward County, Ontario. Six of her seven crew were lost.

== Background ==
The vessel was crafted of white oak for her paneling and beams, and pine for her deck. She featured two sails with four jibs and large gaff topsails, a typical design for trading vessels on the Great Lakes at the time. Her wood structure was found to be in good shape after her first sinking in shallow waters and was designated as "B-1" worthiness in 1878, making her eligible to carry lighter loads of goods. Captain McSherry would move his family onto the vessel after purchasing the salvage rights for $3,600 and investing a further $3,000 in repairs. After her repairs and at the time of her sinking, her official length was 123 feet (37 m).

== Sinking ==
After her raising and overhaul in 1878, the Belle Sheridan served as a family ship for the McSherrys, a well-known waterfront family of Irish descent and the vessel was homeported in Toronto. In late October 1880, the vessel was loaded with wheat for a routine transfer between Toronto and Oswego. She made the downbound run in 16 hours, unloaded, and proceeded to Rochester, New York. At Rochester, she loaded 300 tons of coal for Toronto merchant J.R. Bailey. The crew consisted of six people, including McSherry.

On November 6, 1880, with a light southerly wind, the schooner towed out of Charlotte Harbor near Rochester. She hugged the southern coast and was expecting to use an anticipated westerly shift off Thirty Mile Point that would let her cruise north to Toronto. By roughly 11:00pm that night, the winds had shifted unexpectedly, and the barometer fell as heavy weather loomed. The crew subsequently moved to reef all sails to prevent damage. Roughly an hour later, near midnight, a strong south-western gale formed, and the ship battled to maneuver the storm with limited sails.

In the early morning hours of November 7, the mainsail of the vessel burst, breaking the main gaff and boom of the vessel. By 6:00 am, the crippled vessel had reached Presqu'ile Point, but the vessel was unable to dock at the port due to the after sail having been destroyed. Instead, the crew decided to anchor near the port, still under hurricane-force winds. During this period, the storm would sheer both anchors loose from the vessel, as well as all chain attached to them.

Around noon on November 7, the vessel began to drift after breaking loose from her final anchor. The west-northwestern wind blew the vessel roughly five miles (8.0 km), until the vessel eventually struck ground in the outer breakers off Weller's Beach near the entrance to Wellers Bay. The vessel was in roughly 12 feet (3.7 m) of water, though the strong seas and surf made abandoning the vessel difficult. A large crowd gathered on the beach at Consecon and Brighton and attempted to back wagons down into the surf to reach the stricken vessel. As the surf started to destroy the vessel, the crew gathered near the forecastle. In a desperate bid, Captain McSherry seized an eight-foot (2.4 m) section on pine decking and leapt into the water, attempting to reach shore and secure a rescue boat. He was ultimately unsuccessful in his attempt, and was rescued by civilians roughly one mile (1.6 km) from where he had jumped in. Shortly after the captain leapt overboard, the vessel broke apart in the strong surf. All members of the crew other than the captain perished.
