= Elisha Sanguya =

Inuk artist

- Born: November 25, 1957 (age 67); Nunavut

Elisha Sanguya (born 1957) is an Inuk sculptor and printmaker. He is a part of the Igutaq Group of printmakers in Clyde River, Nunavut.

His work is included in the collections of the Musée national des beaux-arts du Québec, the National Gallery of Canada and the Winnipeg Art Gallery.
