= Beacon Island (Ungava Bay) =

Uninhabited island in the Canadian Arctic

Geography
- Location: Ungava Bay
- Coordinates: 58°54′02″N 66°20′28″W
- Archipelago: Arctic Archipelago
- Highest elevation: 208 m (682 ft)

Administration
- Canada
- Territory: Nunavut
- Region: Qikiqtaaluk

Demographics
- Ethnic groups: Inuit

Beacon Island is a small uninhabited island in Ungava Bay, Qikiqtaaluk Region, Nunavut, Canada. It lies just off Cape Naujaat, on the west side of the mouth of the George River, Quebec.

== See also ==
- Anguttuaq, formerly Beacon Island
- Beacon Island (Hudson Strait)
- Upajjana, formerly Beacon Island
