= Richard Stamps =

American anthropology professor

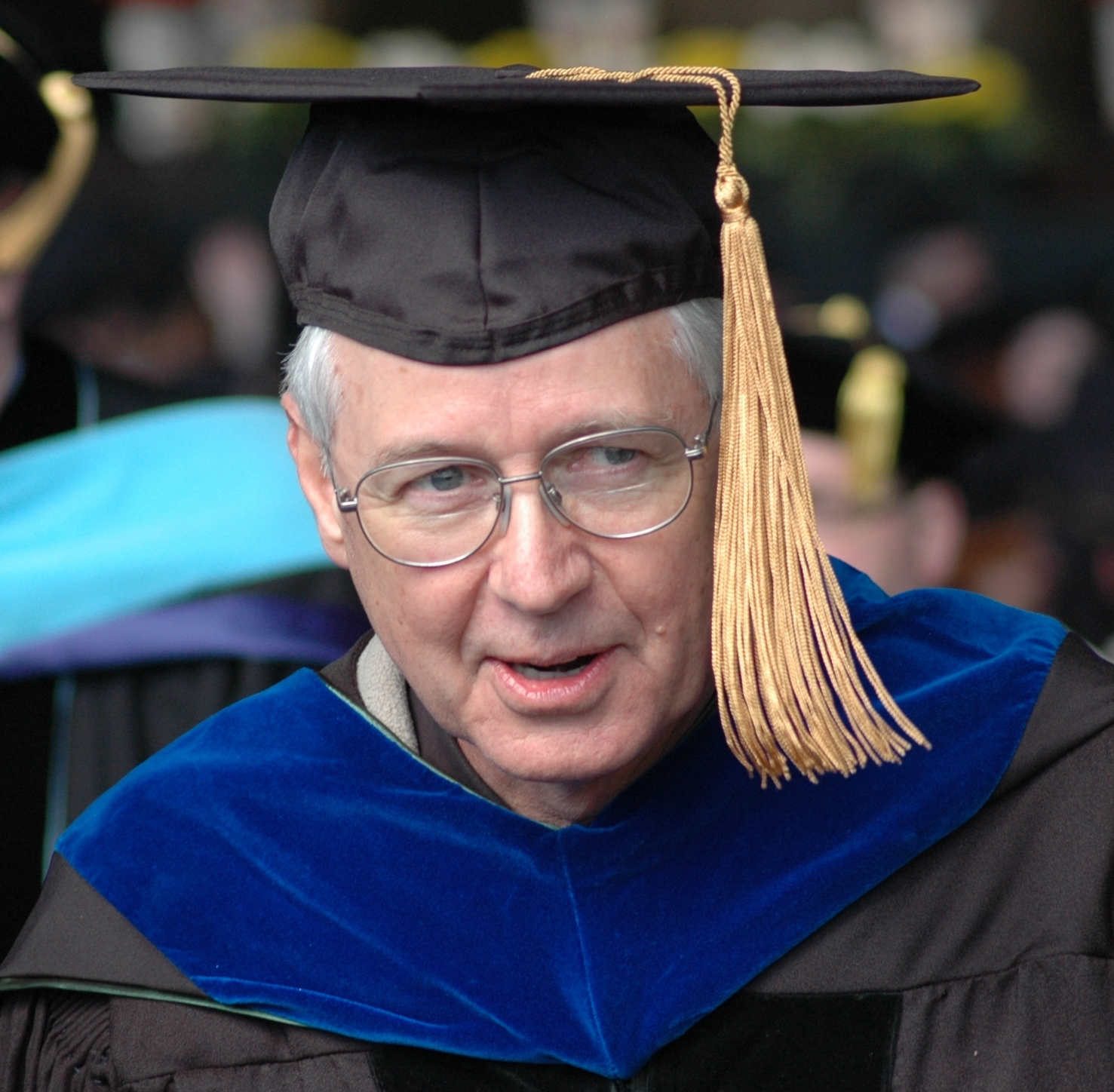
Stamps in 2006

Richard B. Stamps (born 1942) is a retired American associate professor of anthropology at Oakland University and Chair of The Ambassador Leonard Woodcock Legacy. He taught from 1974 to 2012, retiring after 37 years of teaching. He is an expert on archaeology and cultural anthropology of Taiwan and China. He is known by his Chinese name Yin Yinyin (Chinese: 尹因印; Pinyin: Yĭn Yīnyìn).

Stamps was born in Oakland, California. He grew up in the San Francisco Bay area. He was a missionary for the Church of Jesus Christ of Latter-day Saints in Taiwan from 1962 to 1965.

Stamps earned bachelor's and master's degrees in archaeology from Brigham Young University and a Ph.D. in anthropology from Michigan State University. His thesis was an archaeological survey of the Pʹuli Basin in West Central Taiwan.

From 1994 to 1997 Stamps was president of the Taiwan Taipei Mission of the LDS Church. He later served as Chairman of '50th Anniversary of the Mormon Church on Taiwan Committee'. He has also written on the impact of Latter-day Saint Missionaries in Taiwan as well as on the History of the Latter-day Saints in Taiwan.

Stamps has written on archaeology subjects unrelated to China. His article "Tools Leave Marks: Material Analysis of the Scotford-Soper-Savage Michigan Relics" deals with supposed ancient materials found in Michigan in 1894, called the Michigan relics. He co-authored a book with Bruce Hawkins and Nancy E Wright about Thomas Edison's boyhood home titled Search for the House in the Grove.

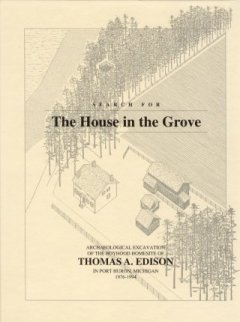
Search For The House In The Grove

Stamps has done archaeology field work in Taiwan, the United States and Mexico. He has also studied the Yurok Indians in California, the Fremont Culture in central Utah, the Anasazi Culture in the American Southwest, the Maya of the Yucatán Peninsula of Mexico, the Neolithic cultures of central Taiwan, the Yami of Orchid Island, the Silk Road of Central Asia, various prehistoric cultures in Michigan and 19th century historic sites in Michigan and Illinois.
