= Anirnik Ragee =

Inuk artist (born 1935)

- Born: 1935 (age 90–91); South Baffin Island
- Notable work: "Field of Verse"

Anirnik Ragee (born 1935) is an Inuk artist.

== Early life ==
Ragee was born in 1935 on South Baffin Island. Her parents were artists Jamasie Teevee (1910–1985) and Angotigolu Teevee (1910–1967).

== Career ==
Ragee's most famous piece is the 2004 lithograph "Field of Verse." Britt Galpen, writing for Inuit Art Quarterly, describes the piece as "interlocking and colliding syllabic characters rendered in a palette of vibrant yellow, orange and red, cool blue, green and purple, brown and inky black. . . a pulsating image that sways and nudges across the page, creating undulating shapes that spill over the edges of its boxy form, with Ragee's layered Inuktitut words creating a complex word puzzle, seemingly legible only in small fragments. Taken from a distance, however, its composition invites the eye to form and reform swirling skies or layered horizons or something else altogether."

Ragee's work is held in several museums, including the National Gallery of Canada, the National Portrait Gallery, and the University of Michigan Museum of Art.
