= Presqu'ile tombolo =

High Bluff Island, Gull Island and the Presqu'ile tombolo

Presqu'ile is a tombolo on the north shore of Lake Ontario in Northumberland County. When proglacial Lake Iroquois drained, leaving the lower Lake Ontario five limestone islands, the largest of which was Presqu'ile Island reduced the speed of currents carrying sand and silt, causing the dynamic sand spit to grow. The spit eventually engulfed Presqu'ile Island, and two small islands. Gull and High Bluff islands remain unattached,

The Tombolo and the two remaining islands form Presqu'ile Provincial Park, and provide a temporary sanctuary for migrating birds.
