= Anna Kingwatsiak =

Canadian Inuk artist (1911–1971)

Anna Kingwatsiak (1911–1971) was an Inuk visual artist.

== Personal life ==
Kingwatsiak was born in a camp near Kimmirut in 1911, on the south shore of Baffin Island in what is now Nunavut. She was the oldest child in an artistic family, as several of her siblings were also accomplished artists, including Keeleemeeoomee Samualie (born 1919), Iyola (born 1933), Tye Adla (born 1936) and Mikigak Kingwatsiak. In the 1930s her family moved closer to Kinngait, but Kingwatsiak, who had already married, remained in Kimmirut. After her husband's 1961 death from tuberculosis she moved to Kinngait to be closer to her sisters.

== Art ==
Kingwatsiak produced drawings depicting Inuit imagery and typical scenes of Inuit life. Many of her drawings were made into prints by the West Baffin Eskimo Co-operative. She also designed printed home textiles as part of an effort to develop a commercial market for the co-operative's art in the 1950s and 1960s.

Her works are held in permanent collections at the National Gallery of Canada, the McMichael Collection, the Rhode Island School of Design Museum, the Montreal Museum of Fine Arts, and the Art Gallery of Guelph.
