= Jamasie Teevee =

Inuk artist (1910–1985)

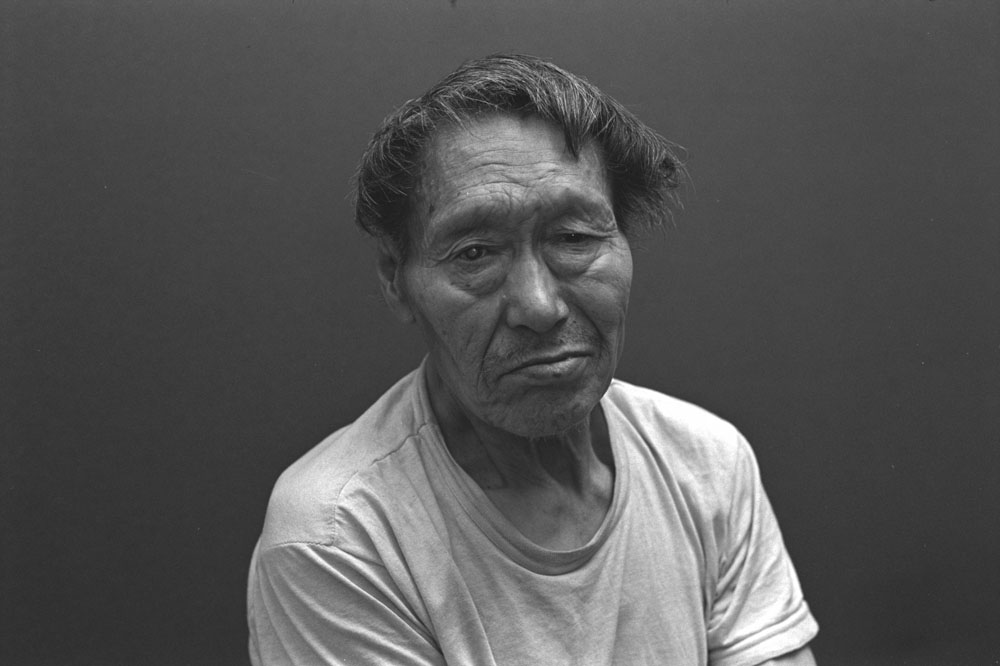
- Born: July 2, 1910; Kimmirut (Lake Harbour) area of Nunavut
- Died: October 31, 1985 (aged 75)

Jamasie Teevee (July 2, 1910 – October 31, 1985) was an Inuk artist.

== Career ==
He began to draw in the early 1960s, first focusing on engraving copper plates. However, the majority of his career was spent on printmaking.

He was the father of artists Anirnik Ragee, Parnee Peter, Nicotai Simigak, and Simeonie Teevee. He was married to artist Angotigolu Teevee, who died in 1967.

His work is held in a variety of museums, including the National Gallery of Canada, the University of Michigan Museum of Art, the Gilcrease Museum, the Canadian Museum of History, the National Museum of the American Indian, the McMaster Museum of Art, the Ackland Art Museum, the Agnes Etherington Art Centre, the Scott Polar Research Institute, the Musée national des beaux-arts du Québec, and the Museum of Anthropology at the University of British Columbia.
