= High Bluff Island (Lake Ontario) =

Island in Ontario, Canada

Coordinates: 43°58′31″N 77°44′48″W

High Bluff Island, Gull Island and the Presqu'ile tombolo

High Bluff Island is a small island off the north shore of Lake Ontario in Northumberland County, Ontario, a few hundred metres west of Presqu'ile tombolo. It is part of Presqu'ile Provincial Park. Gull Island lies between High Bluff Island and Owens Point, part of the Presqu'ile Tombolo.

The island is an important nesting site for migrating birds, so access to the public is prohibited from March 10th to September 10th.

In 2002 a 27-page management strategy recommended further measures to protect the unique environment of the island.
