= Angotigolu Teevee =

Canadian Inuk artist (1910-1967)

Angotigolu Teevee ᐊᒍᑎᕈᓗ ᑎᕕ
- Born: 1910
- Died: 1967 (aged 56–57)
- Other name: Angitteegooloo Tivi
- Occupation: Artist
- Spouse: Jamasie Teevee

Angotigolu Teevee (Inuktitut: ᐊᒍᑎᕈᓗ ᑎᕕ, also spelled Angitteegooloo Tivi; 1910–1967) was a Canadian Inuk artist. She practiced printmaking and drawing, with major works mainly on Inuit mythology themes. Teevee lived and worked in the community of Cape Dorset, Nunavut, where she was part of a group of Inuit artists. She was born in 1910, and died at 57 in 1967. Her husband, Jamasie Teevee, and her brother, Tikituk Qinnuayuak, were also accomplished artists. The Teevees' children (including Anirnik Ragee, Parnee Peter, Nicotai Simigak, and Simeonie Teevee) also work in the arts, mainly in sculpture.

== Works ==
Teevee was part of the vibrant art community of Cape Dorset, or Kingnait, which produced large numbers of nationally known artists and sculptors, particularly in the 1950s and 1960s. While the artist worked in a variety of themes, Teevee's imagery in her most well-known drawings and prints are largely animal, spirit and human figures from Inuit storytelling and mythology. Most of her print work is from her original drawings; she produced over 380 prints in her lifetime. Teevee's pieces were part of the influential Cape Dorset collections of Inuit art in the early 1960s. The McMichael Canadian Art Collection holds a number of Teevee's pieces, with others permanently housed by Indigenous and Northern Affairs Canada and the Canadian Museum of History in Ottawa, and the Art Gallery of Hamilton.
