= Tasiujarjuaq =

Lake in Nunavut, Canada

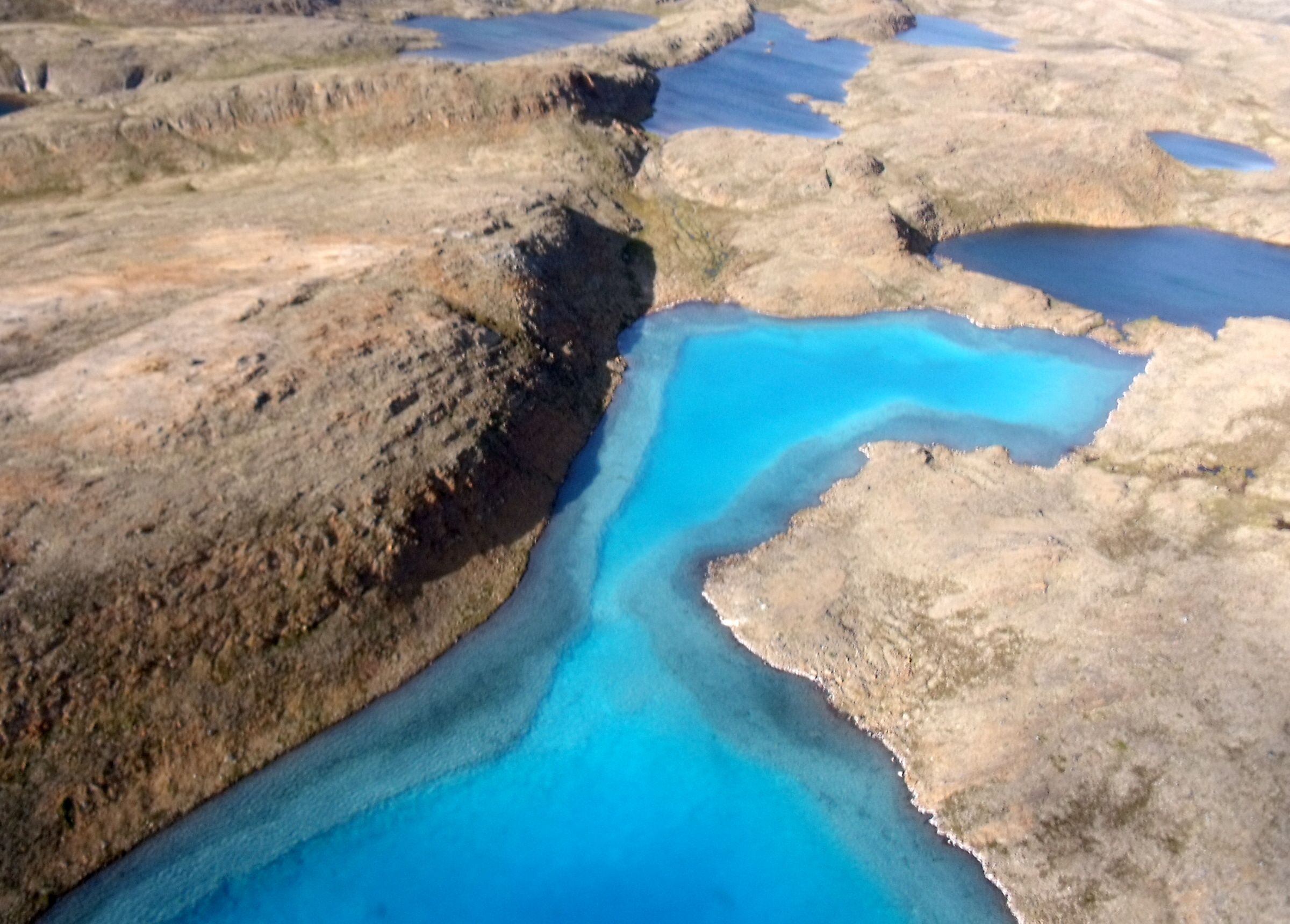
- Tasiujarjuaq near Kimmirut

- Location within Nunavut
- Location: Baffin Island, Nunavut
- Coordinates: 62°53′08″N 69°53′20″W
- Primary inflows: Soper River
- Primary outflows: Pleasant Inlet
- Basin countries: Canada
- Settlements: Kimmirut

Tasiujarjuaq (Inuktitut syllabics: ᑕᓯᐅᔭᕐᔪᐊᖅ, meaning "big lake-like lake") formerly Soper Lake is a large, irregularly shaped lake in the Qikiqtaaluk Region, Nunavut, Canada. It is located on Baffin Island's Meta Incognita Peninsula. The Inuit name references the lake's meromictic attribute, a mixture of fresh and salt water caused by a set of reversing falls and 9–10 m (30–33 ft) tides in Pleasant Inlet. The fresh water of Soper River drains into the lake which then drains into the salt water of Pleasant Inlet before reaching the Arctic Ocean.

The hamlet of Kimmirut (previously, Lake Harbour) is situated at Glasgow Bay. In 1911, Hudson's Bay Company established its first south Baffin trading post at Lake Harbour.

The river and lake were named by Canadian biologist and Arctic explorer, J. Dewey Soper who travelled in the area in 1931.

== Fauna ==
The lake is home to Greenland cod.
