= Michigan relics =

American archeology hoax

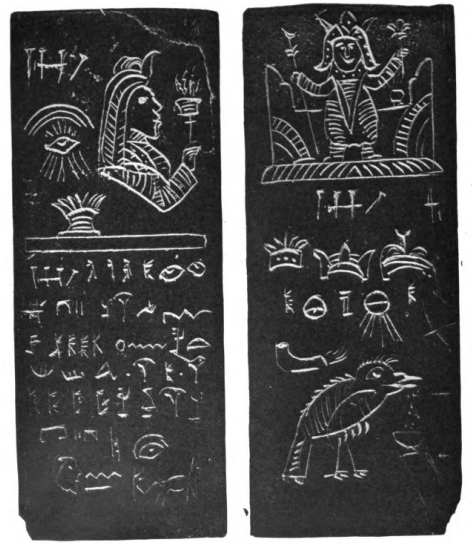
A photo of one of the Michigan relics published in the Deseret Museum Bulletin in 1911.

The Michigan Relics (also known as the Scotford Frauds or Soper Frauds) was a series of alleged ancient artifacts that were "discovered" during the late nineteenth and early twentieth century. They were presented by some to be evidence that people of an ancient Near Eastern culture had lived in the peninsula of North America now known as the U.S. state of Michigan prior to the era of Columbian contact with the New World. Many scholars have determined that the artifacts are archaeological forgeries. The Michigan Relics are considered to be one of the most elaborate and extensive pseudoarchaeological hoaxes ever perpetrated in American history.

== "Discovery" of the Relics ==
In October 1890, James O. Scotford of Edmore, Michigan, claimed that he had found a number of artifacts, including a clay cup with strange symbols and carved tablets, with symbols that looked vaguely hieroglyphic. The find attracted interest, and eager looters arrived to look for more artifacts. Many more elaborate discoveries were made in the area around Wyman in Montcalm County, Michigan following Scotford's original discovery. Scotford was a well-known digger and sign painter in the area of Wyman. He and his company "would dig until they located an artifact, and then the dignitaries who sponsored the work were invited to remove that artifact". Within the first year of Scotford's initial discovery a syndicate was formed in Montcalm County of interested parties. The syndicate purchased many of the artifacts and attempted to exploit the finds financially for the region.

By 1907, Scotford joined forces with Daniel E. Soper, former Michigan Secretary of State, and together they presented thousands of objects made of various materials, supposedly found in 16 counties across Michigan. Soper had resigned as Secretary of State for the State of Michigan after being accused of embezzlement. The objects included coins, pipes, boxes, figurines and cuneiform tablets that depicted various biblical scenes, including Moses handing out the tablets of the Ten Commandments. On November 14, 1907, the Detroit News reported that Soper and Scotford were selling copper crowns they had supposedly found on heads of prehistoric kings, and copies of Noah's diary. Scotford often arranged for a local person to witness him "unearthing" the objects.

Scotford and Soper had many trusting customers who strongly believed in the relics. In 1911, one John A. Russell published a pamphlet, "Prehistoric discoveries in Wayne County, Michigan," in which he argued for their authenticity. James Savage, former pastor of the Most Holy Trinity Catholic Church in Detroit, bought 40 of the objects. Savage believed them to be "remains relevant to the descendants of the Lost Tribes of Israel," and continued to believe in the relics until his death (in 1927).

== Debunking ==
In 1891, Professor Albert Emerson came out to the sites to get a better look at the "artifacts" that he called "bad enough in the photograph... an examination proved them to be humbugs of the first water." In 1892, Professor Francis W. Kelsey, professor of Latin and Literature at the University of Michigan, along with Professor Morris Jastrow, Jr., librarian and professor of Semitic languages at the University of Pennsylvania, assessed the languages found on the objects. Kelsey and Jastrow deemed the Michigan Relics frauds containing a "horrible mixture" of jumbled ancient scripts. The consensus among most all early scholars who assessed the relics was that they were archaeological forgeries, based on the following evidence:

- The hieroglyphs were stamped cuneiform characters in random order.
- The figures on some of the discoveries included lions with no tails, an omission which would not have occurred by "primitive" artists.
- The clay items were dried on a machine-sawed board.
- The objects disintegrated in water, indicating that they could not have been buried in the ground for very long.

Archaeologists and historians continually concluded that the objects were forgeries. On July 28, 1911, professor Frederick Starr of the University of Chicago declared in the Detroit News that the so-called relics were fakes. Mary Robson, who lived in a room next door to Scotford's sons Percy and Charles, stated that the boys manufactured more "relics" all the time. In 1911, Scotford's stepdaughter signed an affidavit in which she stated that she had seen him making the objects and that when she denied their validity he had threatened her life. While most scholars and academics have determined that Scotford was the craftsman and Soper was the salesman, and the men joined forces for personal financial gain, neither man ever confessed and remained active in the business until their respective deaths in the 1920s.

== The Relics and LDS ==
The finds attracted the interest of some members of the Church of Jesus Christ of Latter-day Saints (LDS Church). In 1909, Mormon scientist James E. Talmage participated in a "dig" and then thoroughly tested the artifacts in his lab back in Utah. His investigations led him to label the artifacts as frauds. In August 1911, he published a work on his findings titled "The 'Michigan Relics': A Story of Forgery and Deception." Rudolph Etzenhouser, who was a traveling elder of the Reorganized Church of Jesus Christ of Latter Day Saints (RLDS), saw the relics as proof of the historicity of the Book of Mormon. Etzenhouser even published a book on his collection of the Michigan Relics.

After James Savage died in 1927 he bequeathed his collection of the relics to the University of Notre Dame. While at Notre Dame, the relics sat dormant until the 1960s when Milton R. Hunter, president of the New World Archaeological Foundation, uncovered the relics. Hunter spent the rest of his life attempting to use the relics to prove the historicity of the Book of Mormon. Hunter connected the relics to the "Michigan Mound Builders," which he deemed to be the Nephites from the Book of Mormon. Hunter's rhetoric and work with the Michigan Relics perpetuated pseudoarchaeology in religion, with efforts to prove pre-Columbian contact and the myth of the mound builders. Notre Dame gave Hunter the collection in the 1960s and before his death in 1975 he deeded the collection to the LDS Church. Following Hunter's death, the Church kept the collection in their museum in Salt Lake City, Utah for decades. In 2001, the Church had the relics examined by Professor of Anthropology Richard B. Stamps, of Oakland University and found that the artifacts were made with contemporary tools.

The LDS Church kept 797 of the objects in their Salt Lake City Museum. In 2003, they gave them to the Michigan History Museum in Lansing where they currently reside. The Museum developed an exhibition surrounding the objects called "Digging Up Controversy: The Michigan Relics" which was on display in the fall and winter of 2003.
