= Soper River =

- Location within Canada

Location
- Country: Canada
- Territory: Nunavut

The Soper River (Inuktitut: Kuujuaq, meaning "the great river") (62.9°N 69.85°W) is a waterway on Baffin Island, Nunavut. The river flows over 100 km (62 mi) and then empties into Soper Lake and Pleasant Inlet. The Soper River was designated a Canadian Heritage River in 1992.

== Research ==
The Soper River region's plants have not been studied or inventoried since the 1920s. In June 2012 four Canadian botanists from the National Herbarium of Canada travelled to the Soper River region to assess the region's botanical biodiversity by collecting samples and cataloguing the plant specimens. The expedition was part of a five-year project to record Arctic flora and improve the taxonomy of the Arctic ecology.

== See also ==
- List of rivers of Nunavut
