= Presqu'ile Provincial Park =

Provincial park in Ontario, Canada

- IUCN category II (national park)
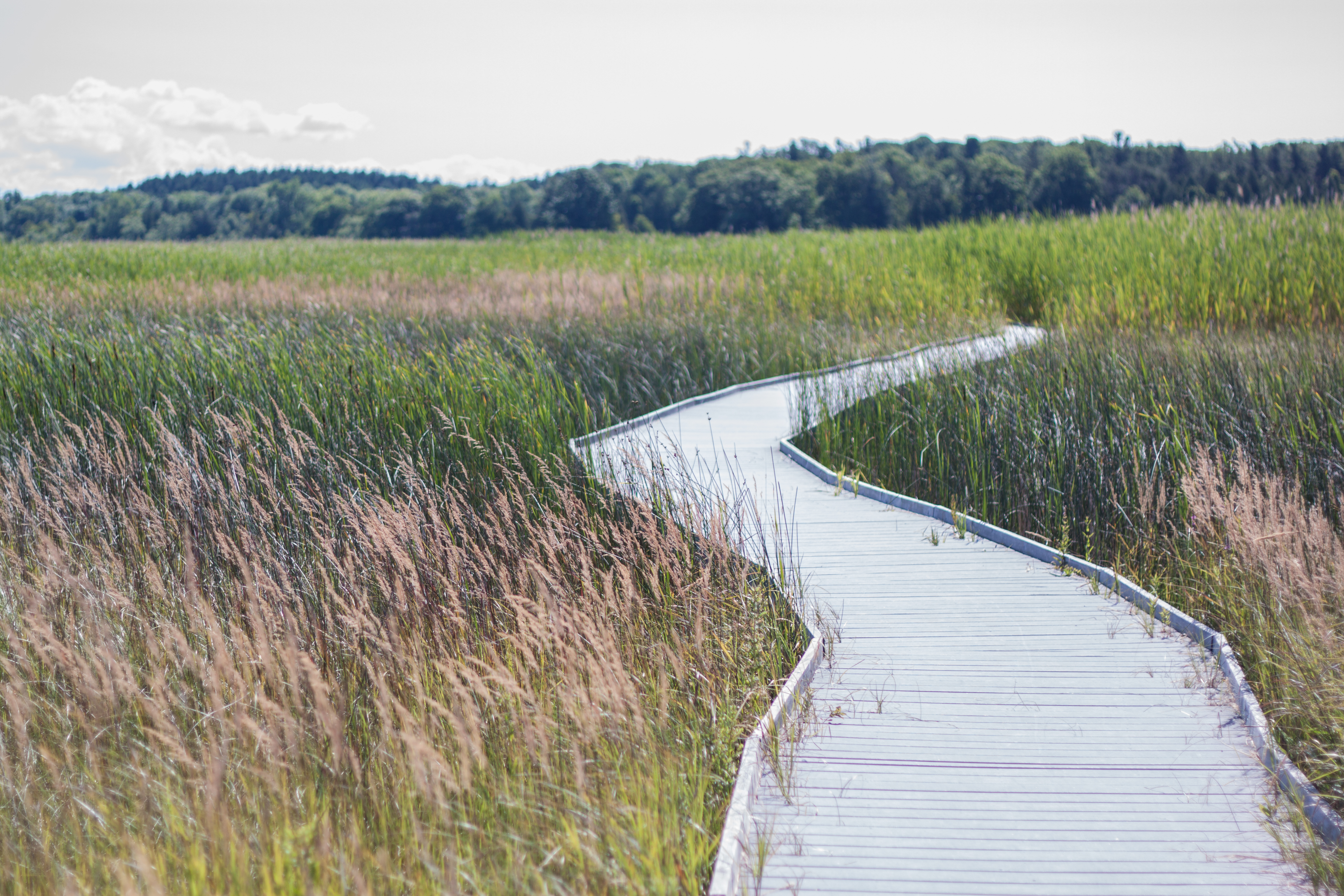
- Presqu'ile Marsh

- Location within Southern Ontario
- Interactive map of Presqu'ile Provincial Park
- Location: Northumberland County, Ontario
- Nearest city: Brighton, Ontario
- Coordinates: 43°59′38″N 77°42′47″W
- Area: 9.37 km^{2} (3.62 sq mi)
- Established: 1922
- Visitors: 246,897 (in 2022)
- Governing body: Ontario Parks
- Website: www.ontarioparks.ca/park/presquile

Presqu'ile Provincial Park is a park in southeastern Northumberland County on the north shore of Lake Ontario near the town of Brighton in Ontario, Canada. The park occupies an area of 9.37 km^{2} (3.62 sq mi). The name of the park is the French word for peninsula, or literally "almost island", and was believed to be named by Samuel De Champlain on his second expedition. The peninsula was formed when a limestone island was connected to the mainland by a sand spit; this kind of formation is referred to as a tombolo.

== Nature and ecology ==
The park's wetlands are one of the larger wetlands along the north shore of Lake Ontario, and are noteworthy for the many sand ridges running through them, which increases habitat diversity. The mixture of sand dunes, marshes and forests leads to very high plant diversity.

In some ways, the flora of this site is therefore similar to the much larger sand spit at Long Point. The long sand spits in Presqu'ile also create natural vegetation gradients from sand dunes and pannes to coniferous and deciduous forest. Sand dunes and pannes are uncommon along the north shore of lake Ontario. Pannes are an unusual moist sand habitat, calcareous and seasonally flooded, similar to a wet prairie or wet meadow. This creates situations with high plant diversity. The pannes support many unusual plants, such as Carex aurea, Cladium mariscoides, Scleria verticillata, Parnassia glauca and Physostegia virginiana. The colourful pink flowers of the Physostegia are a good indicators of panne habitat during the summer. Because of their scarcity and scientific importance, these wetlands have been used to develop and test general models for factors affecting diversity in plant communities. In drier conditions, these pannes grade into more typical sand dune vegetation. In wetter conditions, they grade into rich marshes and sedge meadows, which intergrade with forested sand ridges in the "Fingers". This rare and distinctive vegetation type is not mentioned in the park's resource management plan., and has been damaged in the past by factors such as road construction, mowing and planting of exotic tree species.

The dunes and wetlands arise out of natural processes, such as the natural high and lower water periods in the Great Lakes. Both the area of wetlands, and the number of plant species in them, depends upon a combination of high water and low water years over decades.

The park's location on Lake Ontario makes it a perfect stop over for migrating birds along the Michigan Flyway. For this reason is it also an important location for viewing migrating birds and monarch butterflies. The park's long beaches make it particularly appealing to migrating shorebirds. Limestone islands near the park area support large nesting colonies of double-crested cormorants, Caspian and common terns, several gull species, great blue herons, great egrets, and black-crowned night-herons. In early spring, Presqu'ile Bay is an important staging area for thousands of migrating waterfowl. The park also includes a large marsh which provides nesting habitat for rails, bitterns and other wetland birds. There are also forested areas and open fields: a wide variety of habitats in a relatively small park. There is also a fairly substantial population of white-tailed deer, whose grazing is doing significant damage to native plants in general, and to tree regeneration in particular. Presqu'ile has been identified as a Canadian Important Bird Area. In all this small park has seven distinct ecosystems.

== History ==
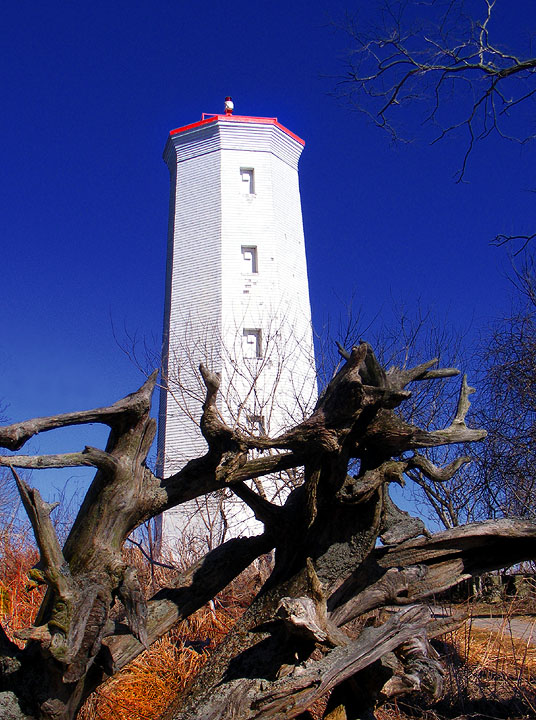
Presqui'le Lighthouse

The park area had been selected in 1797 as the site of a town called Newcastle which was to become the county seat. However, on October 8, 1804, the schooner HMS Speedy, which was bringing officials to a trial at the new courthouse, sank offshore with all on board lost. The ship was never found, nor the bodies of the passengers and crew. The county seat was moved to nearby Amherst (now Cobourg, Ontario). In 1840, a lighthouse was completed at Presqu'ile Point. The designer of the 69-foot, octagonal structure was Nicol Hugh Baird. Baird also designed the Murray Canal, parts of the Trent-Severn Waterway and the Rideau Canal. Today, this lighthouse stands as the second oldest operating lighthouse on the north shore of Lake Ontario.

In 1922, a private commission was given authority to develop a park at Presqu'ile. In the 20th century, Presqu'ile became popular for recreation, with two kilometres of sandy beaches, a summer hotel and dance pavilion, an annual regatta race, a nine-hole golf course and opportunities for boating. As the decades passed, the type of recreation enjoyed at the park changed which caused the dismantling of the golf course and the closure of the hotel and dance pavilion. Presqu'ile was incorporated into the Ontario Parks system in 1954 and has become a popular destination for campers, naturalists, and other users.

== Facilities and activities ==
Presqu'ile has 397 campsites, day use area, beach, store and two visitor centres. The park is aimed at family recreation, and offers a Natural Heritage Education program. The park often holds special events such as the Waterfowl Weekend in March, History Weekend in August, Parks Day, and Canada Day celebrations. Recreational activities popular at Presqu'ile include cycling, swimming, paddling, fishing, hiking, wildlife viewing, and hunting.
