= Everett Mountains =

Group of mountains in Nunavut, Canada

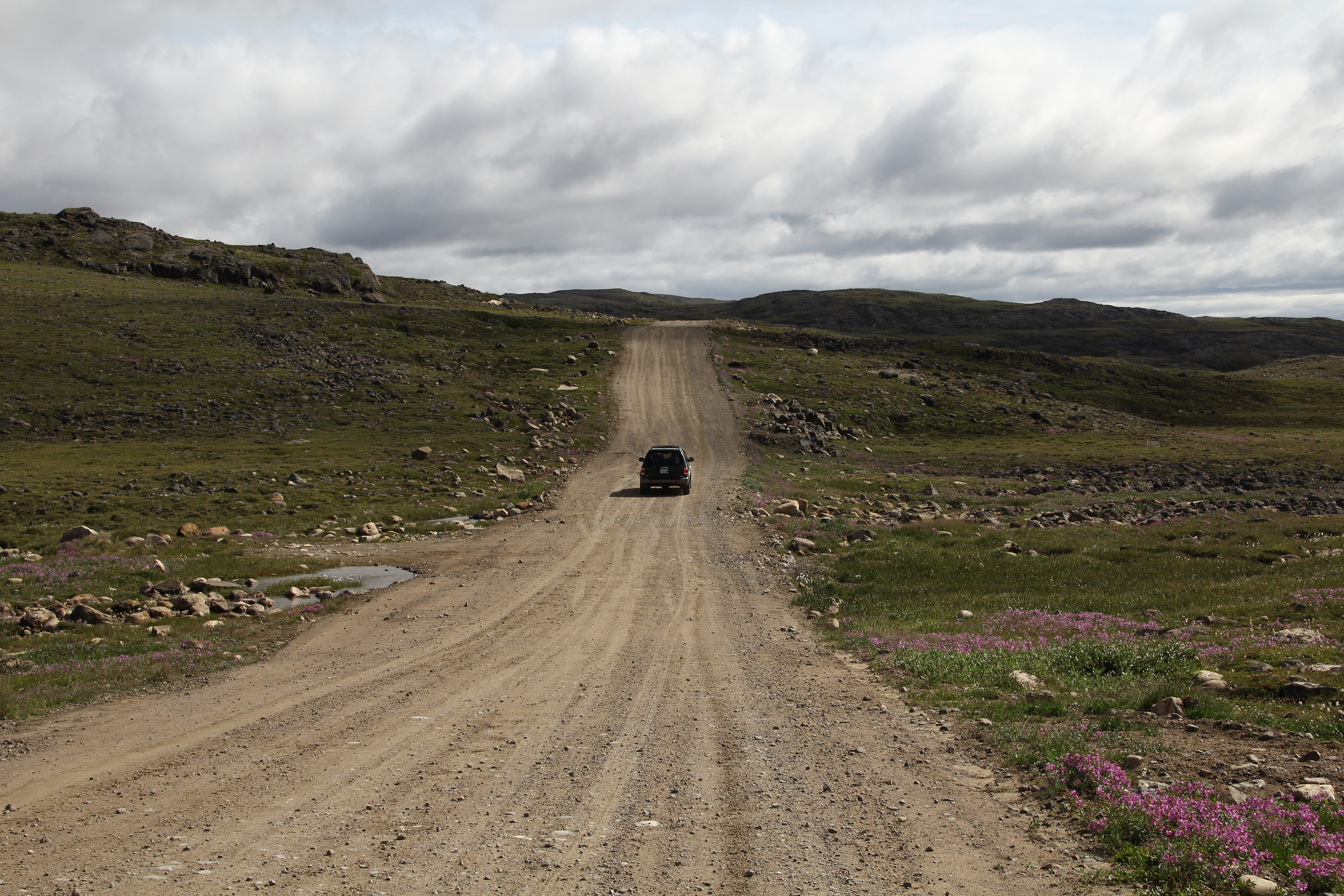
- Ascending the Everett Mountains along the Road to Nowhere, northeast of Iqaluit.

Highest point
- Coordinates: 62°45′N 67°12′W

Geography
- Location within Nunavut
- Country: Canada
- Region: Nunavut
- Parent range: Arctic Cordillera

The Everett Mountains are a mountain range located at Frobisher Bay on southern Baffin Island, Nunavut, Canada. Nunavut's capital city Iqaluit is protected by the Everett Mountains. The mountain range is a subrange of the Arctic Cordillera.

== See also ==
- List of mountain ranges
