= Osuitok Ipeelee =

Canadian Inuk sculptor (1923-2005)

- ᐅᓱᐃᑐ ᐃᐱᓕ
- Born: October 23, 1923; Neeouleeutalik Camp, Nunavut, Canada
- Died: 2005 (aged 81–82); Cape Dorset, Nunavut, Canada
- Known for: sculptor

Osuitok Ipeelee RCA (Inuktitut: ᐅᓱᐃᑐ ᐃᐱᓕ, 23 September 1923 - 2005) was an Inuk sculptor who lived in Cape Dorset, Nunavut. His sculptures in green soapstone of caribou and birds are particularly valued for their balance and delicacy. He was an early collaborator with James Archibald Houston, and by Houston's account was instrumental in the conception of the West Baffin Island Eskimo Cooperative. He was also one of the witnesses of the last-remembered traditional Inuit trial.

== Biography ==
Caribou in soapstone, in the collection of the Dennos Museum Center

=== Youth and early work ===
Ipeelee grew up in a traditional Inuit environment, learning to hunt and fish from his father, Ohotok Ipeelee, at a small camp near Cape Dorset. Ohotok also taught his son how to carve ivory, and as early as the age of thirteen Osuitok began to sculpt. This was encouraged by Roman Catholic missionaries, who bought carvings and commissioned small crucifixes from him. The artist's earliest extant works are ivory miniatures of hunting equipment, typical of the historic period of Inuit art, that date from the 1940s.

=== James Houston and subsequent career ===
Before Houston's 1951 expedition, Ipeelee was already regionally known as the greatest carver on Baffin Island. Under Houston's influence he began to carve sculptures in soapstone, which had a reliable market in the south. Exhibits of Inuit art at the National Gallery of Canada in 1952 and 1955 included his work, crediting him as "Oshaweetuk B". With recognition he began to receive official commissions. In 1955 he directed a team of craftsmen in the creation of the official mace for the Council of the Northwest Territories, and in 1959 he was asked to create a sculpture of Queen Elizabeth II, which was presented to the Queen upon her visit to Canada that year.

==== The birth of Inuit printmaking ====
The idea of a Cape Dorset printmaking program developed from a winter 1957 conversation between Houston and Ipeelee. When Houston explained the concept, Ipeelee declared, "We could do that."

Despite this, Ipeelee only contributed a total of four prints to the annual print collections, two in 1958 and two in 1959. He never returned to the medium explaining that he had not been paid enough for the drawings on which the prints were based, and found sculpture to be more profitable.

== Works ==
=== Notable sculptures ===
- Harpoon Head Figure (1983), serpentine. In the collection of the National Gallery of Canada.

=== Prints ===
- Musk Ox, 1958. Stonecut
- Weasel, 1958. Stonecut
- Four Musk Oxen, 1959. Stonecut and sealskin stencil
- Owl, Fox, and Hare Legend, 1959. Stonecut and sealskin stencil

== Honours ==
- National Aboriginal Achievement Award, now the Indspire Awards, recipient, 2004.
- Elected a member of the Royal Canadian Academy of Arts, 1973.
