= Kananginak Pootoogook =

Canadian Inuk artist (1935-2010)

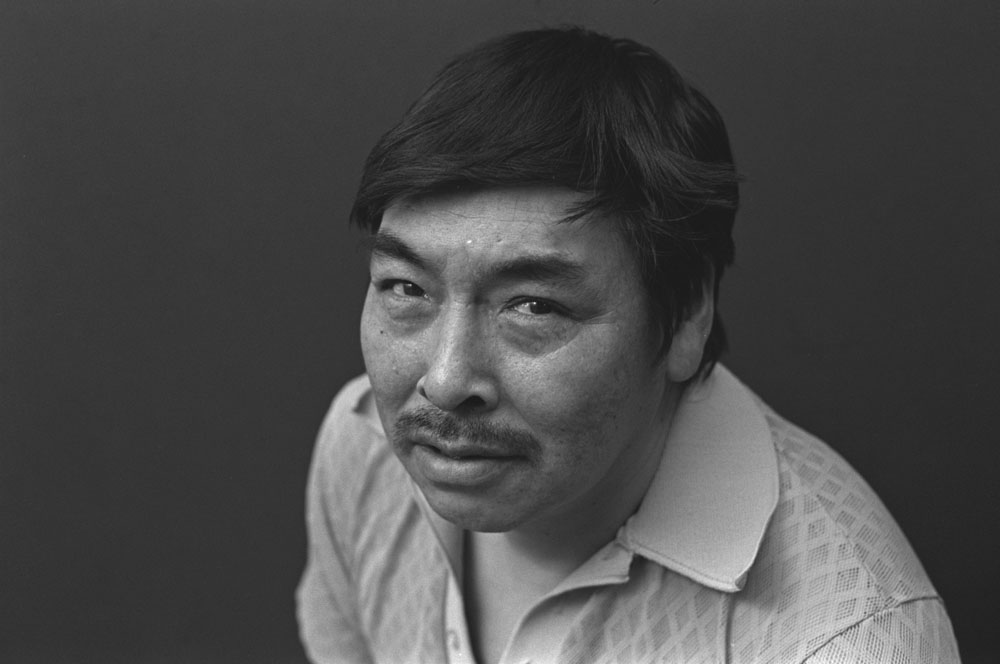
- Kananginak Pootoogook in 1980
- Born: 1935; Ikerasak, Nunavut
- Died: November 23, 2010 (aged 75); Ottawa, Ontario, Canada
- Known for: sculptor, printmaker
- Style: Inuit art
- Awards: Indspire Award; 2010
- Elected: Royal Canadian Academy of Arts; 1980

Kananginak Pootoogook RCA (1 January 1935 – 23 November 2010) was an Inuk sculptor and printmaker who lived in Cape Dorset, Nunavut, in Canada. He died as a result of complications related to surgery for lung cancer.

== Biography ==
Pootoogook was born at a traditional Inuit camp called Ikerasak, near Cape Dorset, Northwest Territories (now Kinngait, Nunavut) to Josephie (Eegyvudluk) Pootoogook, leader of the camp, and Sarah Ningeokuluk. The family lived a traditional lifestyle hunting and trapping while living in an iglu in the winter and a sod house in the summer and did not move into their first southern style house until 1942. In 1957, Pootoogook married Shooyoo, moved to Cape Dorset and began work for James Houston.

Originally, Pootoogook did some carving, made prints and lithographs for other artists. At the same time he was a leader in setting up the West Baffin Eskimo Co-operative (WBEC), the first Inuit owned co-op, now part of the Arctic Co-operatives Limited and served from 1959 until 1964 as the president. Although Kananginak had worked with his father, Josephie, in 1959, it was not until the 1970s that Kananginak began work as a full-time artist producing drawings, carvings and prints. In 1977, he cut 13 original blocks for prints that were used exclusively for the first WBEC calendar that was issued in a limited edition of 500. According to Terry Ryan, former Co-op manager, Pootoogook was both influenced by and an admirer of the works of his uncle, photographer and historian Peter Pitseolak.

The World Wildlife Fund released a limited edition set in 1977 that included four of Pootoogook's images and in 1980 he was elected to the Royal Canadian Academy of Arts. In 1997, Pootoogook built a 1.8 m (6 ft) inukshuk in Cape Dorset for former Governor General of Canada, Roméo LeBlanc. The inukshuk was dismantled and shipped to Ottawa and with the assistance of his son, Johnny, it was rebuilt at Rideau Hall and unveiled on 21 June, National Aboriginal Day.

Pootoogook had several exhibitions and showings of his work. In 2010, he went to Vancouver for the 2010 Winter Olympics and to open a showing of his work at the Marion Scott Gallery. He also had a showing of his work, his first solo exhibition at a public institution, at the Museum of Inuit Art in Toronto from February to May 2010. He also received a 2010 National Aboriginal Achievement Award in the arts category from the National Aboriginal Achievement Foundation.

While working on his final, and unfinished, drawing of a Peterhead boat owned by his father, he was struck by coughing spells, which he declared was cancer. Along with his wife, Shooyoo, he flew to Ottawa, staying at the Larga Baffin home, and was diagnosed with lung cancer. In October 2010, he underwent surgery and did not recover. He died 23 November 2010 in Ottawa. He is survived by his wife, seven children and several grandchildren and great-grandchildren. He is buried in Cape Dorset.

== Works ==
- The Small Owl (1977) lithograph, in the collection of the McCord Museum.
- Inintuq (1978), Stonecut and stencil, In the collection of the Dallas Museum of Art.
- An inukshuk (1997), assembled at Rideau Hall, Ottawa.
- Harfang (1992), Caribou (1977) and Bateau de peaux de phoque (1963), in the collection of the Musée national des beaux-arts du Québec
- Kanangina Cape Dorset Calendrier 1977 Calendar (1977) West Baffin Eskimo Cooperative, Ltd., Cape Dorset, NU
- Summer Owl (1972) lithograph, in the collection of the Gilcrease Museum
- Musk Ox (1977) lithograph, in the collection of the National Museum of Wildlife Art of the United States
- Caribou (2005) drawing at the Metropolitan Museum of Art
- Caribou (1958) print, Three Narwhal (1959) stencil on paper, Caribou Hunt (1964) print, A Big Catch (1988) print in the collection at the University of Michigan Museum of Art
- Eider Ducks (1978) lithograph on paper, Small Owl (1977) lithograph on paper, Summer Caribou (1978) lithograph on paper, in the collection at the Portland Museum of Art
- Whale lithograph at the San Juan Islands Museum of Art
- Musk Ox soapstone sculpture at Nature in Art at Wallsworth Hall, Twigworth, Gloucestershire, UK
Kayaker's Reflection in the collection of the Heard Museum

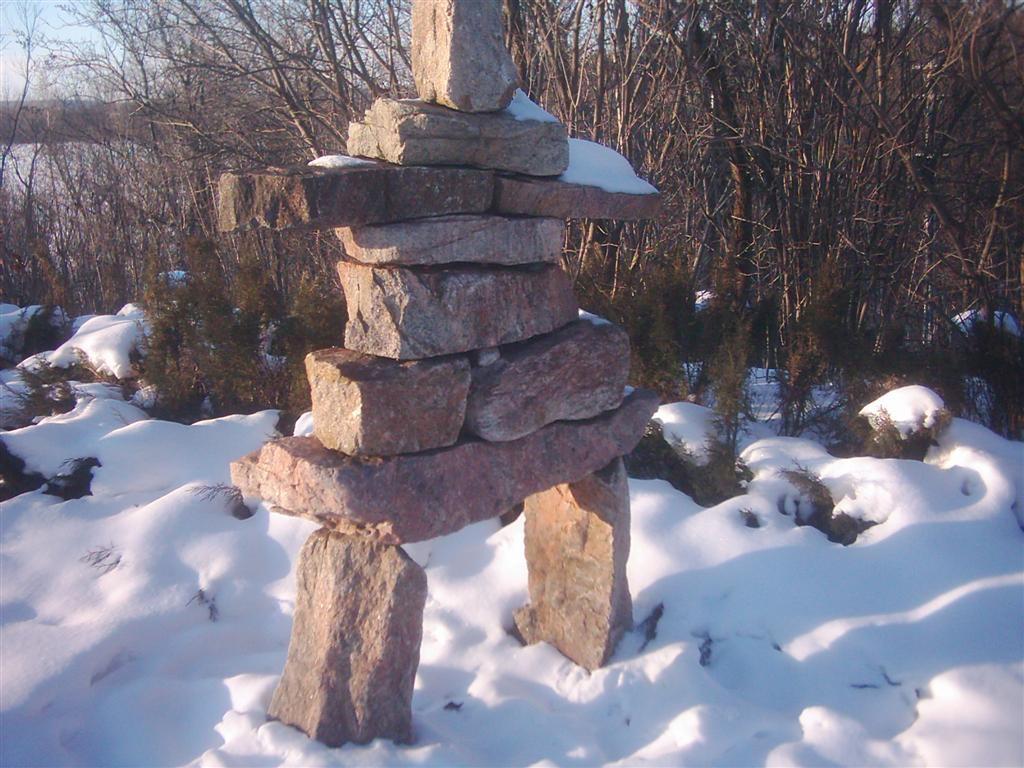
The inukshuk at Rideau Hall created by artist Kananginak Pootoogook for former Governor General of Canada, Roméo LeBlanc, for National Aboriginal Day, unveiled on 21 June 1997.

== Honours ==
- Elected a member of the Royal Canadian Academy of Arts, 1980.
- National Aboriginal Achievement Award, arts category 2010.
