= Meta Incognita Peninsula =

Peninsula of Baffin Island, Nunavut Territoty, Canada

Coordinates: 62°45′01″N 068°29′58″W

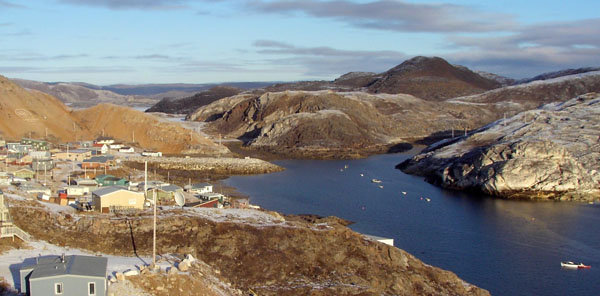
Kimmirut, Meta Incognita Peninsula, 2006

The Meta Incognita Peninsula is located on southern Baffin Island in the Canadian territory of Nunavut. It is bounded by Hudson Strait to the south, and Frobisher Bay to the north. The hamlet of Kimmirut is on the Hudson Strait on the southern coast of the western peninsula.

On his second voyage in July, 1577, Martin Frobisher claimed this area in the name of Queen Elizabeth I of England. The Queen named it Meta Incognita, Latin for "the unknown limits." Frobisher's 1578 voyage was originally planned to establish a settlement here.
