= Kaavvijjuaq =

Uninhabited island in Nunavut, Canada

- Location within Nunavut Location within Canada

Geography
- Location: Hudson Strait
- Coordinates: 62°41′19″N 69°35′27″W
- Archipelago: Arctic Archipelago

Administration
- Canada
- Territory: Nunavut
- Region: Qikiqtaaluk

Demographics
- Population: Uninhabited

Kaavvijjuaq (Inuktitut syllabics: ᑳᕝᕕᔾᔪᐊᖅ) formerly Lee Island is an uninhabited island located in the Qikiqtaaluk Region, Nunavut, Canada. It is a Baffin Island offshore island in Hudson Strait, and a member of the Sheer Islands, along with Qaqqannalik, Lavoie Island, and Wishart Island. The closest community is Kimmirut, 25.4 km (15.8 mi) away.
