= Lavoie Island =

Island in Nunavut, Canada

- Location within Nunavut Location within Canada

Geography
- Location: Hudson Strait
- Coordinates: 62°42′N 069°34′W
- Archipelago: Arctic Archipelago

Administration
- Canada
- Territory: Nunavut
- Region: Qikiqtaaluk

Demographics
- Population: Uninhabited
- Source: Lavoie Island at Atlas of Canada

Lavoie Island is an uninhabited island located in Qikiqtaaluk Region, Nunavut, Canada. It is a Baffin Island offshore island in Hudson Strait, and a member of the Sheer Islands, along with Forder Island, Lee Island, and Wishart Island. The closest community is Kimmirut, 24.5 km (15.2 mi) away. It has been named after Constable Joseph Adolphe Arthur Lavoie who served in Royal Canadian Mounted Police (RCMP#10332) from July 4, 1927, to October 15, 1941.
