= Qaqqannalik =

Island in Nunavut, Canada

- Location within Nunavut Location within Canada

Geography
- Location: Hudson Strait
- Coordinates: 62°40′48″N 69°35′58″W
- Archipelago: Arctic Archipelago

Administration
- Canada
- Territory: Nunavut
- Region: Qikiqtaaluk

Demographics
- Population: Uninhabited

Qaqqannalik (Inuktitut syllabics: ᖃᖅᑲᓐᓇᓕᒃ) formerly Forder Island is an uninhabited island located in the Qikiqtaaluk Region, Nunavut, Canada. It is a Baffin Island offshore island in Hudson Strait, and a member of the Sheer Islands, along with Lee Island, Lavoie Island, and Wishart Island. The closest community is Kimmirut, 24.1 km (15.0 mi) away.
