= Ungirlauttat =

Island in Nunavut, Canada

- Location within Nunavut Location within Canada

Geography
- Location: Hudson Strait
- Coordinates: 62°48′25″N 69°49′07″W
- Archipelago: Arctic Archipelago

Administration
- Canada
- Territory: Nunavut
- Region: Qikiqtaaluk

Demographics
- Population: Uninhabited

Ungirlauttat (Inuktitut: ᐅᖏᕐᓚᐅᑦᑕᑦ) formerly Uugalautiit Island is an uninhabited island located in the Qikiqtaaluk Region, Nunavut, Canada. It is a Baffin Island offshore island in Hudson Strait. The closest community is Kimmirut, 6.2 km (3.9 mi) away.
