= Qaiqsuarjuk =

Island in Nunavut, Canada

- Location within Nunavut Location within Canada

Geography
- Location: Hudson Strait
- Coordinates: 62°42′49″N 069°33′38″W
- Archipelago: Arctic Archipelago

Administration
- Canada
- Territory: Nunavut
- Region: Qikiqtaaluk

Demographics
- Population: Uninhabited

Qaiqsuarjuk (Inuktitut syllabics: ᖃᐃᖅᓱᐊᕐᔪᒃ) formerly Wishart Island is an uninhabited island located in the Qikiqtaaluk Region, Nunavut, Canada. It is a Baffin Island offshore island in Hudson Strait, and a member of the Sheer Islands. The closest community is Kimmirut, 23.1 km (14.4 mi) away.
