= Kimmirut =

Kimmirut ᑭᒻᒥᕈᑦ
- Hamlet
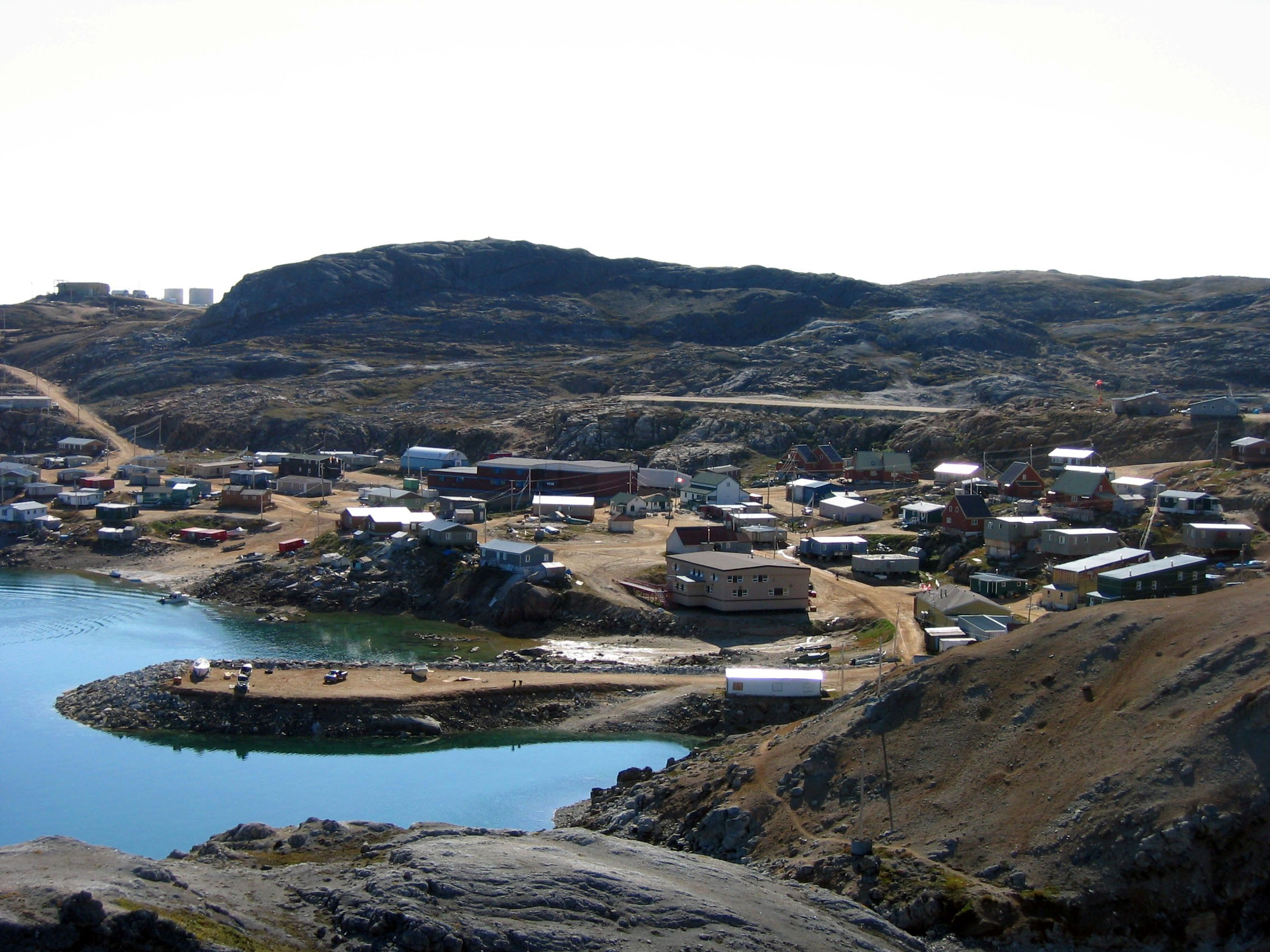
- Kimmirut, Nunavut

- Location within Nunavut Location within Canada
- Coordinates: 62°50′48″N 069°52′19″W
- Country: Canada
- Territory: Nunavut
- Region: Qikiqtaaluk
- Electoral district: South Baffin
- Anglican mission: 1909

Government
  - Mayor: Maliktuk Lyta
  - MLA: David Joanasie

Area (2021)
  - Total: 2.3 km^{2} (0.89 sq mi)
- Elevation: 53 m (174 ft)

Population (2021)
  - Total: 426
  - Density: 185.2/km^{2} (480/sq mi)
- Time zone: UTC−05:00 (EST)
  - Summer (DST): UTC−04:00 (EDT)
- Canadian Postal code: X0A 0N0
- Area code: 867
- Website: www.kimmirut.ca

Kimmirut (Syllabics: ᑭᒻᒥᕈᑦ [kimːiɢut]; known as Lake Harbour until 1 January 1996) is a community in the Qikiqtaaluk Region, Nunavut, Canada. It is located on the shore of Hudson Strait on Baffin Island's Meta Incognita Peninsula. Kimmirut means "heel", and refers to a rocky outcrop in the inlet.

It was at one time a Hudson's Bay Company trading post, and a Royal Canadian Mounted Police post. The Canadian explorer J. Dewey Soper used these posts as headquarters during his explorations in the 1920s and 1930s.

The community is served by Kimmirut Airport and by annual supply sealift. A proposal in 2005 for a road to Iqaluit was determined to be impractical owing to roundabout routing over the mountains.

== Demographics ==
Federal census population history of Kimmirut
Year	Pop.	±%
1976	235	—
1981	252	+7.2%
1986	326	+29.4%
1991	365	+12.0%
1996	397	+8.8%
2001	433	+9.1%
2006	411	−5.1%
2011	455	+10.7%
2016	389	−14.5%
2021	426	+9.5%
Source: Statistics Canada

In the 2021 Canadian census conducted by Statistics Canada, Kimmirut had a population of 426 living in 116 of its 150 total private dwellings, a change of 9.5% from its 2016 population of 389. With a land area of 2.3 km^{2} (0.89 sq mi), it had a population density of 185.2/km^{2} (479.7/sq mi) in 2021.

== Broadband communications ==
The community has been served by the Qiniq network since 2005. Qiniq is a fixed wireless service to homes and businesses, connecting to the outside world via a satellite backbone. The Qiniq network is designed and operated by SSI Micro. In 2017, the network was upgraded to 4G LTE technology, and 2G-GSM for mobile voice.

== Climate ==
Kimmirut has an Arctic climate (Köppen: ET), although it is well outside the Arctic Circle. The city has cold winters and short summers that are too cool to permit the growth of trees. It is north of the tree line, and average monthly temperatures are below freezing for eight months of the year. Kimmirut averages just over 335 mm (13.2 in) of precipitation annually, wetter than many other localities in the Arctic Archipelago, with the summer being the wettest season.

Climate data for Kimmirut
Month	Jan	Feb	Mar	Apr	May	Jun	Jul	Aug	Sep	Oct	Nov	Dec	Year
Record high °C (°F)	2.0 (35.6)	4.0 (39.2)	5.0 (41.0)	7.0 (44.6)	15.0 (59.0)	26.0 (78.8)	29.0 (84.2)	31.0 (87.8)	22.0 (71.6)	18.0 (64.4)	6.0 (42.8)	4.9 (40.8)	31.0 (87.8)
Mean daily maximum °C (°F)	−21.0 (−5.8)	−21.0 (−5.8)	−16.0 (3.2)	−8.0 (17.6)	0.0 (32.0)	8.0 (46.4)	13.0 (55.4)	12.0 (53.6)	6.0 (42.8)	0.0 (32.0)	−7.0 (19.4)	−15.0 (5.0)	−4.1 (24.6)
Daily mean °C (°F)	−26.0 (−14.8)	−26.0 (−14.8)	−21.5 (−6.7)	−13.0 (8.6)	−3.5 (25.7)	4.5 (40.1)	8.5 (47.3)	8.0 (46.4)	3.0 (37.4)	−3.0 (26.6)	−11.5 (11.3)	−20.0 (−4.0)	−8.37 (16.93)
Mean daily minimum °C (°F)	−31.0 (−23.8)	−31.0 (−23.8)	−27.0 (−16.6)	−18.0 (−0.4)	−7.0 (19.4)	1.0 (33.8)	4.0 (39.2)	4.0 (39.2)	0.0 (32.0)	−6.0 (21.2)	−16.0 (3.2)	−25.0 (−13.0)	−12.7 (9.1)
Record low °C (°F)	−45.0 (−49.0)	−47.0 (−52.6)	−44.0 (−47.2)	−34.0 (−29.2)	−24.0 (−11.2)	−9.0 (15.8)	−2.0 (28.4)	−3.0 (26.6)	−13.0 (8.6)	−27.0 (−16.6)	−36.0 (−32.8)	−44.0 (−47.2)	−47.0 (−52.6)
Average precipitation mm (inches)	16.4 (0.65)	14.5 (0.57)	15.5 (0.61)	24.0 (0.94)	30.0 (1.18)	30.0 (1.18)	31.0 (1.22)	40.4 (1.59)	43.4 (1.71)	34.9 (1.37)	30.0 (1.18)	25.4 (1.00)	335.5 (13.21)
Source: MSN Monthly Averages and Records

== Notable residents ==
- Joe Arlooktoo
- Nakasuk
- Anna Kingwatsiak
- Oopik Pitsuilak
- Pudlo Pudlat
- Jamasie Teevee

== Gallery ==
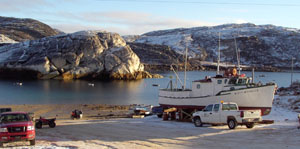
Boat launch in Kimmirut. The "heel" can be seen to the left. 2006

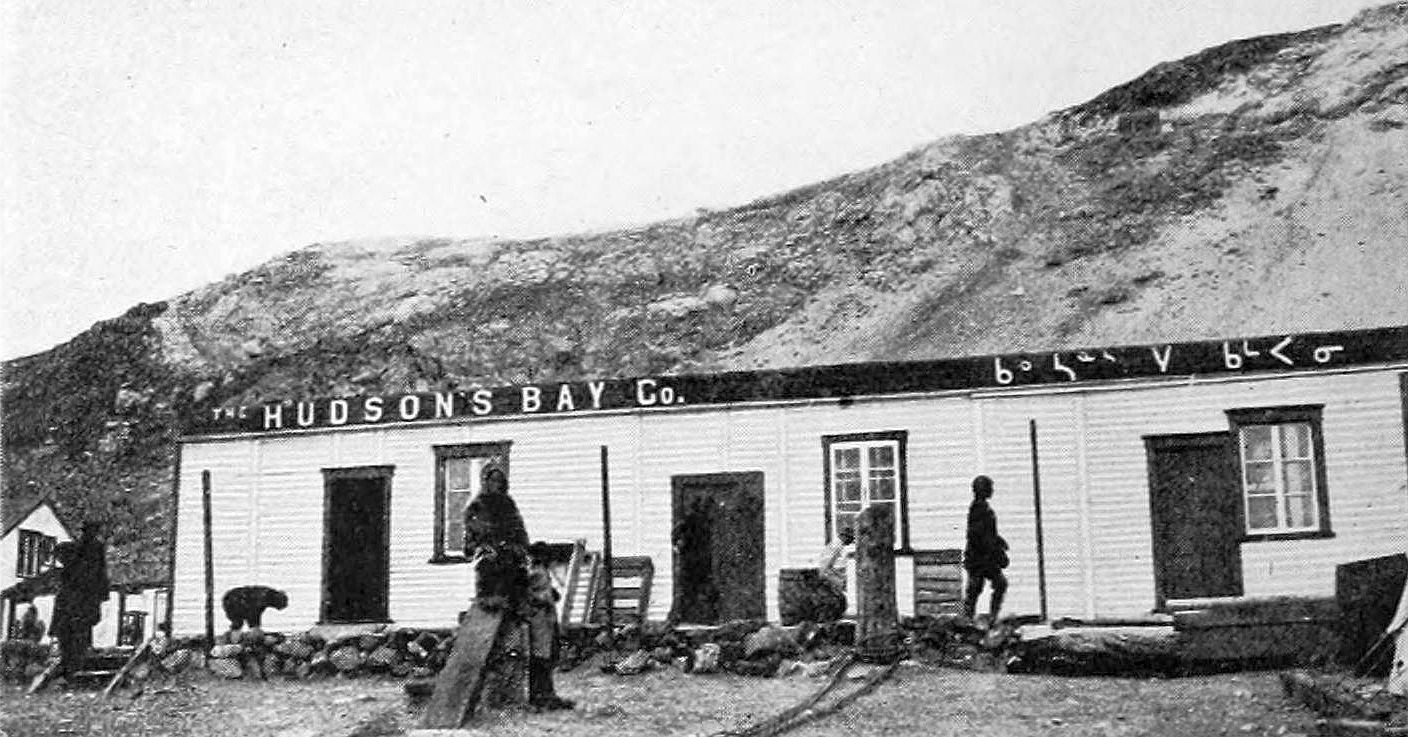
Hudson's Bay Company in Lake Harbour, 1922

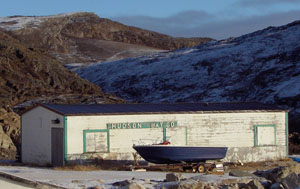
Hudson's Bay Company, 2006

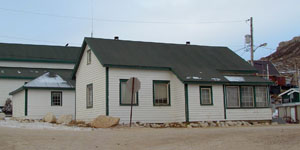
The Soper House dates back to the 1930s. 2006.

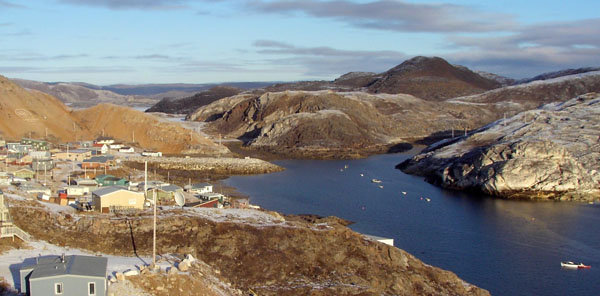
View of Kimmirut, 2006

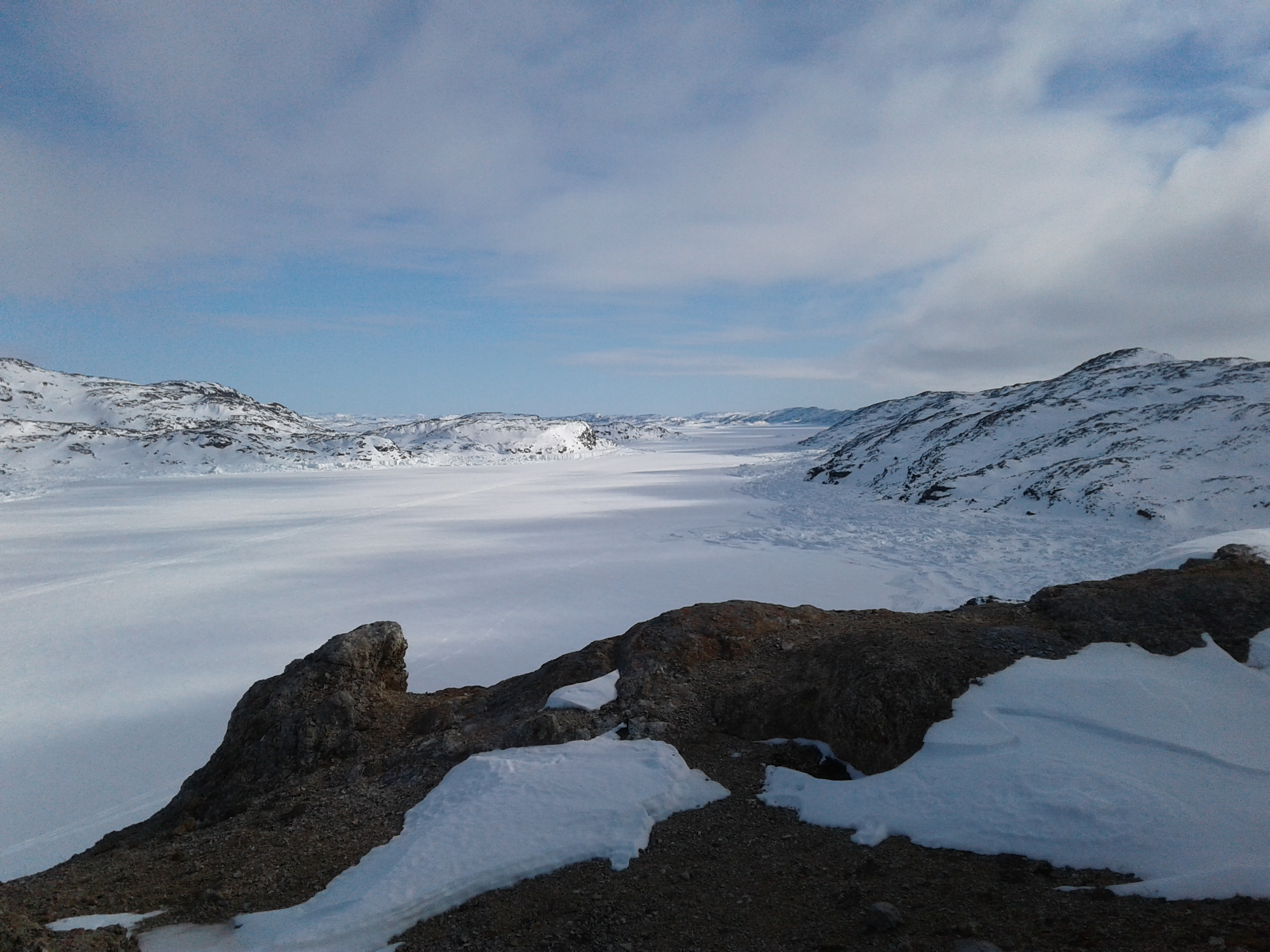
View of Southeast Kimmirut, 2017

== See also ==
- List of municipalities in Nunavut
- Tasiujarjuaq
