= Inuit art =

Art created by Inuit of the Arctic

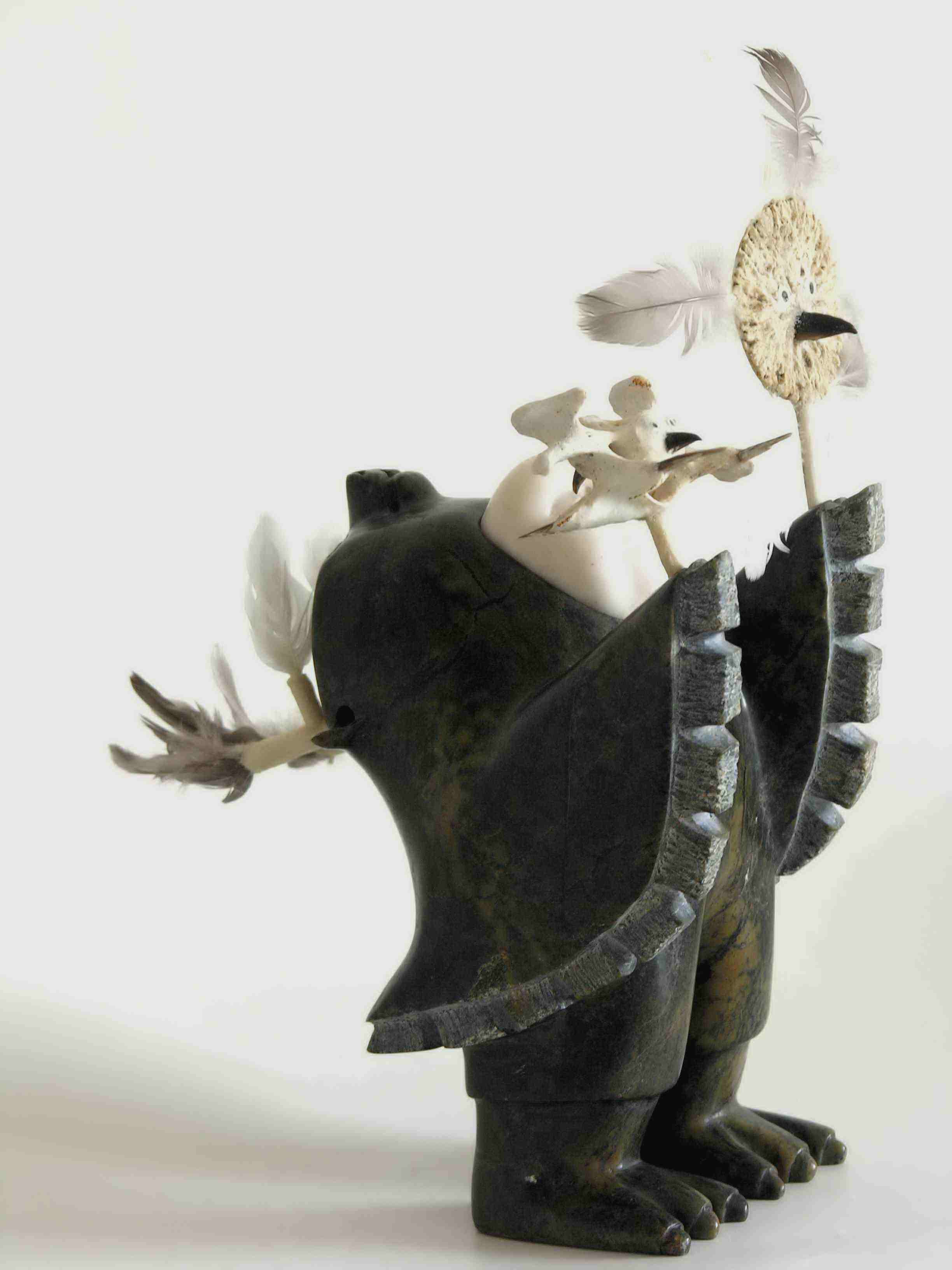
Angakkuq, a sculpture by Pallaya Qiatsuq (Kinngait, Nunavut, Canada)

Inuit art, also known as Eskimo art, refers to artwork produced by Inuit, previously known as Eskimos, and other related circumpolar peoples. Historically, their preferred medium was walrus ivory, but since the establishment of southern markets for Inuit art in 1945, prints and figurative works carved in relatively soft stone such as soapstone, serpentinite, or argillite have also become popular.

The Winnipeg Art Gallery has the largest public collection of contemporary Inuit art in the world. In 2007, the Museum of Inuit Art opened in Toronto, but closed due to lack of resources in 2016.

== History ==
=== Pre-Dorset and Dorset cultures ===
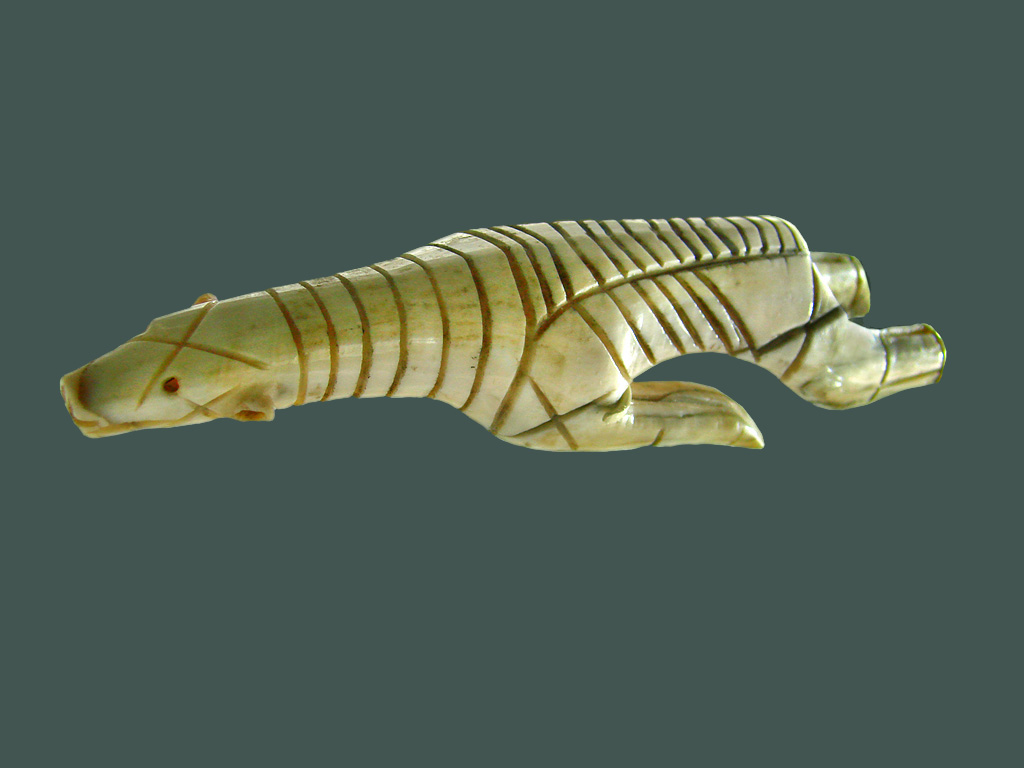
Swimming polar bear carved from walrus ivory, Middle Dorset culture, Iglulik region, Canada

Around 4000 BCE nomads known as the Pre-Dorset or the Arctic Small Tool tradition (ASTT) crossed over the Bering Strait from Siberia into Alaska, the Canadian Arctic, Greenland, and Labrador. Very little remains of them, and only a few preserved artifacts carved in ivory could be considered works of art. The Dorset culture, which became culturally distinct around 600 BCE, produced a significant amount of figurative art in the mediums of walrus ivory, bone, caribou antler, and on rare occasion stone. Subjects included birds, bears, walruses, seals, and human figures, as well as remarkably small masks. The Dorsets depicted bears and other animals in ivory with lines indicating their skeletal system incised on the surface of the ivory; bears in such a style are known as "flying bears". These items had a magical or religious significance, and were either worn as amulets to ward off evil spirits, or used in the Inuit religion.

=== Ipiutak culture ===
The Ipiutak culture of Alaska seems to represent a period of refinement and elaboration in Inuit artistic production. The artwork is extremely complex, incorporating geometric, animal, and anthropomorphic designs.

=== Thule culture ===
Around 1000 CE, the people of the Thule culture, ancestors of today's Inuit, migrated from northern Alaska and either displaced or replaced the earlier Dorset inhabitants --it is unclear if this process was violent or intentional. Thule art had a definite Alaskan influence, and included utilitarian objects such as combs, buttons, needle cases, cooking pots, ornate spears and harpoons. The graphic decorations incised on them have been interpreted as purely ornamental, with no obvious religious significance, but perhaps intended to make the objects used in everyday life appealing.

All Inuit weapons, tools, and utensils were made by hand from natural materials: stone, bone, ivory, antler, and animal hides. Nomadic people could take very little else with them besides the tools of their daily living; non-utilitarian objects were also carved in miniature so that they could be carried around or worn, such as delicate earrings, dance masks, amulets, fetish figures, and intricate combs and figures which were used to tell legends and objectify their religion and oral history.

=== 16th century ===
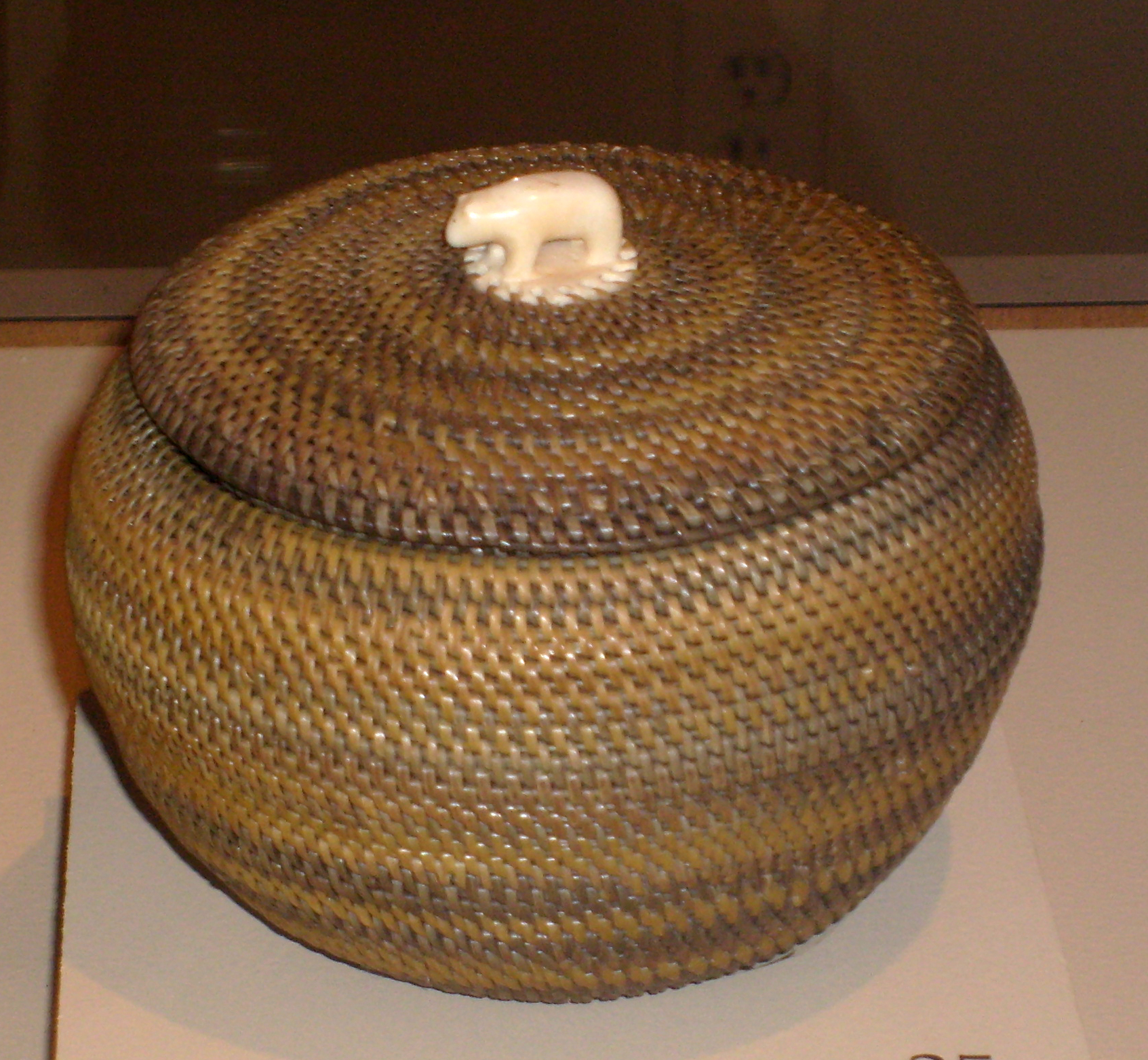
Alaskan Inupiat woven baleen basket with a walrus ivory finial, depicting a polar bear, c. early 20th century

In the 16th century Inuit began to barter with European whalers, missionaries and other visitors to the north for tea, weapons or alcohol. Items previously produced as decorative tools or amulets for the angakkuq (shaman), such as carvings of animals and hunting or camping scenes, became trade commodities. Inuit artists also began producing ivory miniatures specifically as trade goods, to decorate European rifles, tools, boats, and musical instruments. Cribbage boards and carved walrus and narwhal tusks were intended for the whalers. Missionaries encouraged the use of Christian imagery, which was accepted to a limited extent.

=== Since 1945 ===
Traditionally, Inuit carved objects for decoration, use in games, religious purposes, or self-amusement. However the nature and functions of Inuit carvings changed rapidly after contact with European and European-Canadian society. This change accelerated after around 1949, when many Inuit were forcibly moved into settled communities, and the Canadian government began to encourage a carving industry as a source of income for the Inuit. The art changed markedly from the form which prevailed in the past, in size, media, motif, and style.

The Government of Canada's encouragement of commercial carving was initially heavy-handed, as is most clearly shown by the pamphlet "Eskimo Handicrafts", circulated among Inuit communities in the early 1950s. Intended to provide inspiration to Inuit sculptors, this pamphlet depicted artifacts in the collection of the Canadian Museum of Civilization; many of the objects pictured, such as totem poles, were not germane to Inuit culture.

The first generation of Inuit artists in Kinngait (formerly Cape Dorset) in the 1940s and 1950s sold their carvings to the Baffin Trading Company (1939–1946) and the Hudson's Bay Company. The West Baffin Eskimo Cooperative was founded in Kinngait in 1959 and became the primary purchaser of arts and craft items.

== Types ==
=== Block printing ===
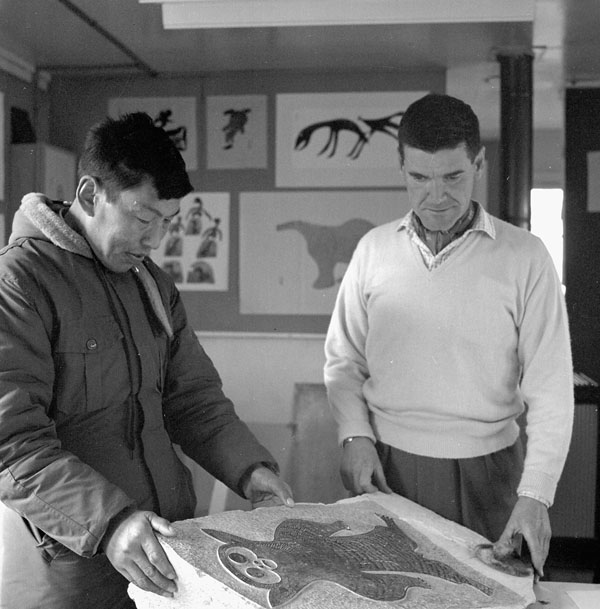
James Houston and Pauta Saila examining a stone-cut

Since the early 1950s, when Inuit graphic styles such as stenciling and block printing were being developed, some Inuit artists have adopted a polished style rooted in naturalism. Other artists, such as John Pangnark, have developed a style that is highly abstract. Both styles are generally used to depict traditional beliefs or animals.

Stone is a common choice for block printing, and its availability and the fact that the printmakers were often carvers familiar with the stone made it a good choice.

The final print is a collaboration between the printer / stone carver and the artist.

=== Drawing ===
Before the arrival of James Houston to the Arctic in the late 1940s, the Inuit did not have a tradition of drawing images on paper. Artists produced drawings and sold them to the local co-operative or print studio, which would determine the selection of images that would be made into prints. Houston encouraged artists to depict the traditional Inuit way of life in their drawings. Kinngait-based Pitseolak Ashoona was one of the first Inuit artists to explicitly include autobiographical content in her works. She had an important artistic influence on her granddaughter, Annie Pootoogook, and niece, Shuvinai Ashoona who, through her vivid drawings of everyday life in the north, played a pivotal role in establishing Inuit art as a contemporary art form.

=== Fashion ===
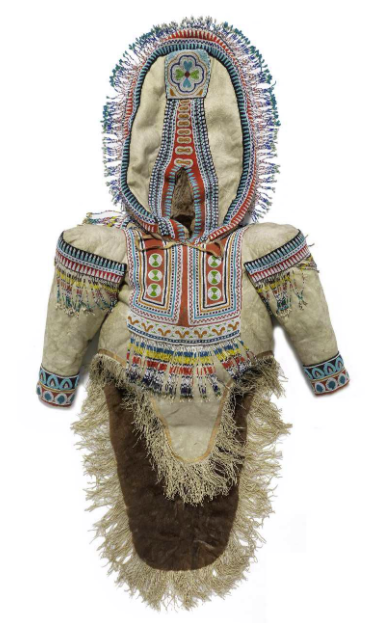
Caribou skin amauti (woman's parka) with extensive seed bead designs, Igloolik or Baffin Island Inuit, accessioned 1924

Inuit clothing has long been a means of artistic expression for Inuit seamstresses, who historically employed decorative techniques like ornamental trim and inlay, dye and other colouring methods, decorative attachments like pendants and beadwork, and design motifs, integrating and adapting new techniques and materials as they were introduced by cultural contact.

Modern Inuit fashion is a subset of the wider Indigenous American fashion movement. Contemporary Inuit and northern designers use a mix of contemporary and traditional materials to create garments in both traditional and modern silhouettes. Many designers also make jewellery from local or sustainable materials such as bone. The work of fashion designer Victoria Kakuktinniq, who focuses on parkas with traditional styling, has been cited as a major influence in the modernization of Inuit fashion. Some designers centre aspects of Inuit culture through the visual design of their products, including prints with traditional tools, contemporary northern food products, and geometric designs that originated with traditional kakiniit (Inuit tattooing).

=== Sculpture ===
Caribou in soapstone by Osuitok Ipeelee, Dennos Museum Center

Inuit sculptures had been produced prior to contact with the Western world. They were small-scale and made of ivory. In 1951, James Houston encouraged Inuit in Kinngait to produce stone carvings. It was mostly men who took up carving. Ovilu Tunnillie was one of the few women to work in sculpture and to garner a national reputation. Today, Inuit continue to carve pieces entirely by hand. Power tools are occasionally used, but most artists prefer to use an axe and file, as this gives them more control over the stone. The final stage of carving is the polishing, which is done with several grades of waterproof sandpaper and hours upon hours of rubbing. The most common material is now soapstone, serpentine, either deposits from the Arctic, which range from black to light green in colour, or orange-red imports from Brazil. Other material used in Inuit sculptures include, caribou antlers, ivory from marine mammals, and the bone of various animals.

== Inuit Art Society ==
The Inuit Art Society, of which most members are in the Midwestern United States, was established in 2003. Their mission is "To provide education about and support for the culture, art forms, and artists of the Arctic." There are approximately 100 dues-paying members. Their two-day annual meetings "include native Inuit artists from Canada, knowledgeable speakers about Inuit art and culture, a Marketplace where Inuit art can be purchased, and ample time to meet or reconnect with attendees. Most meetings also include a tour of a private collection near the meeting site and/or an opportunity for a private tour of a public collection."

== Notable Inuit artists ==
- Manasie Akpaliapik
- Germaine Arnaktauyok
- Aron of Kangeq
- Karoo Ashevak
- Kenojuak Ashevak
- Pitseolak Ashoona
- Shuvinai Ashoona
- Siasi Atitu
- Isa Aupalukta
- Peggy Ekagina
- Alootook Ipellie
- Osuitok Ipeelee
- Josephina Kalleo
- Helen Kalvak
- Simeonie Keenainak
- Siassie Kenneally
- Ruben Komangapik
- Floyd Kuptana
- Andy Miki
- Annie Niviaxie
- Jessie Oonark
- John Pangnark
- Parr
- David Ruben Piqtoukun
- Peter Pitseolak
- Timootee (Tim) Pitsiulak
- Annie Pootoogook
- Kananginak Pootoogook
- Pudlo Pudlat
- Lucy Qinnuayuak
- Andrew Qappik
- Lissie Saggiak
- Pauta Saila
- Nick Sikkuark
- Joe Talirunili
- Tanya Tagaq
- Ningiukulu Teevee
- Irene Avaalaaqiaq Tiktaalaaq
- John Tiktak
- Bernadette Iguptark Tongelik
- Simon Tookoome
- Ovilu Tunnillie
- Marion Tuu'luq
- Natar Ungalaaq

== See also ==
- Alaska Native art
- Arctic Experience McNaught Gallery
- Art Gallery of Ontario
- North American Native Museum
- Inuksuk
- Lists of Inuit
- List of Indigenous artists of the Americas
- List of Greenlandic artists
- Visual arts of the Indigenous peoples of the Americas
