= Museum of Inuit Art =

Museum in Toronto, Ontario, Canada

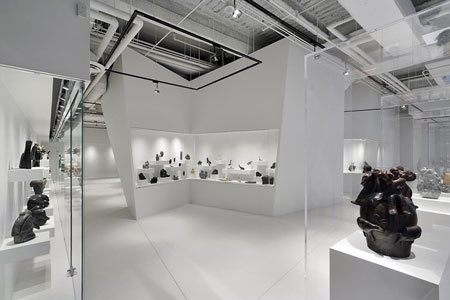

- Location of the gallery in Toronto
- Established: June 2007
- Dissolved: May 29, 2016
- Location: Toronto, Ontario, Canada
- Coordinates: 43°38′20″N 79°22′50″W
- Type: Inuit art
- Director: David Harris
- Public transit access: 509
- Website: www.miamuseum.ca

The Museum of Inuit Art, also known as MIA, was a museum in Toronto, Ontario, Canada located within the Queen's Quay Terminal at the Harbourfront Centre. It was devoted exclusively to Inuit art and culture.

== Background ==
With more than 6,000 square feet of exhibition space in the Queen's Quay Terminal, the museum represented the largest permanent display of Inuit art in Canada. Curator Norman Zepp claimed that the museum was the first museum dedicated exclusively to Inuit art, and, as a result, “the viewer gets a concentrated and focused experience.”

Four years in the making prior to its 2007 opening, the museum existed due to the efforts of David Harris— a former teacher in Nunavut and founder of a commercial gallery for Inuit art, as well as a group of dedicated partners. They included Zepp, who was the curator of Inuit art at the Art Gallery of Ontario from 1988 to 1994, Cynthia Waye, the museum's associate curator, and a number of private art collectors.

The museum owned more than 1,000 original pieces of art, and were composed of its in-house collection and a number of works on loan from private donors. The primary focus is sculpture— carved from stone, antler, ivory and bone, although prints, drawings and tapestries are also on display. Of these, a majority are from the Contemporary (around 1945 to 1990) and Post-Contemporary (1990s to today) periods, and represented the subjects, forms, media and artists associated with modern Inuit art.

According to Zepp, visitors to the museum will not only saw “some of the best art produced in the Canadian Arctic,” but will also gained “an understanding of the scope and breadth of Inuit art,” through exhibits outlining common thematic elements and regional stylistic diversity. Temporary displays, like the current exhibit of wall hangings made by female artists in Baker Lake, were also a part of the museum.

Though humans have lived in the Arctic for more than 4,000 years, the Inuit trace their ancestry back to the period around AD 1000, when the Thule people migrated across the Canadian territories from northern Alaska. The museum housed a selection of pieces from this ancestral epoch, including carved figures and other objects measuring "around the size of a thimble".

The museum also displayed a selection of items from what is commonly referred to as Inuit art's Historic Period— an era beginning in the 16th century, when European whalers, missionaries and explorers came into contact with the Inuit. Ivory carvings of animals were commonly bartered goods, as were replicas of tools and other Western-style objects.

== Artistic differences ==
Because a relatively small population was— and remains— dispersed across the vast swath of Arctic tundra, Inuit art took on regional distinctions over time, as hundreds of scattered family groups coalesced into the larger communities that exist today. Some of the museum's most dramatic works came from Cape Dorset (now known as Kinngait), a community on Baffin Island where artists such as Osuitok Ipeelee, Pauta Saila, and Latcholassie Akesuk incorporated a stylized naturalism into their representations of animals and mythological creatures.

The works at the museum reflected these regional differences, which are influenced by such factors as the availability of materials and the lifestyle particular to each community. Harris said that by displaying a range of regional styles, the museum "helped visitors appreciate the distinctions between, for example, the large, semi-abstract Keewatin stone carvings commonly made in Baker Lake, and the realistic family-scene sculptures by Inukjuak-area artists in northern Quebec".

== Modern examples of Inuit Art ==
The jewels of the Museum of Inuit Art were a selection of more recent sculptures created by acknowledged masters of the form, such as Joe Talirunili and Judas Ullulaq. Some of these works were individually showcased, and could be glimpsed through floor-to-ceiling windows by passerby.

Since that time, the creation of sculptures, prints, tapestries and other art has been a vital social and economic force in Arctic communities. Today, Inuit artists typically produce and sell their work through the co-operative system- locally based organizations that, among other things, arrange distribution and help to ensure artists are given fair value for their work.

The Museum's adjacent retail gallery, the MIA Gallery, received its works through the co-operatives and honoured their suggested sale prices. In this sense, the commercial gallery became something of an extension of the museum, where visitors could see the practical side of the Inuit art economy at work. All profits from the sale of works at the retail gallery went to support the Museum of Inuit Art and its operations.

== Closing ==
The museum closed on May 29, 2016. This followed a decline in visitors and revenue following two summers of construction activity along Queens Quay West, which caused the temporary closure of streetcar access to the area of the museum.

== Architecture ==
The MIA space was designed by gh3* inc. and won two design awards: the Ontario Association of Architects Design Excellence Award, and the Canada Interiors’ Best of Canada Design Competition Award. The interior of the museum was designed to "remove visitors from the commercial clutter of the adjacent downtown shopping arcade and transport them to a more rarefied environment for viewing art — a neutral white shell evoking the iconic landscape forms of the arctic ice.”

== Collection ==
Sprott

MIA acquired significant works through the generous sponsorship of Eric Sprott and the Sprott Acquisition Program in 2008.

== Reciprocal partnerships ==
MIA was a reciprocal admissions partner with the Bata Shoe Museum, Design Exchange, and the Gardiner Museum.

== Affiliations ==
MIA was affiliated with CMA, CHIN, and Virtual Museum of Canada.
