= Pootoogook =

Pootoogook (Inuktitut: ᐳᑐᒍ) is an Inuit surname. Notable people with this surname include:

- Annie Pootoogook (1969–2016), Canadian artist
- Eegyvudluk Pootoogook (1931–2000), Canadian sculptor
- Elijah Pudlat Pootoogook (born 1943), Canadian artist
- Kananginak Pootoogook (1935–2010), Canadian sculptor
- Napachie Pootoogook (1938–2002), Canadian artist
- Sharni Pootoogook (1922–2003), Canadian printmaker
