= Lucy Tasseor Tutsweetok =

Lucy Tasseor Tutsweetok was born 1934 in Nunalla, Manitoba. She was an Inuk artist. Known for her sculptures, Tasseor Tutsweetok worked principally with grey steatite, a hard stone local to Arviat on the Nunavut mainland, where the artist moved following the closing of the North Rankin Nickel Mine in 1962. Always remaining close to the stone's original form and leaving its surface unpolished, her sculptures take maternal and family groupings as their principle themes.

Notable exhibitions include: Sculpture/Inuit: Masterworks of the Canadian Arctic (1971–1973), In the Shadow of the Sun: Contemporary Indian and Inuit Art in Canada (1989–1991), and Indigena: Contemporary Native Perspectives in Canadian Art (1992), and a solo exhibition, her first, at the Art Gallery of Ontario (2011). In 1992, she completed a large sculpture for the Canadian Museum of Civilization. Tasseor Tutsweetok's minimalist and semi-abstract approach to carving is accompanied by calculated drawings upon the stone's surface, she shares this approach with her contemporaries Andy Miki, John Panaruk, and Elizabeth Nutaluk.

Lucy Tasseor Tutsweetok died on April 12, 2012, in Arviat Nunavut.
