= Siassie Kenneally =

Inuk artist (1969–2018)

- Born: May 29, 1969; Iqalugajuk
- Died: 2018 (aged 48–49)
- Known for: Graphic arts (pencil crayon)

Siassie Kenneally (29 May 1969 – 2018) was an Inuk artist based in Cape Dorset (Kinngait), Northwest Territories (now Nunavut). Kenneally was known for her pencil-crayon drawings depicting traditional Inuit lifestyles.

== Early life ==
Siassie Kenneally was born on 29 May 1969 in Iqalugajuk, a traditional camp on the South Baffin coast of Nunavut.

Kenneally comes from a family of artists, her mother Mayureak Ashoona was a celebrated print maker and her father, Qaqaq Ashoona, noted carver. She was the granddaughter of artists Sheouak Petaulassie and Pitseolak Ashoona, and cousins to Shuvinai Ashoona and Annie Pootoogook.

== Career ==
Kenneally began to draw 2004 while in the Kinngait Co-operative. She specialised in color pencil works.

Her work is included in the collections of the National Gallery of Canada and the Dennos Museum. In 2017, her work had a solo exhibition at Feheley Fine Arts titled "All the Things That I Have Seen". The work was created very soon after her son's suicide.

Kenneally died in 2018.
