= Kitikmeot =

Kitikmeot (Inuktitut: Qitirmiut ᕿᑎᕐᒥᐅᑦ) can refer to:

- Kitikmeot Region, a region of Nunavut, Canada
  - Kitikmeot, Unorganized, a census subdivision, consisting of those parts of the Kitikmeot Region outside communities
- Kitikmeot Region, Northwest Territories, a region of the Northwest Territories until 1999, with similar but non-coterminal boundaries to Kitikmeot Region, Nunavut
