= Latcholassie Akesuk =

Inuk sculptor (1919-2000)

- Born: 1919; Aiaktalik Island, Canada
- Died: 2000 (aged 80–81); Cape Dorset, Nunavut, Canada
- Occupation: Inuk sculptor

Latcholassie Akesuk (1919–2000) was an Inuk sculptor.

== Early life and family ==
He was born in 1919, on Aiaktalik Island in the Northwest Territories. His father Akesuk Tudlik (1890–1966) was a renowned sculptor, as was his brother, Solomonie Tigullaraq. His granddaughter Saimaiyu Akesuk (born 1988) is also a sculptor.

== Career ==
He began carving alongside his father in the early 1950s, and was particularly influenced by his father's owls.

He carved using the green stone common on Dorset Island around Kinngait. His work is held in a variety of museums, including the National Gallery of Canada, the Museum of Inuit Art, the University of Lethbridge Art Collection, and the University of Michigan Museum of Art.

== Later life ==
He died in 2000, in Cape Dorset, now Kinngait.
