= Akesuk Tudlik =

Inuk printmaker and carver (1890-1966)

Tudlik
- Born: Akesuk Tudlik; 1890 near Kimmirut, Nunavut, Canada
- Died: 1966 (aged 75–76)
- Known for: Stylized carvings of animals, particularly birds with round eyes; printmaking
- Style: Inuit art
- Children: 2
- Patrons: James Houston

Akesuk Tudlik, commonly known simply as Tudlik (1890–1966), was an Inuk printmaker and carver from Cape Dorset, Canada. He is best known for his stylized carvings of animals, particularly birds with round eyes.

== Early life ==
He was born in 1890 near Kimmirut, Nunavut, Canada.

== Career ==
Tudlik and his family moved to the Kinngait area in 1951, and he began selling his carvings to James Houston. He began printmaking around the same time, and was involved in the West Baffin Eskimo Co-operative. His work often depicted bears and owls, as well as hunters pursuing prey.

His work is held at several museums worldwide, including the Museum of Modern Art, the Winnipeg Art Gallery, the Art Gallery of Ontario, the National Gallery of Canada, the National Museum of the American Indian, the University of Michigan Museum of Art, the Scott Polar Research Institute, the Museum of Anthropology at UBC, the McMichael Canadian Art Collection, the Montreal Museum of Fine Arts, and the Dennos Museum Center.

== Later life ==
His sons Solomonie Tigullaraq and Latcholassie Akesuk became artists as well.
