= Judas Ullulaq =

Canadian Inuk artist

- Born: 1937; Thom Bay, Nunavut, Canada
- Died: January 9, 1999 (aged 61–62); Taloyoak, Nunavut, Canada
- Education: Self-taught
- Known for: Carving, Sculpting
- Children: 9

Judas Ullulaq (1937 - 9 January 1999) was a Canadian Inuk artist recognized for his sculpture works that are mainly figural and zoomorphic.

Ullulaq's medium for sculpting is stone as well as other mixed medias such as ivory, antler, bone, sinew, and musk-ox horn, which he uses to create askewd, wide-eyed, open-mouthed faces, with abstract gestures.

== Personal life ==
Judas Ullulaq was born just northeast of Taloyoak, in a small town called Thom Bay. His records state that Ullulaq was born in July, however he has been told that he was actually born in the fall. When he was a small child Ullulaq left Thom Bay and moved to Fort Ross, where he spent the rest of his childhood and early adulthood. As a young man growing up near the northern Arctic Circle, Ullulaq would hunt caribou, muskox, seals, and polar bears.

He and his family lived at outpost camps and when he was in his early twenties, Ullulaq moved to Spense Bay. He would eventually marry and have children, five biological children and four adopted children, which prompted his move to Taloyoak in the late 1960s, so his children could attend school.

== Art career ==
Ullulaq learned how to make dolls during his childhood, as he spent much of his time with female tribe members. When he began carving many other people were also looking to carving as a way to make money. His brothers, Charlie Ugyuk and Nelson Takkiruq, are also sculptors and Ugyuk has been credited as inspiring him to create some of the most creative and challenging sculptures to ever come out of the Arctic.

Originally at the outset, Ullulaq would carve ivory miniatures and over time his sculptures increased dramatically in size. Primarily, he sculpted in stone while using a variety of mixed-media embellishments like sinew, ivory, musk-ox horns, antlers, and bones. Many of his works used dark pyroxine stones and whale bones found near Gjoa Haven. His sculptures of people, local legends, various animals, and shamanic characters were very intricately detailed. His works have been described as holding a very strong emotional and expressive presence that is shown through their exaggerated gestures and body movements, wide-eyes, and distorted, open-mouth faces.

Many of Ullulaq’s works are part of major private and public collections focusing on Inuit art worldwide.

== Artworks ==
- "Mère et enfant (Mother and Child)" (1997)

"Mère et enfant" is a stone and antler carving of a woman ready to play a hand drum, while carrying a small child in a pouch in the hood of her parka. It is displayed in the Musée national des beaux-arts du Québec in Québec, Canada.

- "Fisherman" (1982)

"Fisherman" is a sculpture made out of black stone, antler, musk-ox, horn, and sinew. Ullulaq's inspiration was from his nephew, Karoo Ashevak. This sculpture depicts how to catch fish using a Kakivak while diverting the fish's attention. It is on display in the National Gallery of Canada in Ottawa, ON, Canada.

- "Shaman's Face"

"Shaman's Face" is a carved sculpture. His nephew, Karoo Ashevak, often made works involving spirits and supernatural beings, and this was Ullulaq's influence for the piece.

"Inukshuk (like a person), (1981-1982) Is a sculpture made from Steatite (soapstone), walrus tusk, and musk ox horn. It is on display in the de Young Museum of San Francisco.

== Exhibitions ==
Group Exhibitions

- “Mini- Masterworks III” Spirit Wrestler Gallery, Vancouver, British Columbia, Canada Oct 24, 2009- Nov 15, 2009
- "Sedna and her Creatures" Alaska on Madison, New York, United States Feb 7, 2013- Mar 16, 2013
- "Drum Dancers" Alaska on Madison, New York, United States Jan 1, 2014- Aug 31, 2014
- “10 Major Sculptures” Marion Scott Gallery, Vancouver, British Columbia Jun 25, 2016- Jul 30, 2016
- “Inuit Sculpture: Classic Works” Marion Scott Gallery, Vancouver, British Columbia Dec 02, 2017- Jan 06, 2018
- “Online: 150 years- 150 works Canadian Art as Historical Act” Galerie De L’uqam, Universite Du Quebec, Montreal, Quebec, Canada May 2.2018- May 2, 2023

== Collections ==
Judas Ullulaq works are included in:

- National Gallery of Canada
- Alaska on Madison
- Fine Arts Museums of San Francisco
