= Arctic Experience McNaught Gallery =

Coordinates: 43°15′03.2″N 79°52′17.2″W

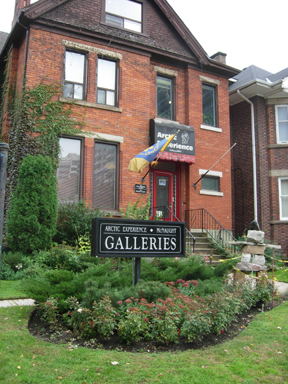
The Arctic Experience McNaught Gallery on James Street South.

The Arctic Experience McNaught Gallery is an art gallery located in Hamilton, Ontario, Canada. It specializes in Inuit art and Canadian landscape paintings.

== History ==
Hamilton natives Marvin and Lorraine Cohen moved to Baffin Island in the 1970s when Marvin accepted a teaching position in Frobisher Bay. The couple spent five years with the Inuit community there and became connected with the people and their art. They returned to Hamilton in the 1980s and opened the Arctic Experience Gallery in 1983 on Houston Street to appraise and showcase Inuit sculpture and hold exhibitions of the work of Inuit artists.

McNaught grew up in Deep River, Ontario and moved to Toronto and Burlington, Ontario before attending McMaster University. She became involved in Hamilton's arts community, sat on the Editorial Board for Art Impression Magazine, was Arts and Entertainment Editor for 701.com, and acted as Director of Beckett Gallery from 1981 until it closed in 1993.

The Cohens moved their gallery to its present location on James Street South in 1993. At that time they entered into a partnership with McNaught, who introduced a collection of Canadian paintings and prints to the gallery.

In 2015 the gallery was in the news when NcNaught was called upon to help evaluate a large art collection. Among the paintings were a number of sketches asserted to have been drawn by Group of Seven artist J. E. H. MacDonald and buried by him in the back yard of his home.

In 2016 The gallery acquired 132 pieces of Inuit art created in the 1950s and 1960s by tuberculosis patients at the Hamilton Mountain Sanitorium.

== Sculpture ==
The Cohens continue to visit Cape Dorset to bring back new sculptures from some of Canada's Inuit artists, including Pauta Saila, Kelly Qimirpik, Pudlalik Shaa, and Tukiki Manomie.

== Paintings ==
The McNaught Gallery showcases pieces from Canadian artists who work with landscape and nature motifs. There is an emphasis on Hamilton-area painters, including Brian Darcy, James Gummerson, Heather Pate, and Gisele Comtois. The gallery also features a number of historical prints, including pieces from George Thompson, Franz Johnston, Ghislain Caron, Frank Panabaker, Frederick Haines, and Major James Wallis.
