= Sharni Pootoogook =

Inuk printmaker from Kinngait (1922-2003)

- Born: 1922; Cape Dorset (Kinngait), Canada
- Died: 2003 (aged 80–81)
- Spouse: Pudlat Pootoogook

Sharni Pootoogook (also spelled Sharnie, Sharnee, or Sarni) (1922–2003) was an Inuk printmaker from Cape Dorset, Nunavut.

== Early life ==
She was born in Cape Dorset (Kinngait) in 1922. Her brother was sculptor Pauta Saila.

== Career ==
She worked primarily in printmaking, and was involved with the West Baffin Eskimo Cooperative. Her work is known for its soft colors, whimsical motifs, and strong lines.

Pootoogoook's work is kept at several museums, including the British Museum, the Amon Carter Museum of American Art, the Canadian Museum of History, the Confederation Centre of the Arts, the Dennos Museum Center, the National Gallery of Canada, the Red Deer and District Museum and Archives, the Royal Ontario Museum, the Simon Fraser Gallery, the Museum of Anthropology at UBC, the Montreal Museum of Fine Arts, the Museum London, the Textile Museum of Canada, the Canada Council Art Bank, the University of Michigan Museum of Art, the RISD Museum, and the Winnipeg Art Gallery.

== Later life ==
She was married to the carver and graphic artist Pudlat Pootoogook (1919–1985). Her daughter Sarah Putuguk is a printmaker, and her adopted son Elijah Pootoogook is a graphic artist and carver. She was also the sister-in-law to artist Kananginak Pootoogook.
