= Abraham Anghik Ruben =

Inuvialuk Canadian sculptor (born 1951)

Abraham Anghik Ruben OC
- Born: November 26, 1951 (age 74); Paulatuk, Northwest Territories
- Known for: Visual arts, stone sculpture
- Website: abrahamruben.com

Abraham Anghik Ruben OC (born 1951) is an Inuvialuk Canadian sculptor of Yup'ik descent. Ruben was born south of the hamlet of Paulatuk in the Inuvik Region east of the Mackenzie River Delta in the Northwest Territories, Canada in 1951.

He was inducted into the Order of Canada on November 17, 2016. Ruben now lives and works on Saltspring Island, British Columbia.

== Ancestry ==
Ruben's mother, Bertha (Thrasher) Ruben, was Yup'ik and of Portuguese-African descent from Alaska. Ruben's maternal great-grandparents, Apakark and Kagun, were Yup'ik Alaskan shamans from the Bering Sea region. (Note: Ruben honoured Apakark and Kagun in his sculpture Journey to the Underworld (plate 14).) When the American whaling ships left, Apakark and Kagun moved to the Inuvik Region, along with the families of Ruben's paternal grandfather Ruben Anghik and maternal grandfather Billy Thrasher.

Fifteen of Bertha Ruben's sixteen children survived, which is a very high survival rate in the Arctic. Bertha raised the children as Christians. She was a storyteller and also kept traditional teachings alive. Like most Inuit women, she was a seamstress.

The children's father, William Ruben, also known as Billy Ruben, was named Esoktak in the Inukitut language. He had Yup'ik and Irish-American ancestors.

== Early life ==
Ruben's world in the 1950s in Inuvialuit lands

Ruben was born on November 26, 1951, at his family's winter camp, which was located at the old Catholic coal mine, about 35 miles southeast of Paulatuk. The rich vein of coal in the Paulatuk region had been used as fuel by the Inuit, then American whalers and missionaries, who set up their mission in 1938. Until 1959, Ruben lived the traditional semi-nomadic Inuvialuit lifestyle with a "small band of 10-15 families." They moved among seasonal fishing and hunting camps, and most of their diet consisted of caribou, moose, muskox, game birds, waterfowl, and sea mammals. In 1955, when Ruben was four years old, his older brother, David Ruben Piqtoukun, who was five, and their older sister Martha, were the first of the 14 siblings to be sent to the residential school in Aklavik. David and Martha did not see their family again until 1958. Ruben represented this traumatic 1955 experience through his mother's eyes in his 2001 sculpture entitled The Last Goodbye.

In 1959, Ruben, then 8, his siblings, and cousins were sent to the residential school, Grollier Hall, in Inuvik. He lived there for the next eleven years, until 1970.

== Career ==
In the summer of 1971 Ruben began his formal studies in art under the guidance of Ronald (Ron) Senungetuk, an Iñupiaq artist and art educator, who was head of the Native Arts Centre at the University of Alaska Fairbanks. At the university's Centre he "developed the understanding of how to combine traditional material and techniques with the contemporaneous interpretations of many myths and legends." Ruben returned for a full year to study under Senungetuk from the summer of 1974 to the summer of 1975. Ruben pursued his artistic career over the next ten years.

Ruben met Toronto-based artist and art dealer and owner of the Pollock Gallery, Jack Pollock and Eva Quan in the 1970s. They introduced his work to the Toronto art scene over the next five years. Ruben's first solo exhibitions were held in The Pollock Gallery in 1977, 1978, 1979 and 1980. Pollock described Ruben as a contemporary sculptor with Inuit ancestry".

In 1989 Darlene Coward Wight, curator of Inuit art at the Winnipeg Art Gallery and a leading Inuit art scholar, curated "Out of Tradition" an exhibition by Abraham Anghik and his brother David Ruben Piqtoukun. She accompanied a "scaled-down version" of the exhibition across Canada's north for months.

Ruben works with a wide variety of materials including stone and bronze. His art work reflects and honours the traditional teachings of his Inuvialuit family and friends.

After surviving cancer in late 2004, Ruben's sculpture reflected his interest in the Inuit/Norse Viking "contact period from the early 900s to the 1400s" long before Europeans arrived in North America. In his biography, Ruben described how he was partly inspired by the story of his maternal aunt, Paniabuluk, who became the Inuk wife of Arctic explorer Vilhjalmur Stefansson and who assisted him on many of his expeditions. In the early 20th century other Nordic visitors overwintered in Ruben's ancestral lands. Since then, Ruben has researched the "cultures of the circumpolar world, including those of Siberia, Scandinavia, Greenland and Iceland" and found resonance between Inuit narratives and myths which is expressed through his art.

In Shaman Beckoning Spirits which was included in the 2010 exhibition "Sanaugavut: Inuit Art from the Canadian Arctic" in Delhi, India, curated by the National Gallery of Canada's Christine Lalonde, Ruben represented how "Christianity changed the status of the Shaman, reducing once powerful leaders to beggars."

Ruben works with a wide variety of materials including whalebone, narwal tusk, "soapstone from British Columbia, Oregon, Brazil and South Africa; alabaster from Utah, Portugal and Italy, Italian Carrara marble" and bronze. Some of his largest pieces weigh tons. He incorporates "images and themes from diverse northern cultures, including Viking and Norse." Since 2007, Ruben has been represented by the Kipling Gallery in Woodbridge, Ontario run by two Italian Canadian owners, Rocco Pannese and Lou Ruffolo, who opened their gallery in 2004. In 2008, they hosted the 2008 exhibition "Abraham Anghik Ruben: Myths, Stories, Legends" with an illustrated catalogue, and another solo exhibition in 2009.

On Saltspring Island Ruben "lives on ten acres and typically works on five to ten pieces at a time. One work in progress [in 2016] weigh[ed] four tons and is a limestone piece representing a mother bear and two cubs."

== Documentary ==
A half-hour documentary on Ruben was produced in 2007 as part of the 26-part series entitled "From the Spirit".

== Exhibitions ==
He had a solo show in the Bayard Gallery, New York in 1980 and another in Vancouver in 1981, "Images for a Canadian Heritage." In the 1990s he had solo exhibitions in Santa Fe and again in New York as well as a 1994 exhibition, "Abraham Anghik: Works in Bronze" at the Isaacs/Innuit Gallery in Toronto. In the 2000s, along with a 2001–2002 solo exhibition curated by Darlene Coward Wight at the Winnipeg Art Gallery which included a catalogue, he had three solos exhibitions in Idaho, "The Art of Abraham Anghik Ruben" was featured at the Appleton Galleries in Vancouver, BC. "In 2010 "Abraham Anghik Ruben: Shaman's Dreams" was held at the Art Gallery of Mississauga with an illustrated catalogue and in 2012 he had a solo exhibition at the Hazelton Fine Art Gallery, Toronto.

In 2012, the exhibition of 23 "massive" sculptures, "Arctic Journeys/Ancient Memories: The Sculpture of Abraham Anghik Ruben" was organized by the Arctic Studies Center, National Museum of Natural History and the National Museum of the American Indian. It was shown at the Smithsonian's National Museum of the American Indian from October 2012 through January 2013 and was viewed by over 500,000 visitors. The exhibition took place concurrently with the 18th Inuit Studies Conference. His sculptures refer to Viking Norse and Inuit stories and myths. In association with the Kipling Gallery, the exhibition was then hosted by the Art Gallery of Algoma, Sault Ste. Marie, Ontario until September 2013.

From May to September 2014, the Rockwell Museum of Western Art in New York, a Smithsonian affiliate, hosted "The World of Man, Animals and Spirits: A Personal Interpretation" which includes about twenty sculptures in soapstone and bronze in which Ruben "contrasts the ancient lives of two northern peoples-Norse adventurers and Inuit (Inuvialuit) whale hunters-guiding us to a new perspective on the complex history of the North American Arctic, a history shaped by movement, contact, and change".

In 2014–2015 his solo exhibition, Abraham Anghik Ruben "Moving Forward: Breaking Through" was shown at the Museum Cerny Inuit Collection, Bern, Switzerland. on the theme of migration—specifically between the Inuit and the Vikings who "shared similar points of view".

In 2015–2016, "Aurora Borealis: Abraham Anghik Ruben" was shown at Prince of Wales Northern Heritage Centre, Yellowknife, NT.

Three bronze pieces were in the Société Nationale des Beaux-Arts (SNBA) show in the Louvre, Paris.

In 2018, works by Ruben and his brother Piqtoukun were featured in the "newly-renovated, reinstalled and renamed" Art Gallery of Ontario's J. S. McLean Centre for Indigenous & Canadian Art.

In 2026, the Winnipeg Art Gallery exhibited more than 100 artworks including sculptures and paintings produced from 1975 to 2025 but placed them in context of important events in his life as well as Inuit myths and legends.

== Major collections ==
His work is in permanent collections of the dozens of public art galleries and museums including the Smithsonian's National Museum of the American Indian, the National Gallery of Canada, Canadian Museum of Civilization, Ottawa, the Art Gallery of Ontario, the Winnipeg Art Gallery, and the Museum Cerny Inuit Collection, Bern Switzerland. (Note: Abraham Anghik Ruben. The Hunter and the Seamstress, 2001. Stone, 204.1 kg, 105.4 × 62.2 cm © Abraham Anghik Ruben AGO.119039)

== Awards and honours ==
Ruben was appointed an Officer of the Order of Canada on November 17, 2016, for his artistic contributions and for his preservation of Inuvialuit culture.

== Personal life ==
Since 1986, Ruben has lived on Saltspring Island, British Columbia, with his wife, Patricia Donnelly. Their son Timothy was born in 1987.
