= Siasi Atitu =

Canadian Inuk printmaker

- Born: c. 1896; Ivujivik, Quebec, Canada
- Died: 1983 (aged 86–87); Quebec, Canada
- Years active: 1961–1983
- Known for: Printmaking
- Style: Inuit art
- Spouse: Adam Amamartua
- Children: 10

Siasi Atitu (c. 1896–1983) was a Canadian Inuk artist known for her stonecut printmaking. She was active in the 1960s. And had many variations of name including Siasi Atitu Pamiu.

== About ==
Siasi Atitu was born in 1896 in Ivujivik, Quebec, Canada. She later moved to the Puvirnituq settlement when she was married to Adam Amamartua, the settlement leader. With her husband, they raised ten children.

In 1961, Atitu was in her 60s, when she learned printmaking in the Puvirnituq settlement. Her subject matter for her printmaking imagery was different from the others, with murder scenes, cannibalism and more. Her work has a unique visual perspective, which appears to have been created in consideration of the edges of the stone used in the stone cutting process. Atitu's art works can be found in the permanent collection at Canadian Museum of History. The University of Alberta Art Collection and at the non-profit Avataq Cultural Institute in Quebec.

She died in 1983 in Quebec, Canada. Her son, Adamie Suppaki Amamartua (born 1930) is a known sculptor.
