= Sheouak Petaulassie =

Inuk printmaker from Cape Dorset, Northwest Territories, Canada (1918-1961)

- Born: 1918
- Died: 1961 (aged 42–43) near the Itilliarjuk camp in Nunavut
- Other names: Sheouak; Sheowa Sheouak; Sheowak Sheouak; Sheoak Sheouak
- Known for: printmaking

Sheouak Parr Petaulassie (1918-1961) was an Inuk printmaker.

== Early life ==
She grew up in the Kinngait (Cape Dorset) area.

== Career ==
James Houston chose ten of her prints for inclusion in the 1960 and 1961 print collections of the West Baffin Eskimo Co-Operative, which she was involved with.

She died of influenza in 1961 near the Itilliarjuk camp in Nunavut.

Her work is held in several museums, including the National Gallery of Canada, the Canadian Museum of Civilization, the Glenbow Museum, the Hood Museum of Art, the Museum of Anthropology at UBC, the University of Michigan Museum of Art, the Art Institute of Chicago, and the Art Gallery of Windsor.

== Personal life ==
She and Agiak Petaulassie (an Anglican minister) had six children, including the artist Mayureak Ashoona. Sheouak's granddaughter, Siassie Kenneally (1969–2018) was also an artist.

== Works ==
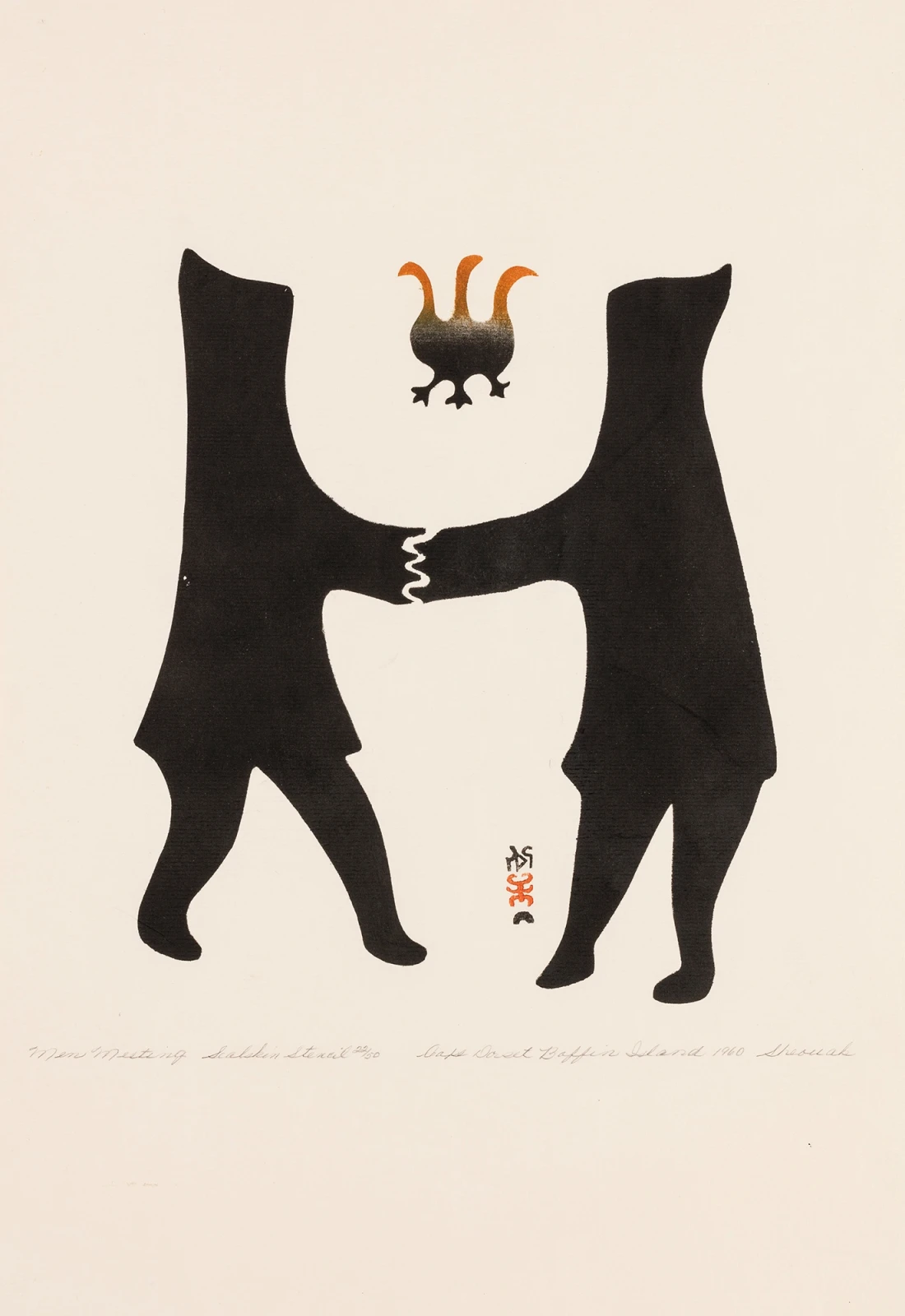
Men Meeting (1960)

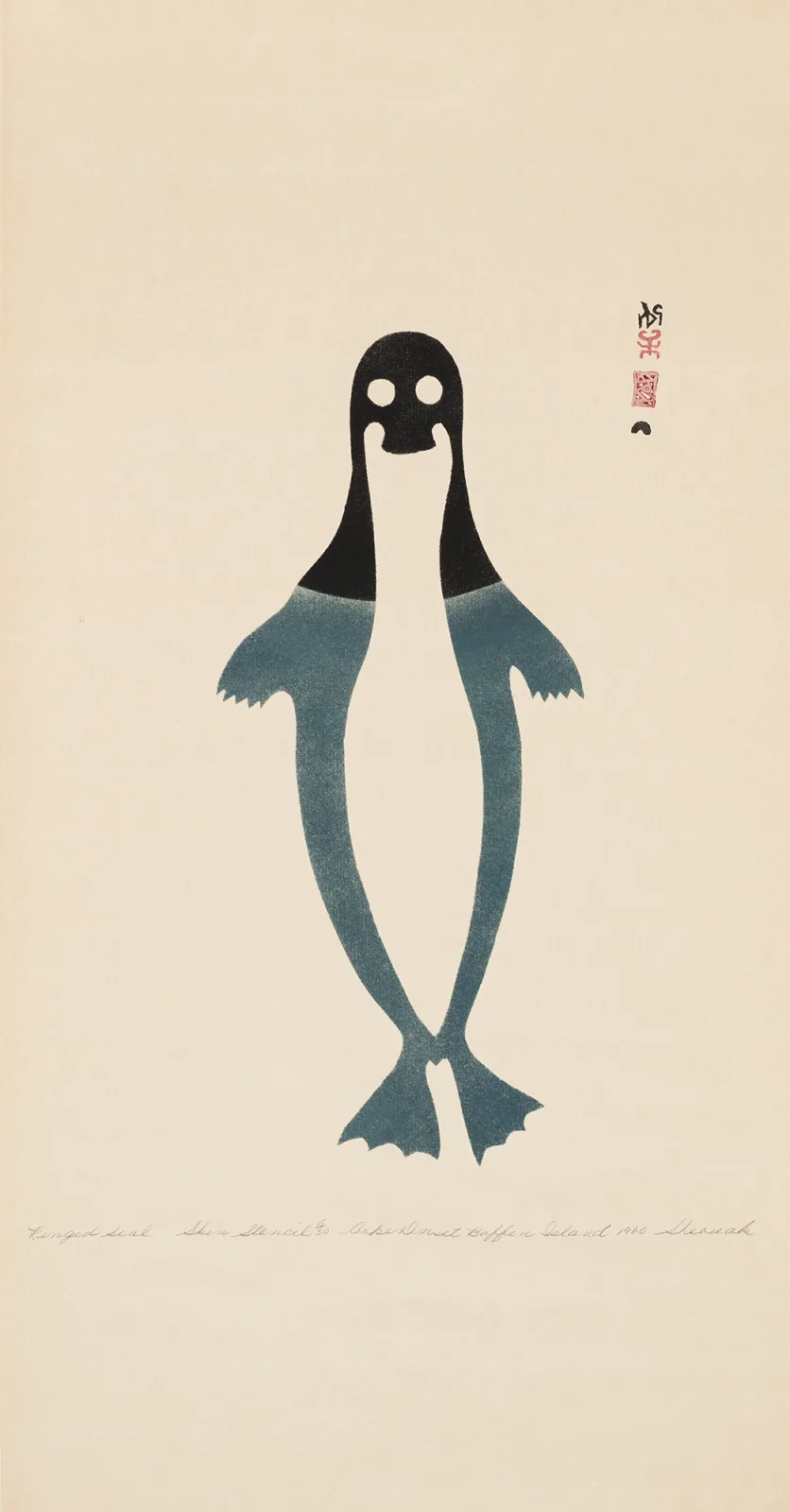
Ringed Seal (1960)

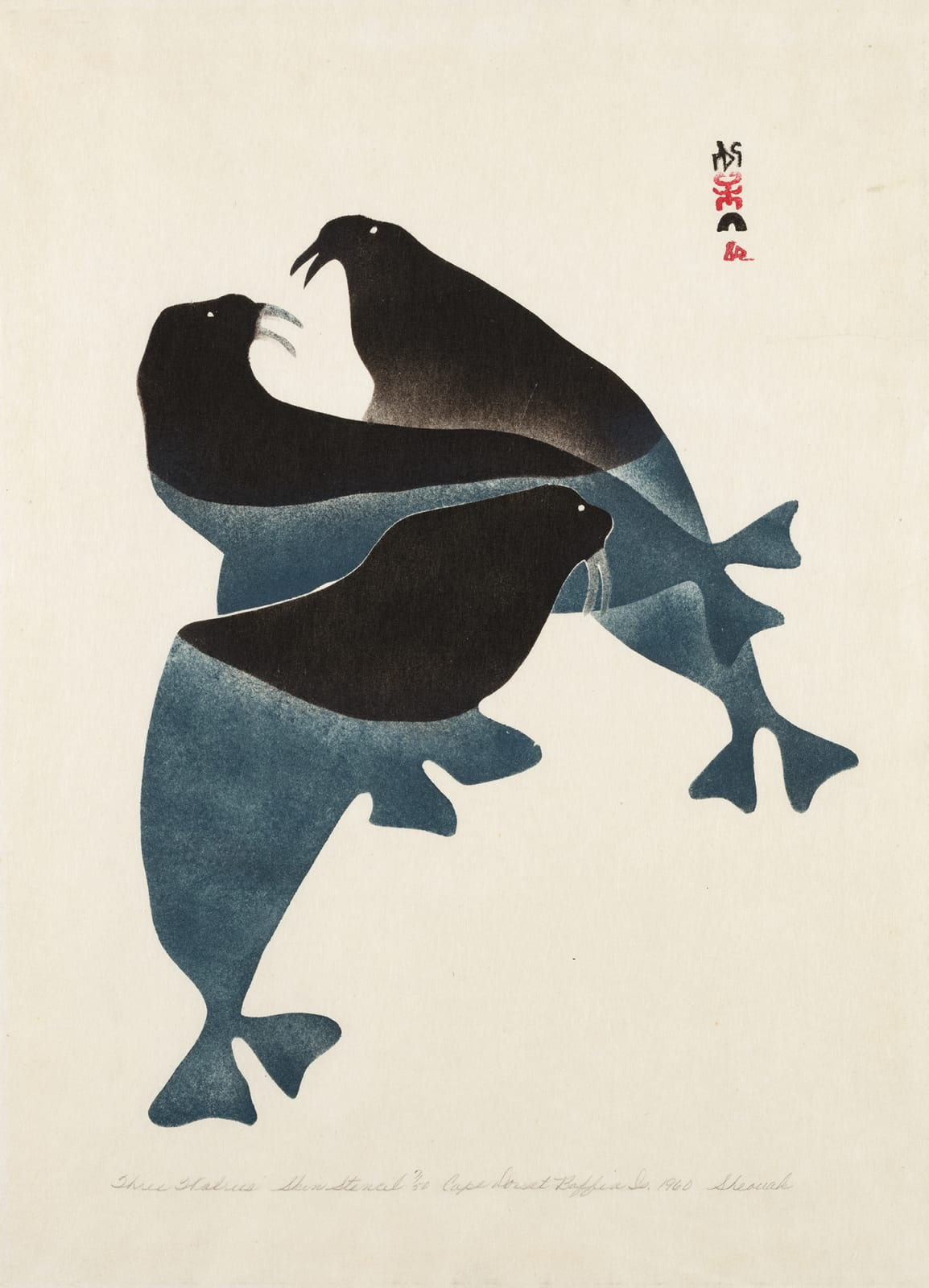
Three Walrus (1960)
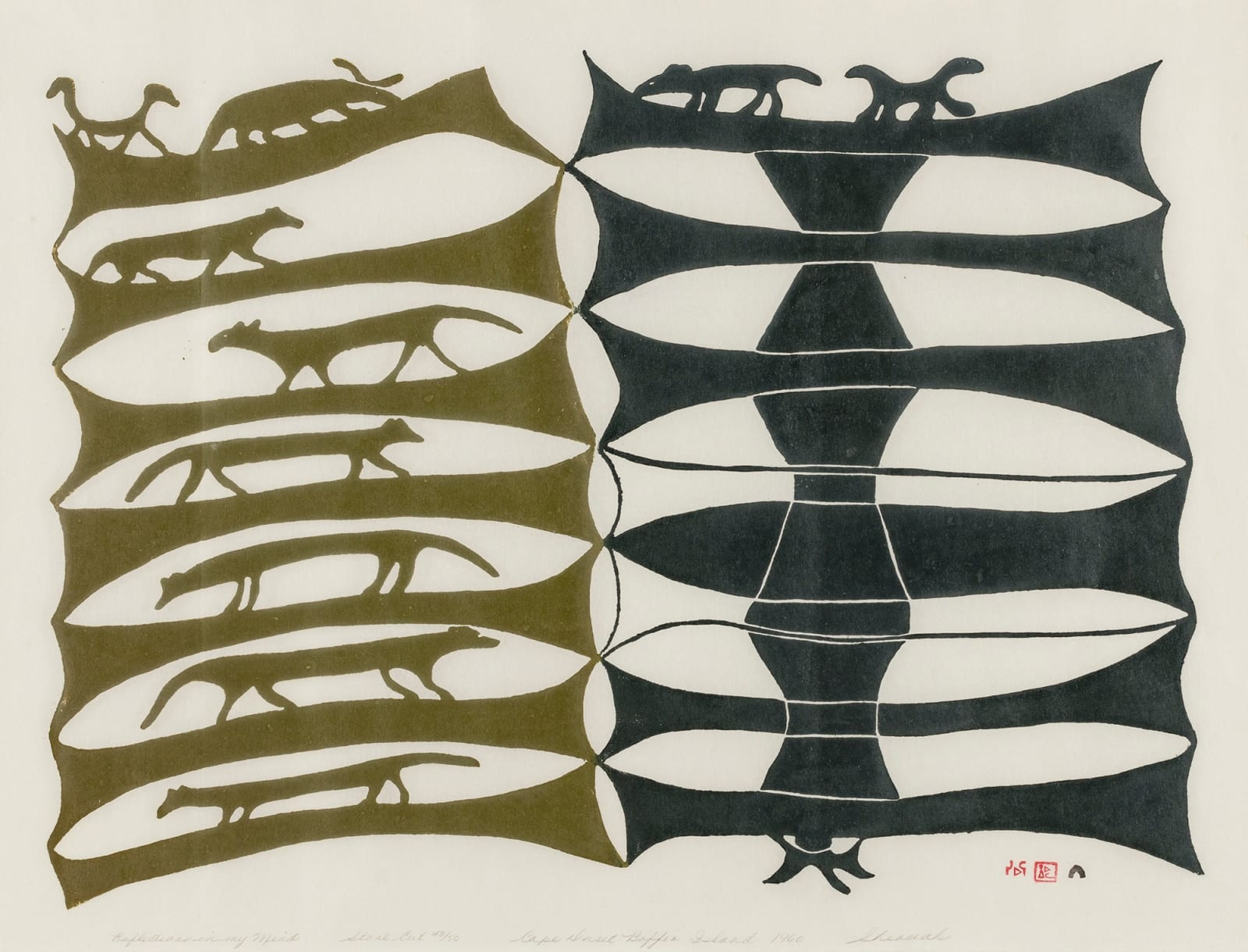
Reflections in My Mind (1960)

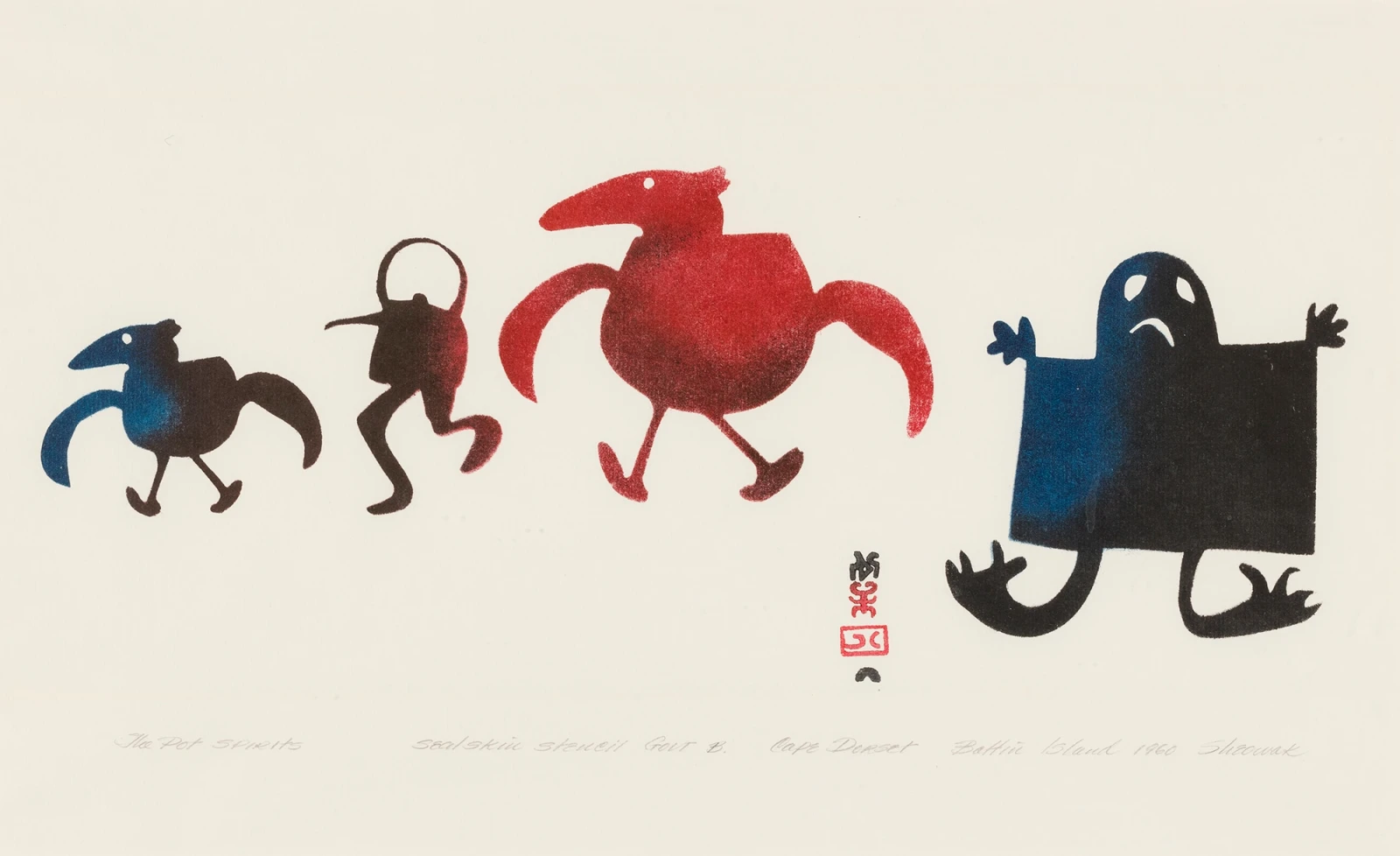
The Pot Spirits (1960)

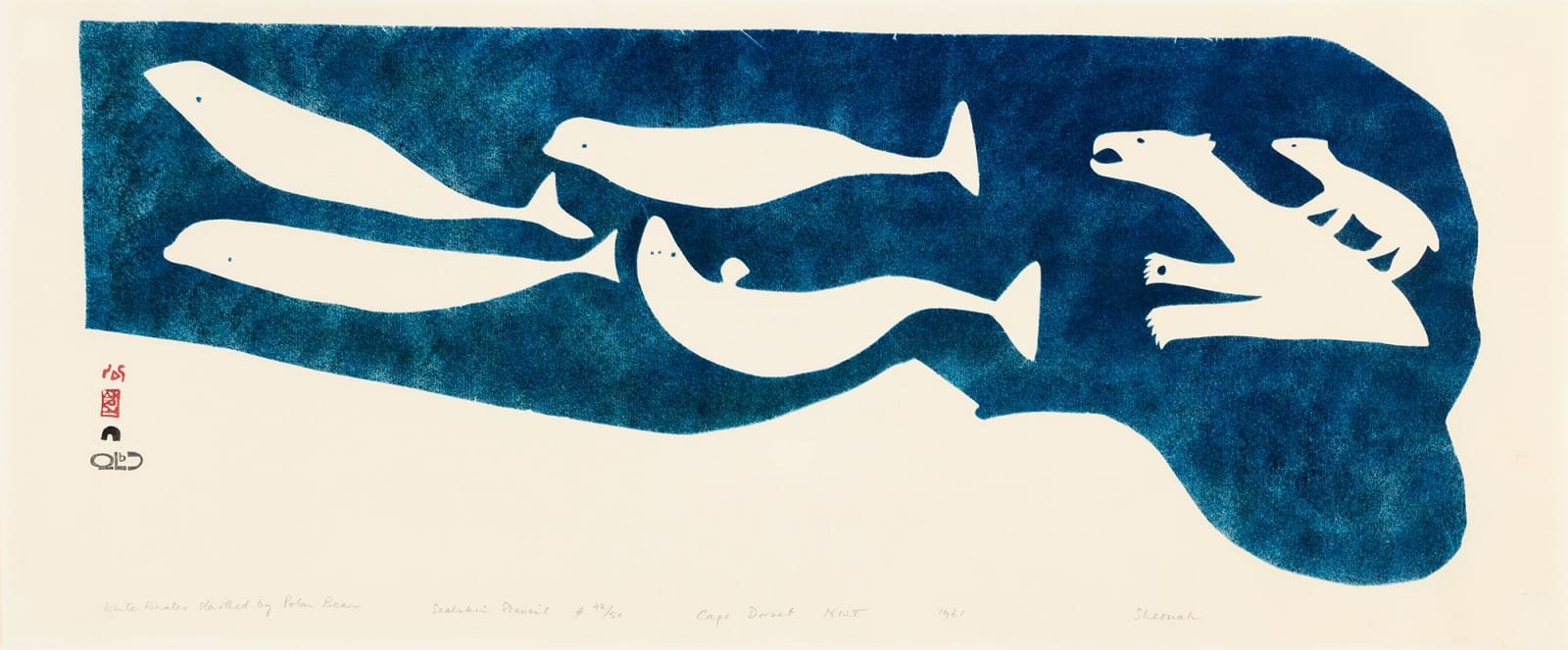
White Whales Startled by Bear (1961)
