= Elijah Pudlat Pootoogook =

Inuk artist (born 1943)

Elijah Pudlat Pootoogook (Inuktitut: ᐃᓓᔭ ᐳᓪᓚ), also known as Elijah Pootoogook, is an Inuk artist born on July 7, 1943, in Kinngait, Nunavut Emerging in the 1960s as a member of the West Baffin Eskimo Cooperative, his work was regularly featured in the annual catalog. Additionally, he contributed to the creation of a mural for Expo '67 in Montreal and demonstrated the creation of traditional Inuit sculptures at Expo '70 in Osaka, Japan. His works can be found in several museum collections.

== Family background ==
Elijah Pudlat Pootoogook comes from a family of artists. He was adopted by printmaker Sharnie Pootoogook (1922–2003) and her husband Pudlat (1919–1992), who was also a printmaker and graphic artist. His sister, Sarah Putuguk, followed in their mother's footsteps as a printmaker.

Elijah married Iqarlik (born 1949), a sculptor and graphic artist. Together they had two children.

== Artistic techniques ==
Throughout his career, Elijah experimented with various artistic mediums, including drawing, engraving, sculpture, printmaking, and charcoal.

In the 1970s, American artist and typographer Wilfred Hudson (1928–2014) introduced Elijah, along with other artists such as Annie Pootoogook, Jimmy Manning, and Tukiki Manomee, to typography.

== Themes ==
Elijah Pootoogook's work reflects traditional Inuit culture, depicting daily activities such as hunting, dog sledding, and igloo construction. Much of his graphic work highlights the diverse birds in the Arctic due to migration patterns, while his sculptures often portray whales, caribou, and sea lions.

== Major works ==
One of Elijah Pootoogook's most significant collaborations was with Kumakuluk Saggiak on the mural "Le Monde Polaire", showcased at Expo '67 in Montreal. This plaster mural illustrated various aspects of Inuit life. Some parts of the mural have since been incorporated into the architecture of La Toundra Hall at Jean-Drapeau Park, Montreal.

== Recognition ==
While working with Kumakuluk Saggiak on the Expo '67 mural in Montreal, their experience was documented in a National Film Board of Canada (NFB) short film by David Millar. The film, titled "Aki'name" ("On the Wall"), highlighted their creative process and daily life in Montreal.

In 1970, the Canadian government invited Elijah and three other Inuit artists to represent Inuit art at Expo '70 in Japan. Elijah traveled to Japan with his wife Iqarlik and their two children for a six-month residency, where he demonstrated Inuit sculpture techniques at the Canadian Pavilion.

== Museum collections ==
Elijah Pootoogook's work is part of the following collections:

Museum	Location
Dennos Museum Centre	Traverse City, Michigan
Canadian Museum of History	Hull, QC
Montreal Museum of Fine Arts	Montreal, QC
National Gallery of Canada	Ottawa, ON

== Significance and legacy ==
For many years, Elijah contributed to the annual print catalogs of the West Baffin Eskimo Cooperative, known as Kinngait Cooperative. This community-based art studio is one of Canada's oldest, playing a key role in promoting Inuit art and supporting local artists.

Elijah's participation in Expo '67 and Expo '70 helped bring attention to Inuit art, both at home and abroad.

Today, his works are preserved in leading Canadian museums such as the National Gallery of Canada and the Montreal Museum of Fine Arts.
