= Manasie Akpaliapik =

Canadian Inuk sculptor (born 1955)

- Born: 1955 (age 70–71)
- Known for: Sculpture (whalebone, ivory, stone)
- Website: manasie.com

Manasie Akpaliapik (born 1955) is a Canadian Inuk sculptor.

Akpaliapik was born in a hunting camp on Baffin Island, Nunavut, and moved with his family to Ikpiarjuk (Arctic Bay) in 1967. Though his parents were sculptors, he learned to carve at age ten by observing his grandparents.

At age 12 he was sent to residential school in Iqaluit where his language and culture were suppressed. Akpaliapik left residential school at 16 years old.

Akpaliapik married a woman named Noodloo and returned to Arctic Bay with his family. His wife and their two children were killed in a fire in 1980, after which Akpaliapik moved to Montreal and subsequently to Toronto.

== Work ==
Akpaliapik sculpts with bone, ivory, and stone. His sculptures typically have human or animal forms and are closely connected with traditional beliefs. He began to carve professionally after 1980.

On his work, he says:

Everything that I'm doing is trying to capture some of the culture, about my traditions, simple things like hunting, wearing traditional clothing, harpoons, using legends. I feel that the only way we can preserve the culture is if people can see it.

In 1989, he received a Canada Council of the Arts grant to study certain aspects of Inuit culture, including drumming and kayak making, for his project North Baffin Island Legends. He also delivers workshops about Inuit art.

Akpaliapik was long-listed for the Kenojuak Ashevak Memorial Award in 2023.

== Exhibitions and collections ==
Akpaliapik's works are in included in the collection of the National Gallery of Canada in Ottawa, Musée national des beaux-arts du Québec and the Art Gallery of Ontario in Toronto.

In 2017, the Art Gallery of Ontario held a solo exhibition of his work.

In 2021 the Musée national des beaux-arts du Québec held Manasie Akpaliapik Inuit Universe with works from the collection of Raymond Brousseau, the first time it devoted an exhibition to a single Inuk artist.

In 2024 Montreal's McCord Stewart Museum reprised and expanded upon the 2021 exhibition, called Manasie Akpaliapik, Inuit Universe.
