= Raymond Brousseau =

Canadian film director and art collector(1938–2021)

- Born: 11 February 1938; Montreal, Quebec, Canada
- Died: 4 July 2021 (aged 83); Quebec City, Quebec, Canada
- Occupations: Art collector, dealer, film director, screenwriter
- Years active: 1963-2021
- Known for: Inuit art collection and museum
- Awards: Knight of the French National Order of Merit (2005), Knight of the Ordre national du Québec (2008)

Raymond Brousseau (11 February 1938 - 4 July 2021) was a Canadian art collector, dealer, and promoter of Inuit art. He was an early figure in the introduction of Inuit art to international audiences. He amassed a collection of over 2,600 pieces. He founded the Musée d'art Inuit Brousseau, the first museum in North America dedicated exclusively to Inuit art and culture, and his donations established the Musée national des beaux-arts du Québec as a major repository of contemporary Inuit sculpture. His contributions to the preservation and promotion of Inuit art earned him recognition from both France and Quebec, including a knighthood from the French National Order of Merit in 2005 and membership in the Ordre national du Québec in 2008. Before his career in art, Brousseau worked as a film director for the National Film Board of Canada.

== Early life and education ==
Brousseau was born in Montreal in 1938. He began his career as a geometry teacher in 1963. Starting in 1956, he developed an interest in Inuit art, beginning a collection that would span decades.

== Art collection and legacy ==
=== Early collecting (1956-1974) ===
Brousseau's interest in Inuit art began in 1956, while still working as a geometry teacher and he began systematically collecting Inuit sculpture and drawings. In 1974, he transitioned from his career as a filmmaker to become an art dealer, opening "Aux Multiples Collections," marking the beginning of his commercial engagement with Inuit art.

=== Commercial galleries (1974-1999) ===
After opening Aux Multiples Collections, Brousseau subsequently opened galleries in 1986 and 1992, including the Galerie d'art Inuit Brousseau et Brousseau, specializing in Inuit art. Through these galleries, Brousseau developed contacts with Inuit artists and their village representatives, accumulating expertise in the artistic, stylistic, and ethnographic aspects of the art form. For his personal collection, he retained only pieces he judged to be major works within an artist's production, region, technique, or period.

=== Musée d'art Inuit Brousseau ===
Around 1985, Brousseau and his wife Lyse, a museum professional, began planning a dedicated museum for Inuit art. After purchasing gallery space in 1995 at the Maisons Beaucourt in Vieux-Québec, the Musée d'art Inuit Brousseau officially opened on 1 May 1999. It was the first museum dedicated exclusively to Inuit art and culture, and it held the largest private collection of Inuit art in Canada.

Works from the Brousseau collection formed the basis of the traveling exhibition "Inuit: Quand la parole prend forme" (Inuit: When words take form), produced by the Muséum de Lyon in collaboration with the Musée d'art Inuit Brousseau. First shown in Lyon in 2002, it traveled to venues in France, including the Musée de l'Homme in Paris from December 2004 to March 2005. The accompanying catalogue was published in 2002.

=== Major donations and recognition (2005 onwards) ===
In 2005, Brousseau sold a portion of his collection to Hydro-Quebec for approximately 2.9 million dollars. He subsequently donated another portion to the Musée national des beaux-arts du Québec, which received 2,635 pieces of Inuit art from his collection, making it the museum's largest acquisition since 1933. In spring 2005, the collection was officially recognized as "of exceptional interest and national importance" by the Canadian Commission for Examination of Cultural Property Exports. Through these donations, the MNBAQ established itself as a major holder of contemporary Inuit art, now holding the world's largest collection of works by sculptor Manasie Akpaliapik. The collection was documented in a comprehensive exhibition guide published by the museum in 2016.

In 2005, Brousseau was made a Knight of the French National Order of Merit by President Jacques Chirac. In 2008, he was invested as a Knight of the Ordre national du Québec, Quebec's highest distinction.

== Film career ==
Brousseau worked as a film director and screenwriter throughout the 1970s and 1980s, creating documentary and experimental films, often working with the National Film Board of Canada. His 1970 film Dimension soleils illustrated mathematician Fernand Lemay's theory of infinite dimensions, presenting both an artistic work and mathematical essay. His 1971 experimental film All Stakes Are Down, No More Bets depicted contemporary life as a process of attrition, showing cars being sent to the wrecker's yard, buildings being demolished, and human existence as programmed obsolescence. His 1974 experimental fiction short film Sens devant derrière (Backwards) follows an ordinary man who wakes up in an inverted world where nothing is as it seems. His 1976 science-fiction fable Canadiens conformes explored the concept of difference through a story in which men become semi-robots through a photocopier, eventually liberating themselves from the work machine.

=== Filmography ===
Year	Title	Director	Writer
1970	Points de suspension	Yes	No
1970	Dimension soleils	Yes	No
1971	Présenter le pays aux gens d'ici et d'ailleurs	Yes	No
1971	All Stakes Are Down, No More Bets	Yes	No
1973	Quelques animaux raisonnables?	Yes	No
1974	Sens devant derrière	Yes	Yes
1974	Canadiens conformes	Yes	Yes
1980	A Québécois Rediscovered: Joseph Légaré 1795-1855	Yes	No

== Public collections ==
- Cinémathèque québécoise
- Musée d'art contemporain de Montréal
- Musée national des beaux-arts du Québec
