= Andy Miki =

Canadian Inuk artist (1918-1982)

Andy Miki (1918–1982) was an Inuk artist from Arviat, Northwest Territories (now Nunavut).

== Early life ==
Miki was born in 1918 near the Kazan River.

== Career ==
His works are mainly in soapstone, and are often geometric abstractions.

While the abstract work of John Pangnark focused on the human figure, Miki's work is minimalist abstracted animals. This is partly because the stone available near Arviat is hard and difficult to work with, which necessitates simple designs. Animals depicted in his work include arctic hares, caribou, polar bears, muskox, birds, and dogs.

His work is held by a variety of museums, including the University of Michigan Museum of Art, the Montreal Museum of Fine Arts, the Art Gallery of Guelph, the Canadian Museum of History, the Lowe Art Museum, the Montreal Museum of Fine Arts, and the Penn Museum.

His disc number was E1-436.

Miki died in December 1982.

== Works ==
- Mating Polar Bears, 1967. Sold for 27,600 dollars Canadian in 2006.
