= Isa Aupalukta =

Canadian artist (born 1942)

Isa (or Aisa) Aupalukta
- Born: December 31, 1942; Port Harrison / Inukjuak
- Died: 2018 (aged 75–76)
- Known for: Sculptor of stone

Isa Aupalukta (also known as Aisa Aupalukta) (December 31, 1942 - 2018) was a Canadian Inuit artist who sculpted mainly in stone. In his sculptures, he depicted games with children as well as doing his own versions on the hunting, figures of women or men, mothers and children, and legends, usually depicted by Inuit artists.

His work is frequently distinguished by detailed refinement and high gloss, as well as a simplified aesthetic using simple geometric volumes. The artist represented Canada at the La Federation des Cooperatives du Nouveau-Quebec (FCNQ) Canadian Trade Centre Exhibition in Japan in 1984. His work is carried by major dealers of Inuit art such as Feheley Fine Arts in Toronto and others.

== Selected exhibitions ==
- Artists of Arctic Quebec, Inuit Gallery of Vancouver, 1983;
- Inuit Art from Arctic Quebec, La Federation des Cooperatives du Nouveau-Quebec presented at the Canada Trade Centre; Tokyo, Japan, 1984
- Mother, Gallery Indigena, Stratford; Mother & Child, Marion Scott Gallery, Vancouver, 1987;
- The Art of the Eskimo, Newman Galleries, Philadelphia, 1989;
- Mother and Child: Sculpture and Prints, Albers Gallery, San Francisco, 1989;
- A Selection of Smaller Carvings, Eskimo Art Inc., Ann Arbor, Michigan, 1990;
- Traditions and Innovations in Inuit Art Sculpture in Stone, Images of the North, San Francisco, 1990;
- The Hudson’s Bay Company Collection of Inuit Art, Winnipeg Art Gallery, 1992;
- Kunstwerke der Inuit, Presented by CreARTion, Eppstein in conjunction with the annual meeting of the Association of Canadian Studies at the Hotel am Badersee, 1993, Granau, Germany;
- The Inuit Imagination, Winnipeg Art Gallery, 1993;
- Keeping Our Stories Alive: An Exhibition of the Art and Crafts from Dene and Inuit of Canada, Institute of American Indian Arts Museum, Santa Fe, 1995;

== Selected public collections ==
- Samuel and Esther Sarick Collection, Art Gallery of Ontario, Toronto, accession number 96/460;
- Winnipeg Art Gallery;
