= Dennos Museum Center =

Art museum, est. 1991 in Michigan

Coordinates: 44°45′53.0″N 85°35′15.9″W

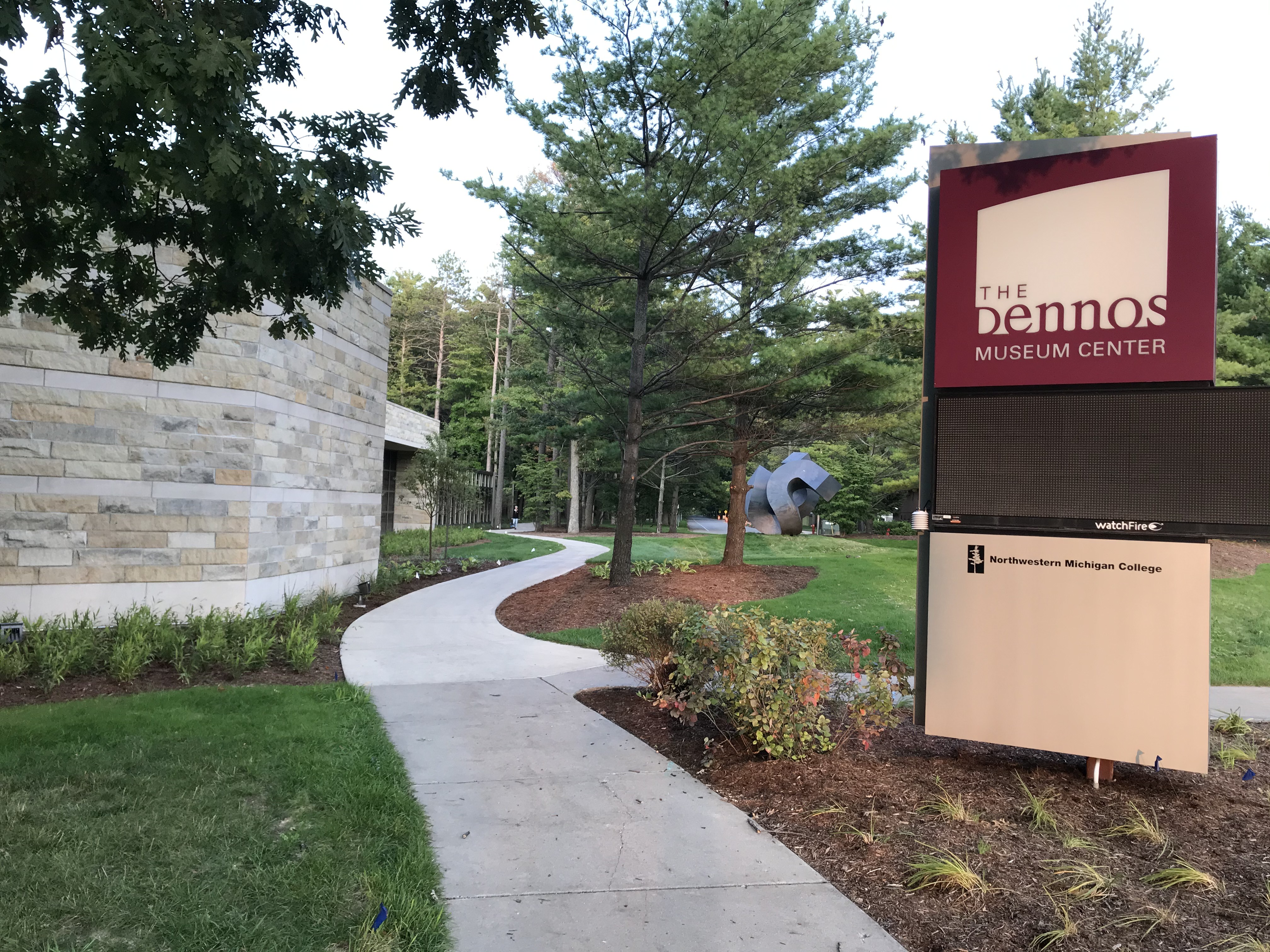

- Location within the United States
- Established: 1991
- Location: Northwestern Michigan College; 1410 College Drive; Traverse City, Michigan 49686
- Type: Art Museum
- Collections: Inuit art, Modern art, Contemporary art
- Collection size: 3,100
- Director: Craig Hadley
- Architect: Bob Holdeman
- Website: www.dennosmuseum.org

The Dennos Museum Center is a fine art museum and cultural center located in Traverse City, Michigan on the campus of Northwestern Michigan College (NMC). Most notable for its permanent collection of Inuit art, the Dennos Museum opened in 1991 and features rotating exhibitions of Modern and Contemporary art.

The museum consists of three changing exhibit galleries, a sculpture court, an Interactive Discovery Gallery for children and adults, and semi-permanent galleries for Inuit art and the museum's permanent collections. The museum has a permanent collection of 3,100 works, of which nearly 2,000 are Inuit art prints and sculptures. The museum is home to three temporary exhibition galleries that cover 8,000 square feet (740 m^{2}) combined with an additional 12,000 square feet of semi-permanent exhibition space for the museum's permanent collection.

As a cultural center, the Dennos Museum Center also provides exhibitions and programs in the sciences and performing arts. It includes the Milliken Auditorium, a 367-seat concert hall that hosts an annual concert series emphasizing world, jazz and blues music along with NMC and community events. The museum also oversees a collection of 14 outdoor sculptures by international and Michigan artists on the grounds of the college campus. In 2000, the museum was recognized by ArtServe Michigan with the Governor's Award for Arts and Culture.

== History ==
=== Formation ===
The Inuit art collection was started in 1960 by Northwestern Michigan College librarian Bernie Rink, who began collecting sculptures and prints for a library exhibition fundraiser. Rink organized the event as an annual sale of Canadian Inuit Art. Many of the items sold by Rink were prints. He retained some of the items each year, both prints and sculptures, resulting in the gradual growth of the Inuit art collection to 500 pieces by 1991, and 1500 pieces by 2015.

A need for an art collection and cultural center in Traverse City was identified in the 1980s. Barbara and husband Michael Dennos, then an executive with Chef Pierre (Sarah Lee Corporation), were both instrumental in the formation and funding of the museum.

In 1988, founding director Eugene Jenneman was hired by Northwestern Michigan College to work with architect Bob Holdeman to design and oversee the building of the museum. After a $6.5-million community campaign, the museum, named for Michael and Barbara Dennos, was opened in July 1991. The Barbara and Michael Dennos Museum Center was one of the first collections of Inuit art open to the public in the United States.

The Dennos Museum Center building, designed by Holdeman, includes the 367-seat Milliken Auditorium, home to a concert and lecture series, educational events, and other programming.

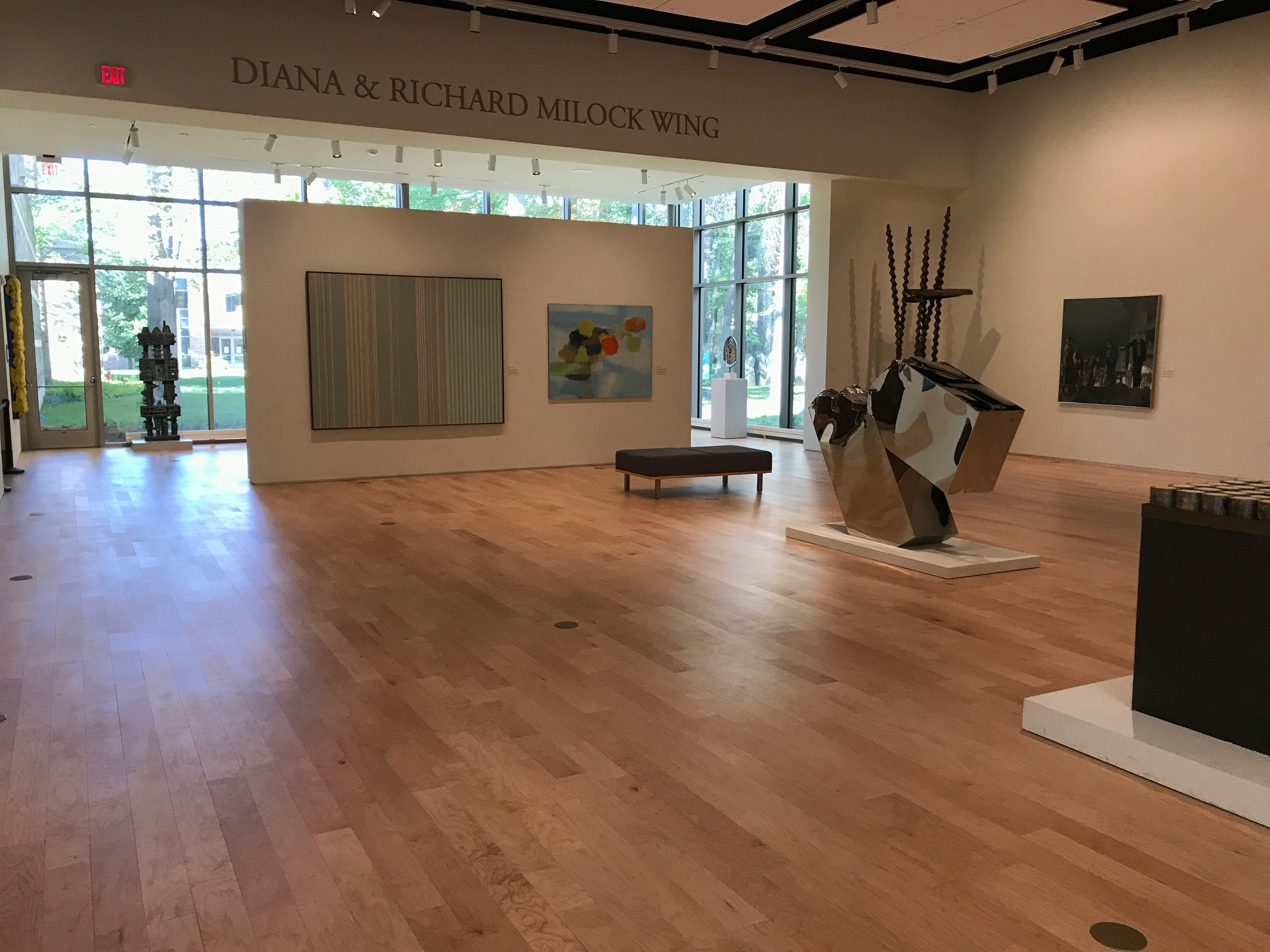
expanded Dennos Museum, 2020

=== Expansion ===
Following fundraising efforts which began in 2015, the museum received significant funds from local benefactors, including a $1 million gift from Barbara and Dudley Smith for the Inuit art gallery expansion and a $2 million gift from Diana and Richard Milock, the museum expanded its Inuit Gallery and added an additional 10,000 square feet of semi-permanent exhibition space as part of a $5 million building expansion that opened in 2018. The addition for the Inuit Collection was named the Barbara and Dudley Smith Wing for Inuit Art.

== Collections ==
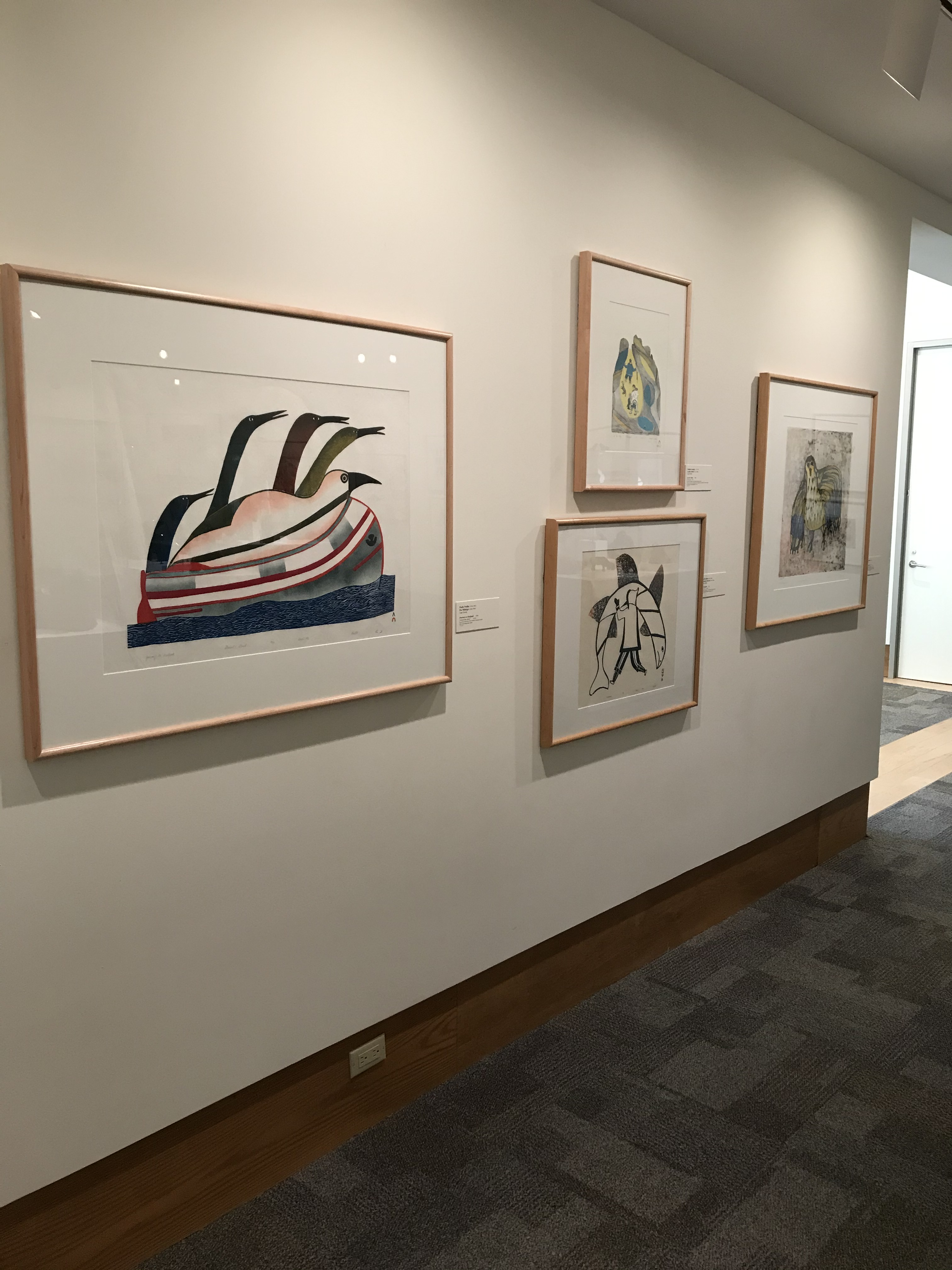
Inuit art wing of the Dennos Museum

The Dennos Museum established one of the first public collections in the United States of Inuit Art of the Canadian Arctic. The majority of works in the permanent collection are from Inuit of the Canadian Arctic, Greenland, and Alaska. The museum also holds a collection of works by Canadian artists associated with the Woodlands style including Norval Morrisseau and Carl Ray, as well as works by key Michigan contemporary artists such as Charles McGee.

Notable Inuit artists in the Dennos Museum's collection include:

- Kenojuak Ashevak
- Pitseolak Ashoona
- Kananginak Pootoogook

- Pudlo Pudlat
- Judas Ullulaq
- Jessie Oonark

- David Ruben Piqtoukun
- Abraham Anghik Ruben
- Annie Pootoogook

- Ningeokuluk Teevee
- Shuvanai Ashoona

The museum also oversees the care of fourteen large-scale outdoor sculptures on the grounds of Northwestern Michigan College which includes works by Hanna Stiebel and Clement Meadmore.

In 2021, the museum began providing access to part of the collection via an online database that contains images of approximately 800 Inuit works on paper.

== Management ==
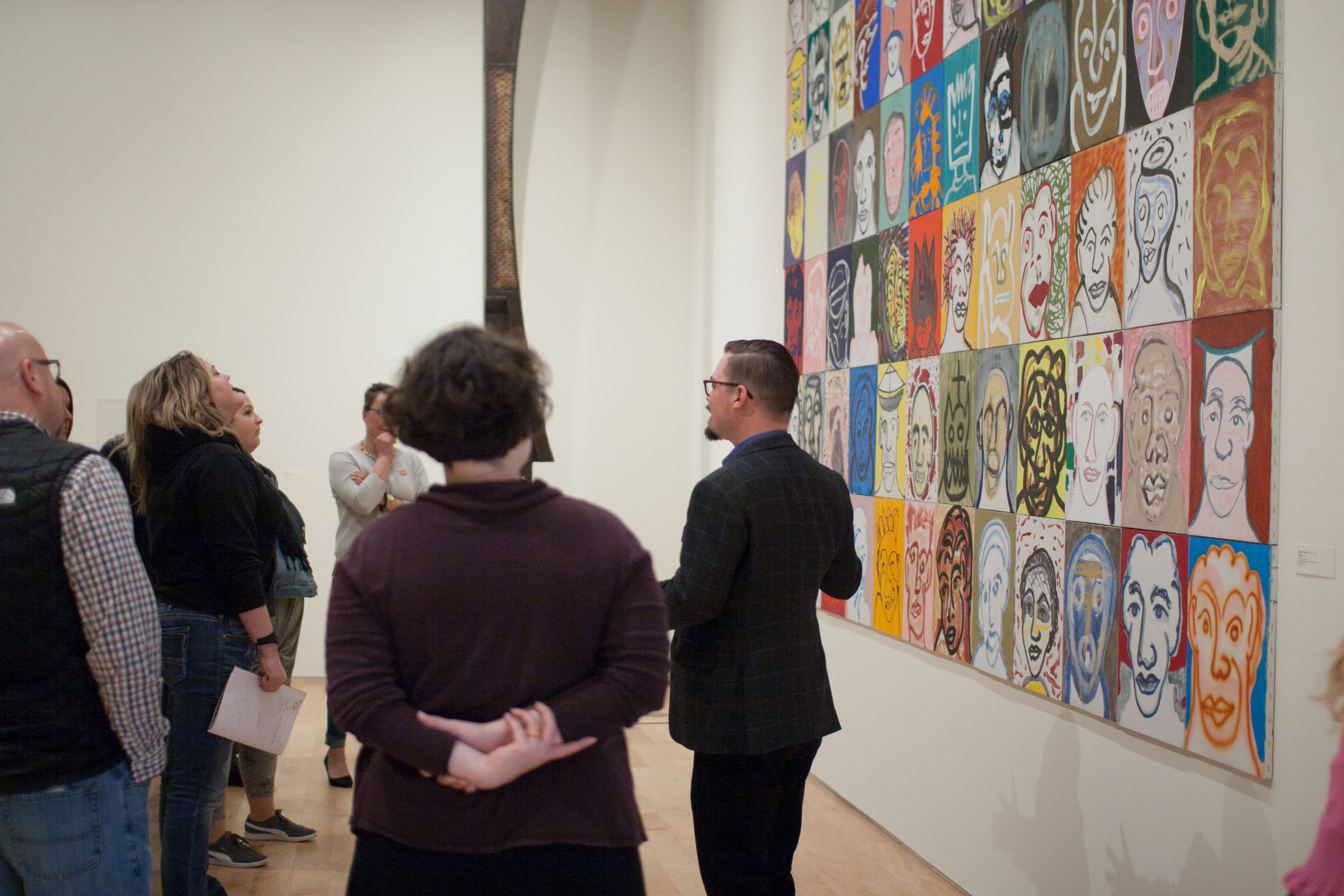
Adult tour at the Dennos Museum

The museum is led by executive director Craig Hadley, former curator of the art museum at DePauw University in Indiana, who took the reins in late 2019. Hadley succeeded Eugene Jenneman, the museum's founding executive director, who was hired by the college in 1988 to help finalize the museum's design and construction and oversaw several major expansions during his 27-year tenure.

In 2021, the museum began to pursue museum accreditation from the American Alliance of Museums (a several year process) by publishing a board approved mission statement expressing that the museum “builds community, sparks conversation, and inspires change for audiences of all ages through its exhibitions, programs, and the collection and preservation of art.
