= John Tiktak =

Canadian Inuk sculptor (1916-1981)

- ᔭᓐ ᑎᑕ
- Born: 1916; Kareak camp on the west coast of Hudson Bay
- Died: 1981
- Occupation: Sculptor

John Tiktak (Inuktitut syllabics: ᔭᓐ ᑎᑕ ) was a Canadian Inuk sculptor known for his minimalist and figurative work. He was born in 1916 at a camp near the western coast of Hudson Bay, in what is now Nunavut. He lived a traditional Inuit lifestyle before moving to Arviat (formerly known as Eskimo Point) in the 1950s. In 1958, he relocated to Rankin Inlet, where he began working as a sculptor in 1963.

Tiktak’s sculptures primarily focus on human figures, often characterized by rounded shapes and simplified forms. His work has been recognized for its unique approach, blending traditional Inuit themes with a modern artistic style.

== Biography ==
Tiktak lived a traditional Inuit lifestyle until he moved to Arviat (then known as Eskimo Point and also called Aqviat) in the 1950s. He moved to Rankin Inlet (also known as Kangiqilniq) in 1958, where he began to work as a sculptor in 1963.

His figurative work is minimal in style, and so is modern in appearance. Distinctive stylistic traits include very rounded forms and hands that are attached to the sides of the figure, so that the arms are circular in shape.

== Honors ==
- Elected a member of the Royal Canadian Academy of Arts, 1973
