= Mayureak Ashoona =

Canadian Inuk artist (born 1946)

- Born: Mayureak Petaulassie; September 27, 1946 (age 80)
- Other names: Mayoriak Ashoona, Mayoreak Ashoona
- Occupation: Artist
- Spouse: Kaka Ashoona (m. 1964; death 1996)
- Parents: Agiak Petaulassie (father); Sheouak Parr (mother)

Mayureak Ashoona (née Mayureak Petaulassie; born September 27, 1946) is an Inuk artist, known for her works on paper.

In 2010, she participated in the exhibition Nipirasait: Many Voices Inuit Prints from Cape Dorset in the art gallery of the Canadian embassy in Washington, D.C. In 2009–2010, she was part of the exhibition Uuturautiit: Cape Dorset Celebrates 50 Years of Printmaking at the National Gallery of Canada. She was included in the 1995 book, Inuit Women Artists: Voices from Cape Dorset. She lives and works near Cape Dorset, Nunavut.

== Life ==
Ashoona grew up traditionally on the land and was exposed to art from a young age. Her mother, Sheouak Parr, was a graphic artist and one of the first women to participate in the drawing projects of the 1950s. Her father was Agiak Petaulassie, an Anglican minister.

Ashoona first started carving and drawing in the 1970s while she was living at an outpost camp with her husband, and fellow artist Kaka Ashoona (1928–1996). The camp, on the southern coast of Baffin Island, required a certain level of self-sufficiency and Ashoona's carvings occupied her time and provided the family with income.

She moved back to Cape Dorest, Nunavut, after Kaka's death in 1996 where she continues to live and work.

== Artwork ==
Working primarily with prints, drawing, and carving, Ashoona's art is dynamic and has been internationally recognized. Her pieces often depict the natural world, from in number of styles, ranging from abstract to figural, and portray her unique Inuk perspective.

In 1986, her pieces were part of the exhibit "Northern Exposure: Inuit Images of Travel" by the Burnaby Art Gallery. She was also one of the nine featured artists at the exhibition "Isumavut: The Artistic Expression of Nine Cape Dorset Women" at the Canadian Museum of History in Hull, Quebec.

Her work is included in the collections of the National Gallery of Canada, and the Winnipeg Art Gallery.
