= David Ruben Piqtoukun =

Canadian artist (born 1950)

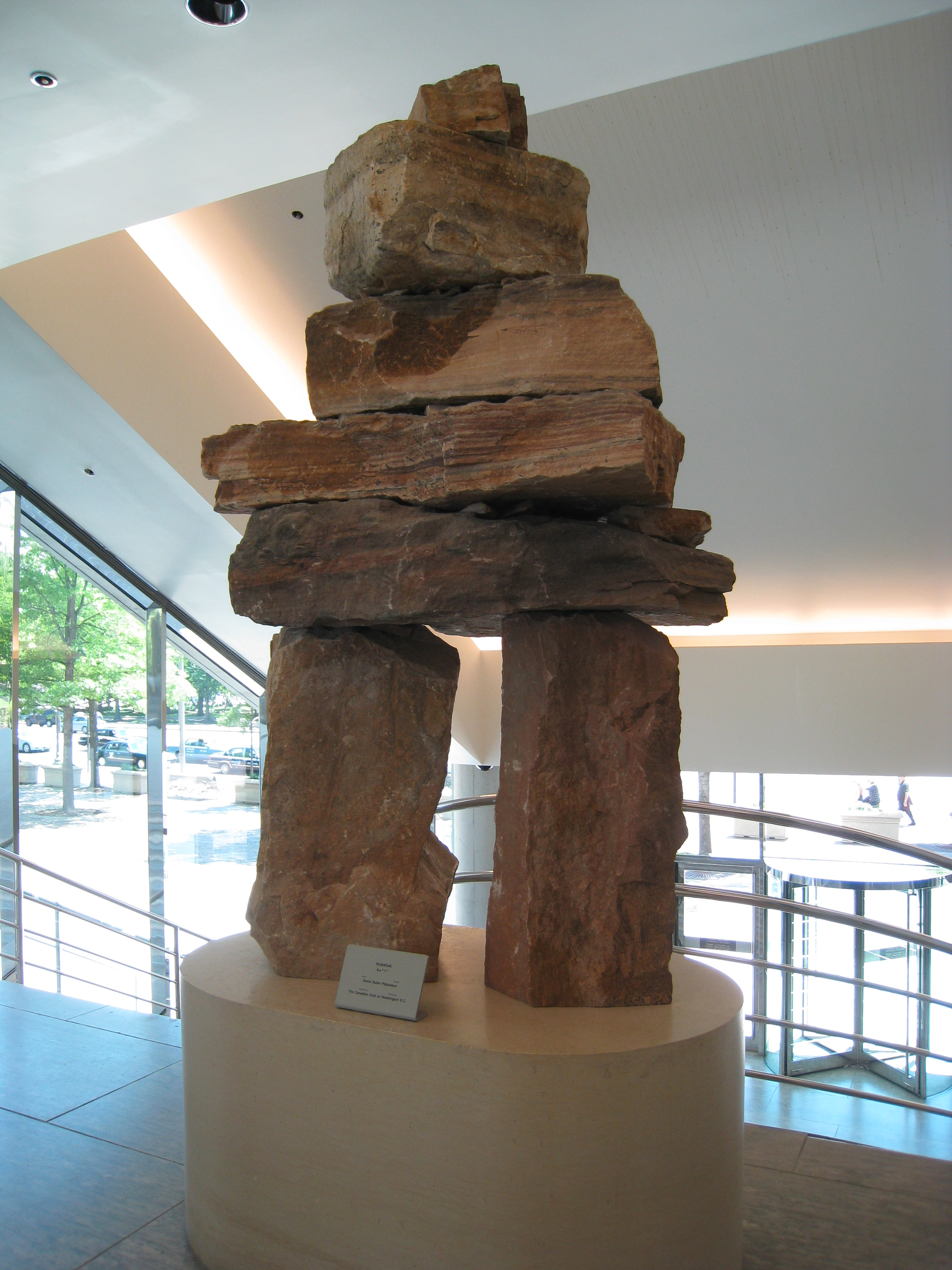
- Inuksuk built by David Ruben Piqtoukun in the lobby of the Embassy of Canada in Washington, D.C.
- Born: David Ruben; May 10, 1950 near Paulatuk, Northwest Territories
- Died: January 22, 2026 (aged 75); Belleville, Ontario, Canada
- Known for: sculptor

David Ruben Piqtoukun ᑎᕕᑎ ᐱᑐᑯ ᕈᐱᐃᓐ (also known as David Ruben) (May 10, 1950 – January 22, 2026) was an Inuvialuk (Inuk) artist from Paulatuk, Northwest Territories.

== Career ==
One of 15 children, Piqtoukun lived a traditional Inuit life until he was sent away to residential school at age five. In 1972, his brother Abraham Anghik Ruben introduced him to stone carving. He also studied books on art. He attributes the impetus behind making his work to art patron Dr. Allan Gonor from North Battleford, Saskatchewan in 1974. Gonor suggested he use stories Piqtoukun collected in his sculpture. Gonor told Piqtoukun:

"When you travel north, collect the stories — and from there, you introduce them into your carvings and then you start learning."

In 1975, he started compiling ancestral stories, creating an oral history for himself. It served as a source for his work and a way to re-establish his roots and identity. He died of cancer on January 22, 2026, at a hospice in Belleville, Ontario.

== Work ==
His output includes sculpture and prints; the sculptural work is innovative in its use of mixed media. His materials and imagery bring together modern and traditional Inuit stylistic elements in a personal vision. An example of this is his work The Passage of Time (1999), which portrays a angakkuq (shaman) in the form of a salmon moving through a hole in a hand. While shamanic imagery is common in much of Inuit art, the hand in this work is sheet metal, not a traditional material such as walrus ivory, the antler's of caribou or soapstone. Fellow Inuvialuk artist Floyd Kuptana learned sculpting techniques as an apprentice to David Ruben.

Piqtoukun mostly works in stone, but also casts in metal. Early in his career, he was interested in Rodin and his casting techniques and visited Paris to study the work of the French artist.

== Selected public exhibitions ==
In 1996, Piqtoukin re-examined his cultural dislocation caused by residential school in Between Two Worlds: Sculpture by David Ruben Piqtoukun , an exhibition at the Winnipeg Art Gallery (WAG) in Manitoba. The Winnipeg Art Gallery also organized Out of Tradition: Abraham Anghik / David Ruben Piqtoukun: a retrospective exhibition, curated by Darlene Wight. In 2023, Wanda Nanibush, Curator of Indigenous Art for the Art Gallery of Ontario celebrated his work with more than 60 of his sculptures which focused on his material inventiveness and narrative vision. The show was titled Radical Remembrance: the sculptures of David Ruben Piqtoukun. Piqtoukun's work also has been included in many group shows, in Canada and internationally.

== Selected public collections ==
His work is included in public collections such as the National Gallery of Canada, Ottawa; the Art Gallery of Ontario, Toronto; the McMichael Canadian Art Collection, Kleinburg; the Winnipeg Art Gallery; the Robert McLaughlin Gallery and the Staatliche Museum für Völkerkunde, Munich, Germany.

== Honours ==
- 1986: Carved an Inukshuk for the first Native Business Summit at the Toronto Convention Centre.
- 1989: Appointed to UNESCO's Canadian Committee for the World Decade of Cultural Development.
- 2000 - appointed to the Sculptors' Society of Canada, the first Inuk artist to be elected.
- 2022 - Governor General's Awards in Visual and Media Arts.

== Bibliography ==
- Ada, Michigan. MASTERS OF THE ARCTIC: An Exhibition of Contemporary Inuit Masterworks. Amway Corporation, 1989
