= Aiaktalik Island =

Island in Alaska, United States

Aiaktalik
- Location within Alaska

Geography
- Location: Pacific Ocean
- Coordinates: 56°42′14″N 154°3′19″W
- Archipelago: Kodiak Archipelago
- Area: 20 km^{2} (7.7 sq mi)
- Highest elevation: 38 m (125 ft)

Administration
- United States
- State: Alaska
- Borough: Kodiak Island

Aiaktalik Island is an island located in the Gulf of Alaska approximately 1.2 miles (1.9 km) south of Kodiak Island. In the immediate vicinity are the Trinity Islands, which are about 5 miles (8.0 km) south of Aiaktalik Island. The island is 20 km^{2} and uninhabited.
