= Karoo Ashevak =

Native American carver and sculptor (1940–1974)

- Born: 1940; Kitikmeot Region
- Died: October 19, 1974 (aged 33–34)

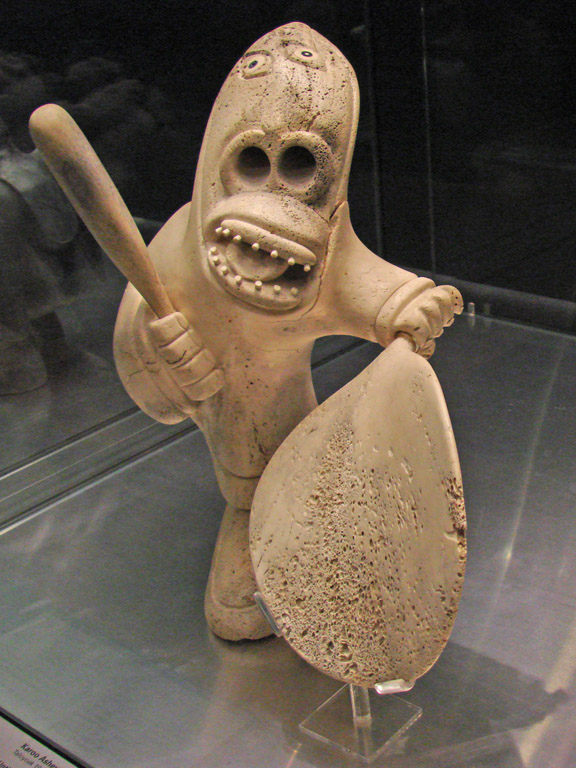
Drummer by Karoo Ashevak

Karoo Ashevak (Inuktitut: ᑲᕈ ᐊᓴᕙ) (1940 – October 19, 1974) was an Inuk sculptor who lived a nomadic hunting life in the Kitikmeot Region of the central Arctic before moving into Spence Bay, Northwest Territories (now Taloyoak, Nunavut) in 1960. His career as an artist started in 1968 by participating in a government-funded carving program. Working with the primary medium of fossilized whale bone, Ashevak created approximately 250 sculptures in his lifetime, and explored themes of shamanism and Inuit spirituality through playful depictions of human figures, angakuit (shamans), spirits, and Arctic wildlife.

In 1970, the Canadian Eskimo Art Council held the Centennial competition in Yellowknife. Ashevak's sculptures won third prize in that competition, and he became a recognizable artist after his solo exhibition at the American Indian Art Centre in New York in 1973. Unlike other Inuit primitivist carvings, Ashevak's work abandoned cultural references and adopted a modern expressionistic style, which visually appealed to a broader audience than collectors of Inuit art.

An extensive collection of Ashevak's sculptures went on solo or group exhibitions at commercial galleries around the world, including Franz Bader Gallery at Washington, D.C., Lippel Gallery in Montreal, the Upstairs Gallery in Winnipeg and the Inuit Gallery in Toronto. Ashevak's works were also widely traded on the auction market. Despite his early death — he died in October 1974 from a house fire, Ashevak was crucial to the development of Inuit sculpture by visualizing an imaginative world with supernatural beings and shamanistic practices.

== Early life ==
Ashevak was born in 1940 in the Kitikmeot Region, of the central Arctic of Nunavut. Like many Netsilik youths, he lived a traditional Inuit life by acquiring hunting skills that were necessary to support himself in later life. However, Ashevak grew up at a time when the establishment of wage-earning settlements rapidly replaced the Eskimo lifestyle and economy. In the past, Netsilik people lived in small communities and worked as nomadic hunters. Since they moved off the land to Spence Bay (Taloyoak), they were forced to adopt a southern-style economy such as living in a house and having a stable job. Ashevak and his wife Doris moved into the settlement in 1968. During that time, Abjon Bromfield, the Arts and Crafts officer at Fort Smith, Northwest Territories received a shipment of two carvings from Spence Bay. These Inuit carvings were highly appreciated in Ottawa and inspired people's interest in purchasing more sculptures from the region. Therefore, a carving program was funded by the government in Spence Bay, and sculptor Algie Malauskas was hired to teach Inuit some fundamental sculpture techniques. Ashevak soon joined the program because he could no longer support his family by hunting, and carving was one of the well-paid alternatives to earn a livelihood. Ashevak's official entrance into the art world was in 1970, where he participated in the Centennial competition in Yellowknife, held by the Canadian Eskimo Art Council. Ashevak's sculptures, Bird and Drum Dancer won third prize and an honourable mention respectively. In 1972, Avrom Isaacs collected Ashevak's works to organize a solo exhibition at the Inuit Gallery in Toronto. The show was financially successful in which about 30 pieces of Ashevak's sculptures became trendy among the public and sold well. However, this exhibition did not make Ashevak famous. His reputation was firmly established after the exhibition at the American Indian Art Centre in New York in 1973.

== Career ==
In 1968, Karoo Ashevak settled in Taloyoak where his career began through an arts and crafts program sponsored by the government. His style evolved into the well-known "expressionistic style" in the Kitikmeot area in the early 1970s. His works are inspired by stories told to him in his childhood by his father. Many of his sculptures have wide noses, gaping mouths, and uneven eyes. His art is admired for this originality and abnormal appearance. While some people praised his work, others considered it too grotesque. The majority of his artistic production occurred from 1971 to 1974. During this time, he was unknown in the art market, nonetheless, he held several exhibitions where his work appealed to the majority and sold in mass amounts. He was first noticed in Yellowknife when he entered the Centennial competition in 1970 organized by the Canadian Eskimo Art Council. It was not until his late artistic career that he gained recognition. He is now acknowledged as an important artist in Canadian Inuit art. He was not exclusively recognized until spring of 1972 when Avrom Isaacs used Karoo's sculptures in a one-man exhibition at the Inuit Gallery in Toronto. Despite its success, it did not make him famous he was mainly known to those associated with Eskimo art. Finally, in January 1973, his exhibition at the American Indian Art Centre in New York established his local fame and overall reputation in the eastern U.S. and Canada. This marked the height of his career, just a year prior to his death.

== Media ==
In the 1970s, Ashevak favoured and used predominantly aged whale bones as his medium. During his artistic years, whale bones would be imported to the community through charter planes from Somerset Island because this material was sparse while demands were higher than the inventory. They were not readily available in Spence Bay and many other carvers were seeking it for their artistic production. Historically, bones were used in Taloyoak to make tools and weapons. It was not until the settlement began its carving production that bone was used as the main medium, with whale bone being the material used for the first carving produced.

Both the prehistoric Thule people and the later colonialist European whalers left mass amounts of whale bone. These aged bones experienced inconsistent and prolonged exposure from Arctic conditions. This altered their qualities and features, such as their density and colour. Whale bones needed to be aged for approximately 50 to 100 years before it is qualified for carving. If the material is partially aged or dried, it may smell or shrink while working with the material.

Whale bone is a diverse and varied medium that can be found in colors from white to cream, to brown, to nearly black. Additionally, bone ranges from very dense to extremely fragile. The material may also transform from one density to another, requiring great skill and adaptability from the artist. For example, sometimes bone can become extremely hard to the point that it is nearly impossible to carve. Whale bone may also crack or split before, during, and after carving. Cracks that occur during the production process can be integrated into the final piece; however, splits that appear after carving often destroy the piece.

Ashevak's choice of medium could have been a result of limited materials for sculpting in his community or a preference for light materials, rather than heavy mediums such as stone or ivory. Despite working primarily with fossilized whale bone, Ashevak often incorporated other local materials, such as stone, caribou antler, baleen, and walrus ivory, as additional supplements.

Ashevak would first come up with an idea for a sculpture before selecting the medium to use. He took advantage of the preexisting shapes of the bone and manipulated the material in order to fit his ideas and the work's theme. He also tended to rearrange and reform bone from different parts of the whale, choosing to prioritize design concept, rather than staying within the bounds of a certain piece of bone. For example, Ashevak is known to have incorporated whale baleen in forming the eyes and mouths of his sculptures.

== Ashevak and the art market ==
According to Leon Lippel, Ashevak's sculptures evoked an overwhelmingly affirmative response at his own time. Between 1972 and 1974, the artist had several successful exhibitions, and his works sold very well on the art market. Ashevak's sculptures were universal in message and appeal, which was strikingly different from most Inuit art. Max Wheitzenhoffer from the Gimpel-Wheitzenhoffer gallery stated that he "never looked at Ashevak’s pieces as Eskimo art."

Inuit sculptures followed a narrative tradition by depicting legends, events or social activities that were well known among Inuit communities. In contrast, Ashevak's sculptures abandoned this illustrative tradition. Each of his pieces portrays an individual being with no cultural references to particular myths, stories or events. Therefore, Ashevak's work could speak to the audience who did not have any knowledge of the Inuit culture and attract the audience based on its purely aesthetic values. There were two distinctive characteristics of Ashevak's early exhibitions. First, his sculptures were strongly appealing to non-Inuit art collectors, including those who did not regularly collect. Second, people were astonished by Ashevak's work and reacted immediately with tremendous enthusiasm. Ashevak became a recognizable figure in Canada and the United States shortly after his exhibitions at the Inuit Gallery of Toronto (1972) and the American Indian Arts Centre in New York (1973). It normally took a while for the audience to embrace a new artistic style, but they fell in love with Ashevak's work at once.

== Works and shamanism ==
Ashevak's sculptures present a fantasy of spirits and supernatural beings bursting with powerful emotions. His figures embody wide eyes, gaping mouths, distorted body features and incised lines, which are directly related to Inuit religion (shamanism). Angakuit (shamans) are people with special powers that enable them to act as a mediator between the temporal world and the spiritual world. Shamanism is based on the animistic belief that a spirit could exist in every being and take different forms. Some spirits are friendly to human beings, and they function as helping spirits to assist angakuit performing supernatural tasks. In contrast to the helping spirits, evil spirits attack or eat humans, and they would bring misfortune and disasters to the community. Angakuit could protect people from evil spirits by acquiring helping spirits that are frequently seen in polar bears, birds and walrus. Ashevak portrayed various helping spirits in animal forms such as Bear (1973), Flying Walrus (1972), and a mystical four-legged creature with wings.

Another favourite subject of Ashevak's sculptures are birds. Some of them have prey in their mouths, while others embody unusual features such as human arms (1972), or experience a human-bird transformation. Birds are associated with the angakkuq's magical flights. In the Netsilik tradition, angakuit could be transformed into birds, and travel to all regions in the cosmos. During their magical journeys, angakuit fly into the sky, the land of the dead, and even to the homes of ancient Inuit deities. Ashevak depicted these shamanistic flights through his sculptures of Flying Figure (1971) and Shaman (1973), where the angakuits’ bodies are represented in a flying position.

Ashevak untitled most of his works, but one of the very few sculptures which had a title was directly related to shamanism. In the Inuit culture, one needs to take an apprenticeship to become a angakkuq. The angakkuq candidate needs to receive formal training from an elder, which helps him gain skills and powers that are necessary to fulfil his future position. By the end of the practice, an elder angakkuq would transmit his power to the young angakkuq by placing his hands on the young shaman's head. Ashevak's work, Coming and Going of the Shaman (1973) represents the transformation of powers between two angakuit. This sculpture has two heads of different sizes that share one body. The angakkuq with the larger head is disappearing as he passes his powers to the angakkuq with the smaller head.

Ashevak's choices of subjects also came from dreams, childhood stories and hunting scenes. Dream was a crucial element of Inuit culture, especially in the Netsilik community. Ashevak's sculpture, Drum Dancer was inspired by his dream of a man with three arms. Other visual elements in Ashevak's creations included varying sizes and shapes of eyes. According to the shamanistic belief, certain spirits acted as the angakkuq's eyes, and they could fly over long distance and report to the angakkuq what they had seen. Moreover, Ashevak's use of incised lines was related to the Thule culture. In his sculptures, Bird of 1970 and 1971, incised lines are used to depict the skeleton of the birds, which is a typical characteristic of shamanism.

== Personal life ==
Ashevak was known for having a distinctive personality among the Inuit artists by being openly expressive about his emotions. It was uncommon for Inuit adults to display their feelings because they highly valued the idea of Ihuma, which was the ability of emotional restraint. Ihuma was a significant indigenous personality, and the grown-ups exercised Ihuma by hiding their joy or anger in front of the public. However, Ashevak freely vented his emotions, and sometimes he even displayed aggressive and antagonistic behaviours.

Ashevak enjoyed the creative process of carvings, and he took enormous pride in his work. Although the artist was aware of the market value of his sculptures, he priced them accurately by himself. Carving was the primary resource of Ashevak's income, but money was not the only factor to inspire his continuous creations. Ashevak's favourite part of sculpture was to apply finishing touches, which gave the final piece distinctive details. Ashevak respected the originality of carvings, and he became irritated when other sculptors copied his works since he did not know how to deal with the imitators.

In August 1974, Ashevak's life started to come to a tragic end. His adopted son, Lary, was killed by dogs. On October 19 of the same year, Ashevak and his wife Doris both died in a fire that destroyed their house.

== Achievements ==
Ashevak established a well-known reputation in his community and the nearby area of Uqsuqtuc, otherwise recognized as Gjoa Haven, during his artistic career. His work inspired a whole generation of Kitikmeot carvers. Although he only created about 250 sculptures during his short artistic career, his works have been included in multiple exhibitions and continue to be widely collected as well as traded on the art market and during auctions. They are also included in many corporate and museum collections. He executed solo exhibitions in Toronto, Montreal, and New York. When he was first officially noticed in 1970 during the Centennial competition in Yellowknife, he won third prize and honourable mention for his entries of Bird and Drum Dancer, respectively. This was the beginning of his successful career. Ashevak's early exhibitions between 1972 and 1974 had very successful outcomes as many works were sought after and sold even though he was not well-known yet. Two features that make these exhibitions stand out is the type of purchaser and the audience reaction. The sculptures were popular amongst Eskimo and non-Eskimo art collectors as well as people who normally do not collect Eskimo art. The audience were also immediately captivated by his work, especially in exhibitions at the Inuit Gallery in Toronto and the American Indian Arts Centre in New York.

Theatrical producer, Max Weitzenhoffer, ranked Ashevak as one of the top contemporary Canadian sculptors because he viewed Askevak's work apart and unique from the other Inuit artists’ production. He believes that they are universally accepted and appeal to a mass majority. Scholar, George Swinton, compared him to Henry Moore who is a well-known English artist famous for his sculptures.

== Exhibitions ==
- 1972: "Eskimo Fantastic Art", University of Manitoba, Winnipeg
- 1973: "Cultures of the Sun and the Snow: Indian and Eskimo Art of the Americas", Montreal Museum of Fine Arts, Quebec
- 1973: "Karoo Ashevak: Spirits", at the American Indian Arts Centre, New York City
- 1973: "Karoo Ashevak Whalebone Sculpture", Lippel Gallery, Montreal
- 1973: "Spirits", Franz Bader Gallery, Washington, D.C.
- 1977: "Karoo Ashevak", Winnipeg Art Gallery, Manitoba
- 1977: "White Sculpture of the Inuit", Simon Fraser University Art Gallery, Burnaby, B.C.
- 1977: "Karoo Ashevak (1940-1974): Sculpture", Upstairs Gallery, Winnipeg
- 1978: "The Coming and Going of the Shaman: Eskimo Shamanism and Art", Winnipeg Art Gallery, Manitoba
- 1980: "Whalebone Carvings and Inuit Prints", Memorial University of Newfoundland Art Gallery, St. John's
- 1983: "Inuit Masterworks: Selections from the Collection of Indian and Northern Affairs Canada", McMichael Canadian Art Collection, Kleinberg, Ontario
- 1985: "Uumajut: Animal Imagery in Inuit Art", Winnipeg Art Gallery, Manitoba
- 1986: "Contemporary Inuit Art", National Gallery of Canada, Ottawa
- 1988: "Building on Strengths: New Inuit Art from the Collection", Winnipeg Art Gallery, Manitoba
- 1988: "In the Shadow of the Sun: Contemporary Indian and Inuit Art in Canada", Canadian Museum of Civilization, Gatineau, Quebec
- 1990: "Arctic Mirror", Canadian Museum of Civilization, Gatineau, Quebec
- 1990: "Inuit Art From the Glenbow Collection", Glenbow Museum, Calgary
- 1994: "Transcending the Specifics of Inuit Heritage: Karoo in Ottawa", at the National Gallery of Canada
- 1999 – 2000: "Carving and Identity: Inuit Sculpture from the Permanent Collection", National Gallery of Canada, Ottawa
- 1999: "Iqqaipaa: Celebrating Inuit Art, 1948 - 1970", Canadian Museum of Civilization, Gatineau, Quebec

== Collections ==
Museum and gallery collections that permanently houses his works:

- Art Gallery of Ontario (Toronto)
- Canadian Museum of Civilization (Gatineau, Quebec)
- Glenbow Museum (Calgary, Alberta)
- Heard Museum (Phoenix, Arizona)
- McMichael Canadian Art Collection (Kleinburg, Ontario)
- Montreal Museum of Fine Arts (Quebec), Museum of Anthropology (University of British Columbia, Vancouver)
- Museum of Inuit Art (Toronto, Ontario)
- Prince of Wales Northern Heritage Centre (Yellowknife, Northwest Territories)
- Quebec Museum of Fine Arts (Quebec City)
- Smithsonian Institution National Museum of the American Indian (Washington, D.C.)
- University of Alberta (Edmonton, Alberta)
- Winnipeg Art Gallery (Manitoba)
- National Gallery of Canada (Ottawa)
- Lorne Balshine Inuit Art Collection at the Vancouver International Airport (Vancouver, B.C.)
- TD Gallery of Inuit Art at the Toronto-Dominion Centre (Toronto, Ontario)
