= John Pangnark =

Canadian Inuk sculptor (1920-1980)

John Pangnark (1920 in Windy Lake, Nunavut – 1980) was an Inuk sculptor, and native of Arviat, Northwest Territories (now Nunavut, Canada). His work is notable for its frequent use of geometric abstraction and its nearly exclusive focus on the human figure in carved stone.

His work is in the collections of the Dennos Museum Center in Traverse City, Michigan, and the National Gallery of Canada in Ottawa.
