= Kitikmeot, Unorganized =

Unorganized area of Nunavut, Canada

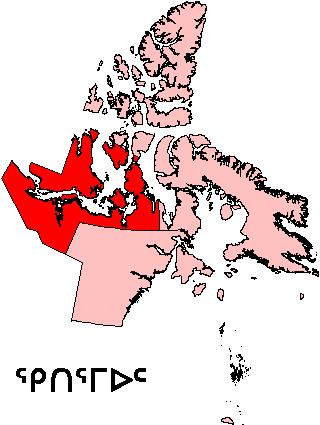
Map of Nunavut highlighting Kitikmeot

Kitikmeot, Unorganized is part of the Kitikmeot census division in Nunavut, Canada that covers the entire Kitikmeot Region outside the communities. There are no communities included in this area; it covers traditional and outpost camps.

== Demographics ==
In the 2021 Canadian census conducted by Statistics Canada, Unorganized Kitikmeot had a population of 0, no change from its 2016 population. The census subdivision has a land area of 431,190.46 km^{2} (166,483.57 sq mi).

== Named places ==
Named places listed in 2021 by Statistics Canada are:

- Bathurst Inlet
- Fort Ross
- Kitikmeot
- Kitikmeot, Unorganized
- Lupin
- Perry Island
- Read Island
- Thom Bay
