= Pauta Saila =

Canadian Inuk artist (1916 or 1917-2009)

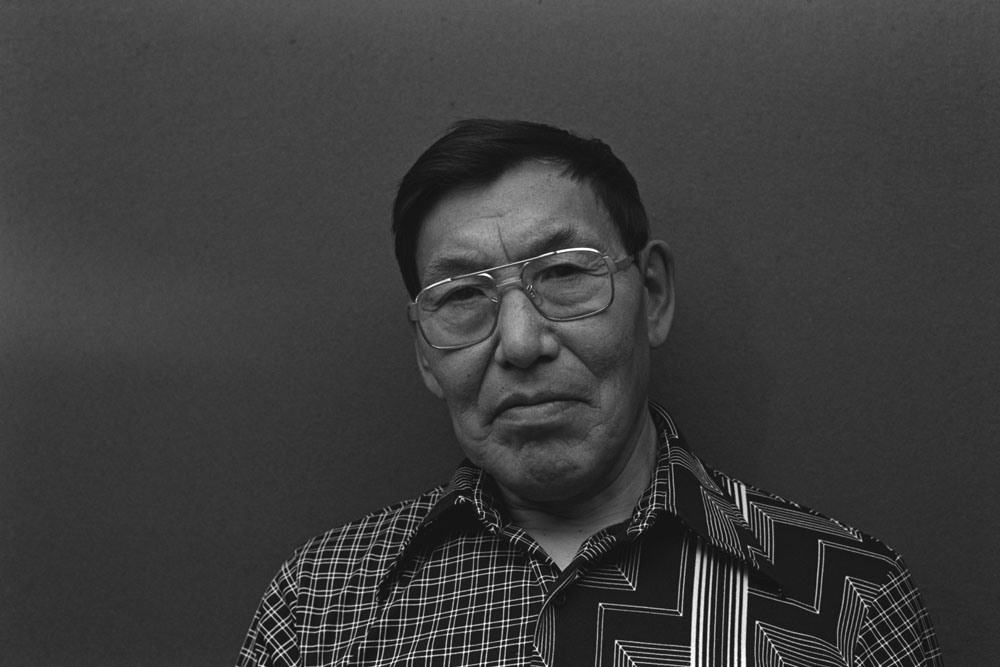
- Pauta Saila in 1980
- Born: 1916 or 1917; Kilaparutua, Baffin Island, Canada
- Died: June 9, 2009 (aged 92–93); Cape Dorset, Nunavut
- Known for: Inuk sculptor
- Spouse(s): Mukshowya (m. 1937, died) Pitaloosie Saila (m. 1960)

Pauta Saila RCA (1916 or 1917–2009) was an Inuk artist from Kilaparutua, Baffin Island, Canada who resided in Cape Dorset, Nunavut. His sister was artist Sharni Pootoogook.

His works are massive, simplified sculptures of Arctic wildlife, usually in soapstone; best known are his dancing bears.

Pauta's second wife was the Inuk artist Pitaloosie Saila.

He was elected to the Royal Canadian Academy of Arts in 2003.

== Works ==
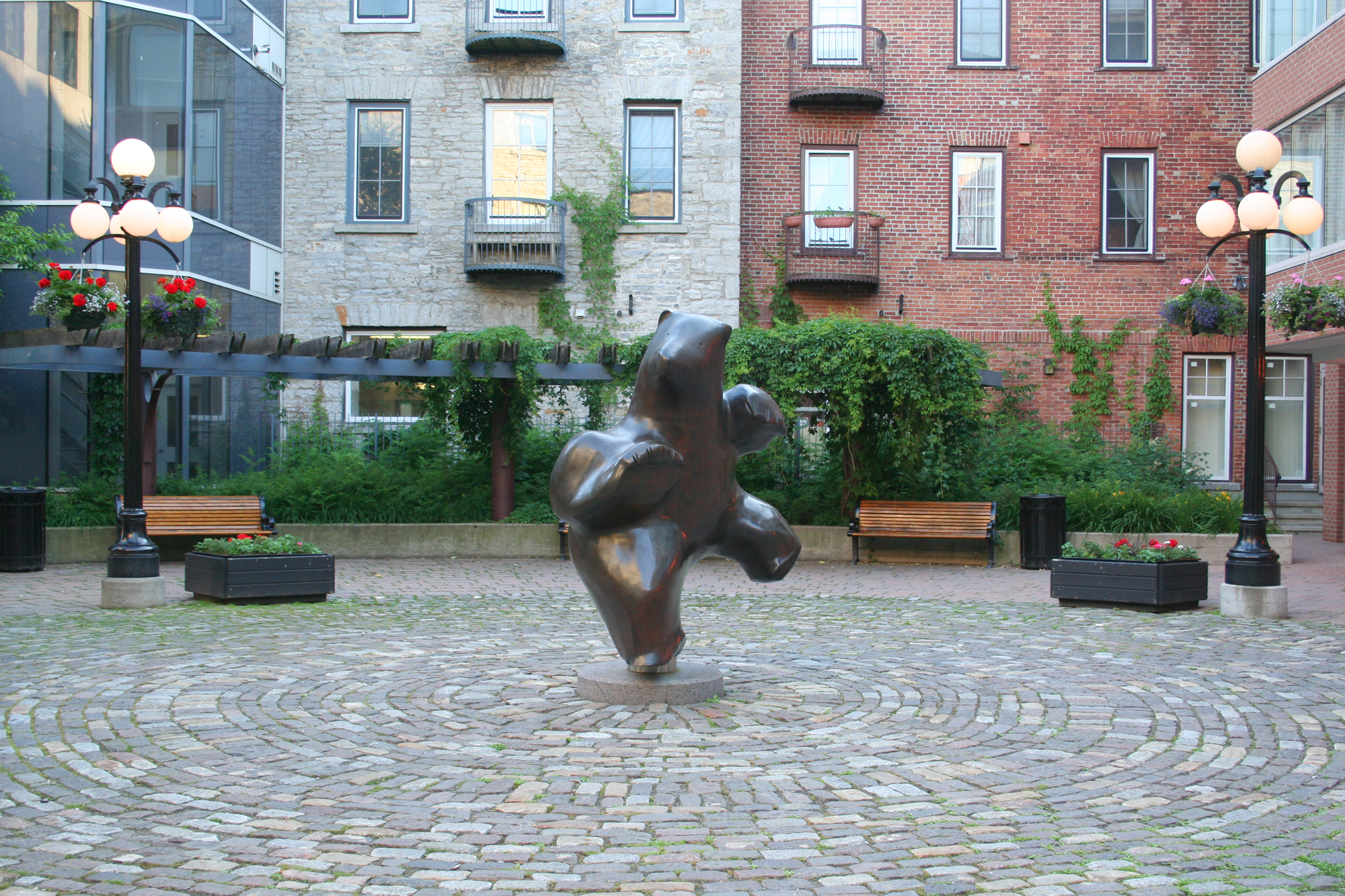
Dancing bear sculpture by Saila in Ottawa's Byward Market

- Bear, at the McMichael Canadian Art Collection.
