= Evans Strait =

Natural waterway through the central Canadian Arctic Archipelago

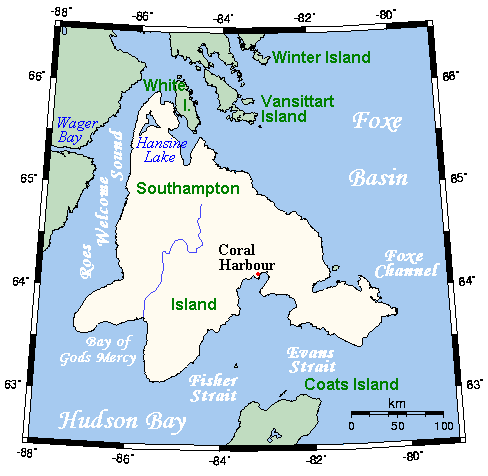
A closeup map of Southampton Island, Hudson Bay, Canada

Evans Strait (63°15′N 082°15′W) is a natural waterway through the central Canadian Arctic Archipelago in the territory of Nunavut. It separates Southampton Island's Bell Peninsula (to the north) from Coats Island (to the south). Appatuuraarjuk (Walrus Island) lies to the east of the strait.

It is part of the Hudson Strait–Evans Strait–Foxe Channel (HEF) which used to be under the Laurentide ice sheet. The strait connects Hudson Bay to the Labrador Sea. Its maximum depth is approximately 900 metres.

The area has been recognised as an signifiicant migration route for endangered marine mammals such as the Western Hudson Bay beluga whale (Delphinapterus leucas) and the Central-Low Arctic walrus (Odobenus rosmarus). In addition, Evans Strait and Coats Island are subsistance harvesting grounds for local communities. Due to industrialisation in the region, the strait has had less ice and been ice-free for longer periods, and the number of boats passing through has increased, likely affecting people and wildlife in the region.
