= Minto =

Minto may refer to:

== Places ==
=== Australia ===
- Minto, New South Wales, a suburb of Sydney
  - Minto railway station
- Minto County, Western Australia
- Parish of Minto, New South Wales

=== Canada ===
- Minto City, British Columbia
- Minto, Manitoba
- Minto (electoral district), in the City of Winnipeg
- Rural Municipality of Minto, Manitoba
  - Rural Municipality of Minto-Odanah, Manitoba
- Minto, New Brunswick
- Minto, Ontario, a town
- Minto, Yukon
  - Minto Aerodrome, in Yukon
- Minto (lava flow), Yukon
- Minto Bridges, a series of truss bridges in Ottawa
- Minto Inlet, Northwest Territories
- Minto Islands, Nunavut
- Minto Park, in downtown Ottawa
- Lake Minto, Nunavik, Quebec
- Mount Minto, British Columbia
- Mount Minto (Nunavut)

=== India ===
- Minto Bridge, a railway bridge in New Delhi
- Minto Eye Hospital, in Bangalore
- Minto Park, Allahabad, later renamed Madan Mohan Malaviya Park after independence of India

=== United States ===
- Minto, Alaska
- Minto, North Dakota, a city
  - Minto School

=== Elsewhere ===
- Minto, Scottish Borders, Scotland, UK
- Minto Park, Lahore, later renamed Greater Iqbal Park after the creation of Pakistan
- Mount Minto (Antarctica)

== People ==
- Minto (surname)
- Barbara Minto, American author and consultant
- Earl of Minto, a title in the peerage of the UK

== Vessels ==
- CGS Minto, a Canadian icebreaker
- Minto (sternwheeler), a lake steamer in British Columbia, Canada
- Minto Sailing Dinghy, a nine-foot sailing dinghy

== Other uses ==
- MINTO (Mixed Integer Optimizer), an integer programming solver
- Minto Group, a Canadian real estate company

== See also ==
- Mentos, mint flavored candies
- Prince Albert Mintos, a Canadian ice hockey team
- Dickson Minto, a Scottish law firm
- Mount Minto (disambiguation)
