= Qaqsauqtuuq Migratory Bird Sanctuary =

- East Bay Migratory Bird Sanctuary
- IUCN category Ib (wilderness area)
- Location within Nunavut Location within Canada
- Location: Southampton Island, Kivalliq, Nunavut, Canada
- Nearest town: Coral Harbour
- Coordinates: 64°N 82°W
- Area: 112,811 ha (1,128.11 km^{2}; 435.57 mi^{2})
- Established: 1959

The Qaqsauqtuuq Migratory Bird Sanctuary formerly the East Bay Migratory Bird Sanctuary, or Refuge d'oiseaux de la baie Est is a migratory bird sanctuary in the Kivalliq Region, Nunavut, Canada. It is located in East Bay, an arm of Hudson Bay, in southeast Southampton Island. The nearest community is Coral Harbour, 35 km (22 mi) to the west.

It is one of two bird sanctuaries on the island, the other being the Ikkattuaq Migratory Bird Sanctuary, situated 193 km (120 mi) to the southwest.

Established 1 January 1959, and consisting of 112,811 ha (1,128.11 km^{2}; 435.57 mi^{2}) it is rated Category IV by the International Union for Conservation of Nature. Of its 1,124 km^{2} (434 sq mi) in overall size, 286 km^{2} (110 sq mi) is a marine area with marine, intertidal, and subtidal components.

== Climate ==
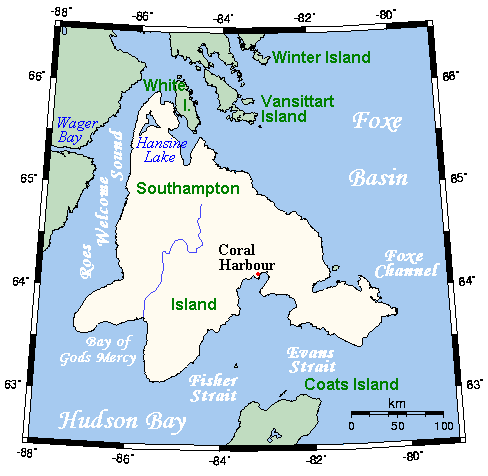
Closeup of Southampton Island

Southampton Island has a severe subarctic climate (Köppen Dfc) which transitions into a tundra climate (ET). Like almost all of Nunavut, Southampton Island is entirely above the tree line. Coral Harbour has never gone above freezing in January, February and March (although the latter has recorded 0.0 °C (32.0 °F). Due to the frozen nature of Hudson Bay, there is a severe seasonal lag until June, especially compared to more continental areas such as Fairbanks despite much sunshine and perpetual twilight at night. Due to the drop of solar strength and the absence of warm water even in summer, temperatures still drop off very fast as September approaches. Cold extremes are severe, but in line with many areas even farther south in Canada's interior.

Climate data for Coral Harbour (Coral Harbour Airport) WMO ID: 71915; coordinates 64°11′36″N 83°21′34″W; elevation: 62.2 m (204 ft); 1991–2020 normals, extremes 1933−present
Month	Jan	Feb	Mar	Apr	May	Jun	Jul	Aug	Sep	Oct	Nov	Dec	Year
Record high humidex	0.2	−1.9	−0.5	4.4	8.9	23.1	32.8	30.1	19.9	7.6	3.7	3.2	32.8
Record high °C (°F)	0.6 (33.1)	−1.1 (30.0)	0.0 (32.0)	5.0 (41.0)	9.4 (48.9)	23.5 (74.3)	28.0 (82.4)	26.1 (79.0)	18.5 (65.3)	7.6 (45.7)	4.0 (39.2)	3.4 (38.1)	28.0 (82.4)
Mean daily maximum °C (°F)	−24.9 (−12.8)	−25.6 (−14.1)	−20.2 (−4.4)	−11.0 (12.2)	−2.5 (27.5)	6.9 (44.4)	14.8 (58.6)	12.1 (53.8)	4.8 (40.6)	−2.5 (27.5)	−11.2 (11.8)	−19.2 (−2.6)	−6.5 (20.3)
Daily mean °C (°F)	−29.0 (−20.2)	−29.7 (−21.5)	−24.9 (−12.8)	−16.1 (3.0)	−6.0 (21.2)	3.5 (38.3)	10.2 (50.4)	8.2 (46.8)	2.0 (35.6)	−5.5 (22.1)	−15.5 (4.1)	−23.4 (−10.1)	−10.5 (13.1)
Mean daily minimum °C (°F)	−33.2 (−27.8)	−33.7 (−28.7)	−29.7 (−21.5)	−21.1 (−6.0)	−9.6 (14.7)	0.1 (32.2)	5.6 (42.1)	4.2 (39.6)	−0.8 (30.6)	−8.6 (16.5)	−19.8 (−3.6)	−27.6 (−17.7)	−14.5 (5.9)
Record low °C (°F)	−52.8 (−63.0)	−51.4 (−60.5)	−49.4 (−56.9)	−39.4 (−38.9)	−31.1 (−24.0)	−15.6 (3.9)	−1.1 (30.0)	−3.3 (26.1)	−17.2 (1.0)	−34.4 (−29.9)	−40.6 (−41.1)	−48.9 (−56.0)	−52.8 (−63.0)
Record low wind chill	−69.5	−69.3	−64.3	−55.1	−39.7	−23.2	−8.2	−11.8	−23.7	−43.7	−54.8	−64.2	−69.5
Average precipitation mm (inches)	10.9 (0.43)	—	9.6 (0.38)	18.2 (0.72)	19.9 (0.78)	28.0 (1.10)	34.8 (1.37)	61.7 (2.43)	44.9 (1.77)	36.6 (1.44)	23.3 (0.92)	—	—
Average rainfall mm (inches)	0.0 (0.0)	—	0.0 (0.0)	0.5 (0.02)	5.4 (0.21)	22.6 (0.89)	34.8 (1.37)	61.4 (2.42)	35.6 (1.40)	8.4 (0.33)	0.3 (0.01)	—	—
Average snowfall cm (inches)	—	11.2 (4.4)	—	9.6 (3.8)	18.1 (7.1)	14.8 (5.8)	5.4 (2.1)	0.0 (0.0)	0.0 (0.0)	7.8 (3.1)	28.1 (11.1)	22.9 (9.0)	—
Average precipitation days (≥ 0.2 mm)	9.4	—	8.7	9.7	10.6	10.2	9.8	13.0	12.0	15.4	14.0	—	—
Average rainy days (≥ 0.2 mm)	0.0	—	0.06	0.13	2.2	7.9	9.8	13.0	8.6	4.0	0.55	—	—
Average snowy days (≥ 0.2 cm)	9.2	—	8.7	9.7	9.4	3.4	0.0	0.0	4.1	14.0	13.4	—	—
Average relative humidity (%) (at 1500 LST)	67.4	66.4	69.2	74.5	80.3	73.1	62.8	69.1	75.8	85.5	79.7	72.0	73.0
Mean monthly sunshine hours	37.9	112.1	187.4	240.2	239.9	262.2	312.3	220.4	109.8	70.8	47.9	18.8	1,859.7
Percentage possible sunshine	22.4	47.0	51.6	53.2	42.0	41.9	51.2	43.3	27.9	23.3	24.3	13.9	36.8
Source: Environment and Climate Change Canada (sun 1981–2010)

== Flora ==
The sanctuary's habitat consists of three main types, water, unvegetated land, and moist or wet vegetated tundra. This can be further broken down as dry heath, gravel ridge, intertidal zone, moss carpet, scrub willow, and sedge meadow.

A 1986 list of plants in the sanctuary found over 100 species of algae, fungi, lichens, bryophytes, and vascular plants.

Plants found in the sanctuary include:

- Arctic willow (Salix arcticus)
- Bigelow's sedge (Carex bigelowii)
- Creeping goose grass (Puccinellia phryganodes)
- Dark brown sedge (]Carex atrofusca)
- Hoppner's sedge (Carex subspathacea)
- Mountain avens (Dryas integrifolia)
- Prickly saxifrage (Saxifraga tricuspidata])
- Short-leaved sedge (Carex misandra)
- Snow willow (Salix reticulata])
- Wideleaf polargrass (Arctagrostis latifolia)

== Fauna ==
=== Bird species ===
Birds listed by the Committee on the Status of Endangered Wildlife in Canada (COSEWIC) or the Species at Risk Act (SARA) are noted as to their status. Bird species include:

- American golden plover (Pluvialis dominica)
- Arctic tern (Sterna paradisaea)
- Atlantic brant (Branta bernicla)
- Baird's sandpiper (Calidris bairdii)
- Bank swallow (Riparia riparia^{Th})
- Barn swallow (Hirundo rustica^{Th})
- Black guillemot (Cepphus grylle)
- Black-bellied plover (Pluvialis squatarola)
- Cackling goose (Branta hutchinsii)
- Canada goose (Branta canadensis)
- Common eider (Somateria mollissima)
- Dunlin (Calidris alpina)
- European herring gull (Larus argentatus)
- Harris's sparrow (Zonotrichia querula^{Scb})
- Ivory gull (Pagophila eburnea^{En})
- King eider (Somateria spectabilis)
- Lesser snow goose (Anser caerulescens caerulescens)
- Long-tailed duck (Clangula hyemalis)
- Long-tailed jaeger (Stercorarius longicaudus)
- Northern pintail (Anas acuta)
- Pacific loon (Gavia pacifica)
- Parasitic jaeger (Stercorarius parasiticus)
- Peregrine falcon (Falco peregrinus)
- Purple sandpiper (Calidris maritima)
- Red knot (Rufa red knot, Calidris canutus rufa^{En})
- Red phalarope (Phalaropus fulicarius)
- Red-necked phalarope (Phalaropus lobatus^{Sc})
- Red-throated loon (Gavia stellata)
- Ross's goose (Anser rossii)
- Ross's gull (Rhodostethia rosea^{Th})
- Ruddy turnstone (Arenaria interpres)
- Sabine's gull (Xema sabini)
- Semipalmated plover (Charadrius semipalmatus)
- Short-eared owl (Asio flammeus^{Sc})
- Tundra swan (Cygnus columbianus)
- Whimbrel (Numenius phaeopus)
- White-rumped sandpiper (Calidris fuscicollis)

=== Mammals ===
Mammals in the area are mainly Arctic fox (Alopex lagopus), Arctic hare (Lepus arcticus), brown (Lemmus sibiricus), and collared lemmings (Dicrostonyx groenlandicus). Barren-ground caribou (Rangifer tarandus) were reintroduced from Coats Island in 1967.^{Scb} Wolves (Canis lupus), red foxes (Vulpes vulpes), and wolverines (Gulo gulo^{Sc}) are occasionally sighted.

Marine mammals include Atlantic walrus (Odobenus rosmarus rosmarus^{Scb}), bearded seal (Erignathus barbatus), beluga whale (Delphinapterus leucas^{Scb}), bowhead whale (Balaena mysticetus^{Scb}), harbor seal (Phoca vitulina), harp seal (Pagophilus groenlandicus), narwhal (Monodon monoceros^{Scb}), polar bear (Ursus maritimus), ringed seal (Pusa hispida^{Scb}), walrus (Odobenus rosmarus).

- ^ThListed as threatened by COSEWIC and by SARA
- ^EnListed as endangered by COSEWIC and by SARA
- ^ScListed as special concern by COSEWIC and by SARA
- ^ScbListed as special concern by COSEWIC and no status by SARA
- ^SccListed as not at risk by COSEWIC and special concern by SARA

== Other designations ==
East Bay/Native Bay is a Canadian Important Bird Area (#NU023) and a Key Migratory Bird Terrestrial Habitat (NU Site 44).
