= Ikkattuaq Migratory Bird Sanctuary =

Migratory bird sanctuary in Nunavut, Canada

- Harry Gibbons Migratory Bird Sanctuary
- IUCN category Ib (wilderness area)
- Location within Nunavut Location within Canada
- Location: Southampton Island, Kivalliq, Nunavut, Canada
- Nearest town: Coral Harbor
- Coordinates: 63°45′N 85°40′W
- Area: 143,811 ha (355,360 acres)
- Established: 1959

The Ikkattuaq Migratory Bird Sanctuary formerly the Harry Gibbons Migratory Bird Sanctuary is a migratory bird sanctuary in Kivalliq Region, Nunavut, Canada. It is located on the southwest coast Southampton Island in the area of the Boas River and Bay of Gods Mercy.

The Sanctuary was established 1 January 1959, and consisting of 149,500 hectares,. Of its 1,224 km^{2} (473 sq mi) in overall size, 78 km^{2} (30 sq mi) is a marine area with marine, intertidal, and subtidal components.

The sanctuary was named after Harry Gibbons Ohnainewk (c. 1900–1954), a local Inuk hunter and guide whose journals provided valuable weather data, especially on wind.

It is one of two bird sanctuaries on the island, the other being the Qaqsauqtuuq Migratory Bird Sanctuary, situated 87 mi (140 km) to the northeast.

== Other designations ==
Along with its wetlands, the Boas River is a Canadian Important Bird Area (site #NU022). The Harry Gibbons MBS takes up the western portion of the IBA.
