= Minuto (surname) =

Minuto may refer to:

- Alessandro Minuto-Rizzo (born 1940), Italian diplomat
- Anna Carmela Minuto (born 1969), Italian politician
- Martino Minuto (born 1988), Italian-Turkish fencer

== See also ==
- Minuto, TV programme in the Philippines
- Minto (disambiguation)
- Minute
