= Boas River =

Location
- Country: Canada
- Territory: Nunavut

Physical characteristics
- Source
  - coordinates: 63°43′0″N 85°44′59″W
- Mouth
  - location: Bay of Gods Mercy, Nunavut
  - elevation: 0 m (0 ft)

Boas River is also a name for the Çoruh River in northeast Anatolia.

The Boas is a river on Southampton Island in Nunavut, Canada. The river rises at 64°49′58″N 084°23′34″W and its mouth is located at the Bay of Gods Mercy. Proceeding inland, the river becomes braided and is about 5 kilometres (3.1 mi) wide.

It is named after anthropologist Franz Boas.

== Flora ==
There are rich sedge meadows in the river's 2 mi (3.2 km)-wide delta area.

== Fauna ==
Bearded seal, bowhead whale, harbor seal, narwhal, polar bear, ringed seal, walrus, and white whale frequent the area.

Boas River and associated wetlands is a Canadian Important Bird Area, site #NU022 (63.75°N 85.66°W). The elevation varies from 0 m (0 ft) to 60 m (200 ft) above sea level. The IBA is 5,402 km^{2} (2,086 sq mi) in size. The Ikkattuaq Migratory Bird Sanctuary encompasses one third of the IBA's western portion.

This is a notable breeding area for the lesser snow goose. Other bird species include: American golden plover, Arctic loon, Atlantic brant, Canada goose, herring gull, jaegers, king eider, Lapland longspur, oldsquaw, red phalarope, red-throated loon, Ross's goose, tundra swan, sandhill crane, semipalmated plover, semipalmated sandpiper, and white-rumped sandpiper.

== History ==
The area was populated by Sadlermiut until the early 20th century when they were wiped out by an epidemic.

== See also ==
- List of rivers of Nunavut
