= East Bay (Nunavut) =

Bay in Nunavut, Canada

- Location within Nunavut
- Location: Hudson Bay
- Coordinates: 64°04′N 81°40′W
- Ocean/sea sources: Arctic Ocean
- Basin countries: Canada
- Surface area: 286 km^{2} (110 sq mi)
- Settlements: Uninhabited

East Bay is a waterway in the Kivalliq Region, Nunavut, Canada. It is located in Hudson Bay off eastern Southampton Island. Caribou Island lies to the north of the bay's mouth. The nearest community is Coral Harbour, 35 km (22 mi) to the west.

== Geography ==
The habitat consists of three main types, water, unvegetated land, and moist or wet vegetated tundra. This can be further broken down as dry heath, gravel ridge, intertidal zone, moss carpet, scrub willow, and sedge meadow. The elevation rises up to 122 m (400 ft) above sea level.

== Climate ==
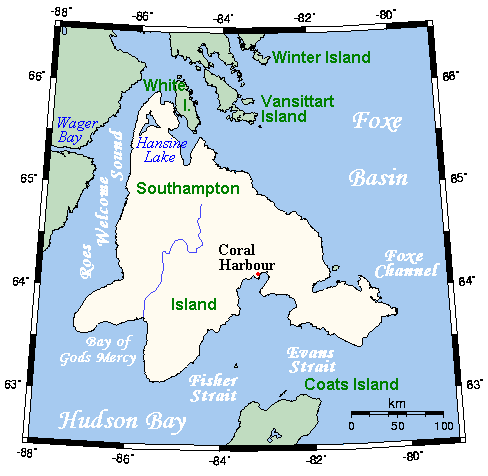
Closeup of Southampton Island

Southampton Island has a severe subarctic climate (Köppen Dfc) which transitions into a tundra climate (ET). Like almost all of Nunavut, Southampton Island is entirely above the tree line. Coral Harbour has never gone above freezing in January, February and March (although the latter has recorded 0.0 °C (32.0 °F). Due to the frozen nature of Hudson Bay, there is a severe seasonal lag until June, especially compared to more continental areas such as Fairbanks despite much sunshine and perpetual twilight at night. Due to the drop of solar strength and the absence of warm water even in summer, temperatures still drop off very fast as September approaches. Cold extremes are severe, but in line with many areas even farther south in Canada's interior.

Climate data for Coral Harbour (Coral Harbour Airport) WMO ID: 71915; coordinates 64°11′36″N 83°21′34″W; elevation: 62.2 m (204 ft); 1991–2020 normals, extremes 1933−present
Month	Jan	Feb	Mar	Apr	May	Jun	Jul	Aug	Sep	Oct	Nov	Dec	Year
Record high humidex	0.2	−1.9	−0.5	4.4	8.9	23.1	32.8	30.1	19.9	7.6	3.7	3.2	32.8
Record high °C (°F)	0.6 (33.1)	−1.1 (30.0)	0.0 (32.0)	5.0 (41.0)	9.4 (48.9)	23.5 (74.3)	28.0 (82.4)	26.1 (79.0)	18.5 (65.3)	7.6 (45.7)	4.0 (39.2)	3.4 (38.1)	28.0 (82.4)
Mean daily maximum °C (°F)	−24.9 (−12.8)	−25.6 (−14.1)	−20.2 (−4.4)	−11.0 (12.2)	−2.5 (27.5)	6.9 (44.4)	14.8 (58.6)	12.1 (53.8)	4.8 (40.6)	−2.5 (27.5)	−11.2 (11.8)	−19.2 (−2.6)	−6.5 (20.3)
Daily mean °C (°F)	−29.0 (−20.2)	−29.7 (−21.5)	−24.9 (−12.8)	−16.1 (3.0)	−6.0 (21.2)	3.5 (38.3)	10.2 (50.4)	8.2 (46.8)	2.0 (35.6)	−5.5 (22.1)	−15.5 (4.1)	−23.4 (−10.1)	−10.5 (13.1)
Mean daily minimum °C (°F)	−33.2 (−27.8)	−33.7 (−28.7)	−29.7 (−21.5)	−21.1 (−6.0)	−9.6 (14.7)	0.1 (32.2)	5.6 (42.1)	4.2 (39.6)	−0.8 (30.6)	−8.6 (16.5)	−19.8 (−3.6)	−27.6 (−17.7)	−14.5 (5.9)
Record low °C (°F)	−52.8 (−63.0)	−51.4 (−60.5)	−49.4 (−56.9)	−39.4 (−38.9)	−31.1 (−24.0)	−15.6 (3.9)	−1.1 (30.0)	−3.3 (26.1)	−17.2 (1.0)	−34.4 (−29.9)	−40.6 (−41.1)	−48.9 (−56.0)	−52.8 (−63.0)
Record low wind chill	−69.5	−69.3	−64.3	−55.1	−39.7	−23.2	−8.2	−11.8	−23.7	−43.7	−54.8	−64.2	−69.5
Average precipitation mm (inches)	10.9 (0.43)	—	9.6 (0.38)	18.2 (0.72)	19.9 (0.78)	28.0 (1.10)	34.8 (1.37)	61.7 (2.43)	44.9 (1.77)	36.6 (1.44)	23.3 (0.92)	—	—
Average rainfall mm (inches)	0.0 (0.0)	—	0.0 (0.0)	0.5 (0.02)	5.4 (0.21)	22.6 (0.89)	34.8 (1.37)	61.4 (2.42)	35.6 (1.40)	8.4 (0.33)	0.3 (0.01)	—	—
Average snowfall cm (inches)	—	11.2 (4.4)	—	9.6 (3.8)	18.1 (7.1)	14.8 (5.8)	5.4 (2.1)	0.0 (0.0)	0.0 (0.0)	7.8 (3.1)	28.1 (11.1)	22.9 (9.0)	—
Average precipitation days (≥ 0.2 mm)	9.4	—	8.7	9.7	10.6	10.2	9.8	13.0	12.0	15.4	14.0	—	—
Average rainy days (≥ 0.2 mm)	0.0	—	0.06	0.13	2.2	7.9	9.8	13.0	8.6	4.0	0.55	—	—
Average snowy days (≥ 0.2 cm)	9.2	—	8.7	9.7	9.4	3.4	0.0	0.0	4.1	14.0	13.4	—	—
Average relative humidity (%) (at 1500 LST)	67.4	66.4	69.2	74.5	80.3	73.1	62.8	69.1	75.8	85.5	79.7	72.0	73.0
Mean monthly sunshine hours	37.9	112.1	187.4	240.2	239.9	262.2	312.3	220.4	109.8	70.8	47.9	18.8	1,859.7
Percentage possible sunshine	22.4	47.0	51.6	53.2	42.0	41.9	51.2	43.3	27.9	23.3	24.3	13.9	36.8
Source: Environment and Climate Change Canada (sun 1981–2010)

== Fauna ==
Located here is Qaqsauqtuuq Migratory Bird Sanctuary which is an Important Bird Area. It is designated as a migratory bird sanctuary, and Key Migratory Bird Terrestrial Habitat.

The bird sanctuary was established 1 January 1959, and consisting of 112,811 ha (1,128.11 km^{2}; 435.57 mi^{2}) it is rated Category IV by the International Union for Conservation of Nature. Of its 1,124 km^{2} (434 sq mi) in overall size, 286 km^{2} (110 sq mi) is a marine area with marine, intertidal, and subtidal components.

=== Marine mammals ===
Marine mammals found in the bay include Atlantic walrus (Odobenus rosmarus rosmarus^{Scb}), bearded seal (Erignathus barbatus), beluga whale (Delphinapterus leucas^{Scb}), bowhead whale (Balaena mysticetus^{Scb}), harbor seal (Phoca vitulina), harp seal (Pagophilus groenlandicus), narwhal (Monodon monoceros^{Scb}), polar bear (Ursus maritimus), ringed seal (Pusa hispida^{Scb}), walrus (Odobenus rosmarus).

- ^ScbListed as special concern by COSEWIC and no status by SARA
