= Goodfriend =

Goodfriend is a surname. It may refer to:

- David Goodfriend (born 1968), American attorney
- Lynda Goodfriend (born 1953), American actress
- Marvin Goodfriend (1950–2019), American professor

It may also refer to:

- The bonus disc for the 2006 release of Girlfriend by Matthew Sweet.

== See also ==
- Gutfreund
