= Dorsets =

Dorsets may refer to:

- Dorset culture
- Dorset Regiment
