= Mount Minto =

Mount Minto may refer to

- the former name of K'iyán Mountain in British Columbia, Canada
- Mount Minto (Nunavut) in Nunavut, Canada
- Mount Minto (Antarctica) in Antarctica
