= Walrus Island =

Walrus Island may refer to:

== Canada ==
- Walrus Island (Fisher Strait), Nunavut
- Walrus Island (Hudson Bay), Nunavut
- Walrus Island (Kiluhiqtuq), Nunavut

== Greenland ==
- Walrus Island (Greenland) in the Pendulum Islands

== Norway ==
- Walross-Insel, former German name variant of Hopen Island, Svalbard archipelago, Norway

== United States ==
- Walrus Island (Pribilof Islands), in the Bering Sea, Alaska
- Walrus and Kritskoi Islands located in the southeastern shores of the Bristol Bay in the Aleutians East Borough, Alaska
- Walrus Islands in the "Walrus Islands State Game Sanctuary", located close to Hagemeister Island in the Dillingham Census Area, Alaska
