= Bell Peninsula =

Peninsula in Kivalliq Region, Canada

Coordinates: 63°45′N 081°30′W

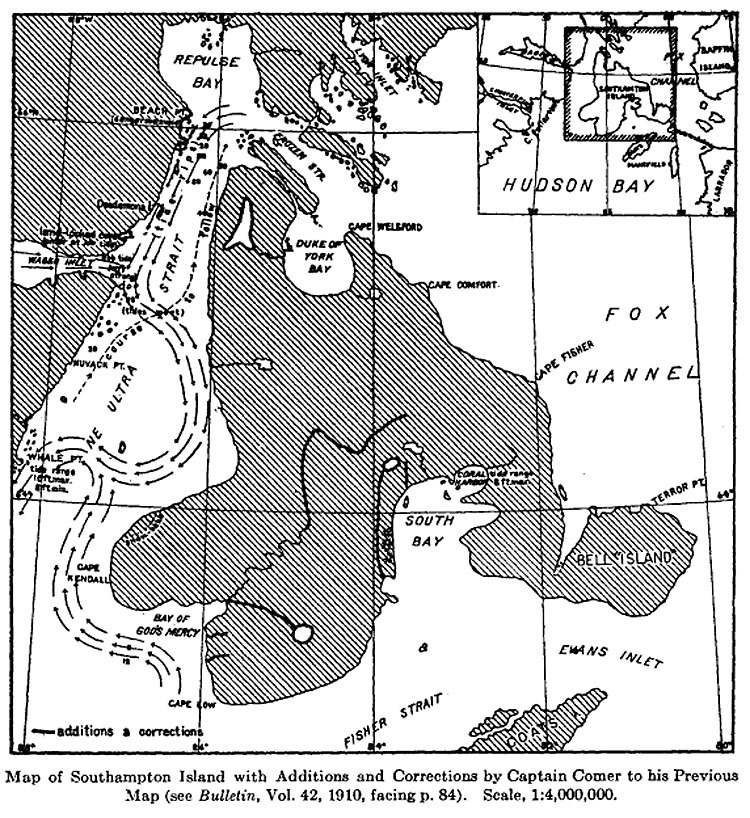
1913 map by George Comer. Bell Peninsula is still referred to as an island, but is charted as a peninsula of Southampton Island.

The Bell Peninsula (previously known as Bell Island) is located on southeastern Southampton Island, in the Kivalliq Region, Nunavut, Canada. It is close to the small Inuit community of Coral Harbour. The southern shores make up the northern boundary of Hudson Bay. Foxe Basin is to the east. There are several large bays surrounding the peninsula. Bowhead whale frequent the area. The Bell Peninsula's irregular coastline is marked by five distinct points, some of which have notable archaeological sites. Mount Minto, in the north, is the highest peak. The Back Peninsula is on the eastern end of the Bell Peninsula.

== History ==
The peninsula is named in honor of John Bell, Hudson's Bay Company governor and explorer.

The Dorset culture Sadlermiut lived on the Bell Peninsula and elsewhere on Southampton Island until disease drove them to extinction in 1902. Thereafter, Inuit arrived. The Native Point archaeological site, located on the peninsula's Native Bay is the largest Sadlermiut site on the island.

In 1910, Captain George Comer re-charted Southampton Island and rectified the mistake on previous maps that depicted the peninsula as an island.
