= Back Peninsula =

Peninsula in Nunavut, Canada

Coordinates: 63°43′19″N 080°11′39″W

Location in Nunavut

The Back Peninsula (alternate names, Back Island, or Black Island) is a cape located on eastern Bell Peninsula, Southampton Island, in the Kivalliq Region, Nunavut, Canada. Its southern shore is part of the northern boundary of Hudson Bay. Foxe Basin is to the north. There are two large bays, Gorden Bay and Junction Bay. Bowhead whale frequent the area. The Bell Peninsula's irregular coastline is marked by Seashore Point and Expectation Point.

== History ==
The peninsula is named in honour of Arctic explorer, Sir George Back.
