= Gutfreund =

Gutfreund (Hebrew: גוטפרוינד) is a surname of German origin. Notable people with the surname include:

- Amir Gutfreund (1963-2015), Israeli writer
- Hanoch Gutfreund, Israeli Andre Aisenstadt Chair in theoretical physics, and former President, of the Hebrew University of Jerusalem
- Herbert Gutfreund (1921–2021), British biochemist
- John Gutfreund (1929–2016), American businessman
- Otto Gutfreund (1889–1927), Czech sculptor
- Yossef Gutfreund (1932–1972), Israeli wrestling coach and referee who was killed in the Munich massacre at the 1972 Olympic Games
- Andre R. Guttfreund (born 1946), Salvadoran film director and producer

== See also ==
- Goodfriend
