= Mathiassen Mountain =

Mountain in Nunavut, Canada

- Location within Nunavut Location within Canada

Highest point
- Elevation: 611 m (2,005 ft)
- Prominence: 611 m (2,005 ft)
- Isolation: 343.43 km (213.40 mi)
- Coordinates: 64°49′49″N 83°36′08″W

Geography
- Location: Kivalliq Region; Nunavut, Canada
- Parent range: Porsild Mountains

Mathiassen Mountain is a mountain summit, the tallest on Southampton Island, in the Canadian territory of Nunavut.
