= Dorset culture =

Paleo-Eskimo culture (500 BCE–1500 CE)

- Geographical range: Northern Canada, Greenland
- Dates: 500 BCE – 1500 CE
- Preceded by: Pre-Dorset
- Followed by: Thule people

The Dorset was a Paleo-Eskimo culture, lasting from 500 BCE to between 1000 CE and 1500 CE, that followed the Pre-Dorset and preceded the Thule people (proto-Inuit) in the North American Arctic. The culture and people are named after Cape Dorset (now Kinngait) in Nunavut and Newfoundland & Labrador, Canada, where the first physical evidence of its existence was found by western science. The culture has been defined as having four phases due to the distinct differences in the technologies relating to hunting and tool making. Artifacts include distinctive triangular end-blades, oil lamps (qulliq) made of soapstone, and burins.

The Dorset were first identified as a separate culture in 1925. The Dorset appear to have been extinct by 1500 at the latest and perhaps as early as 1000. The Thule people, who began migrating east from Alaska in the 11th century, ended up spreading through the lands previously inhabited by the Dorset. Some modern genetic studies show the Dorset population were distinct from later groups and that "there was virtually no evidence of genetic or cultural interaction between the Dorset and the Thule peoples."

Inuit legends recount them encountering people they called the Tuniit (in syllabics: ᑐᓃᑦ, singular ᑐᓂᖅ Tuniq). According to legend, the first inhabitants were giants, taller and stronger than Inuit but afraid to interact and "easily put to flight".

== Discovery ==
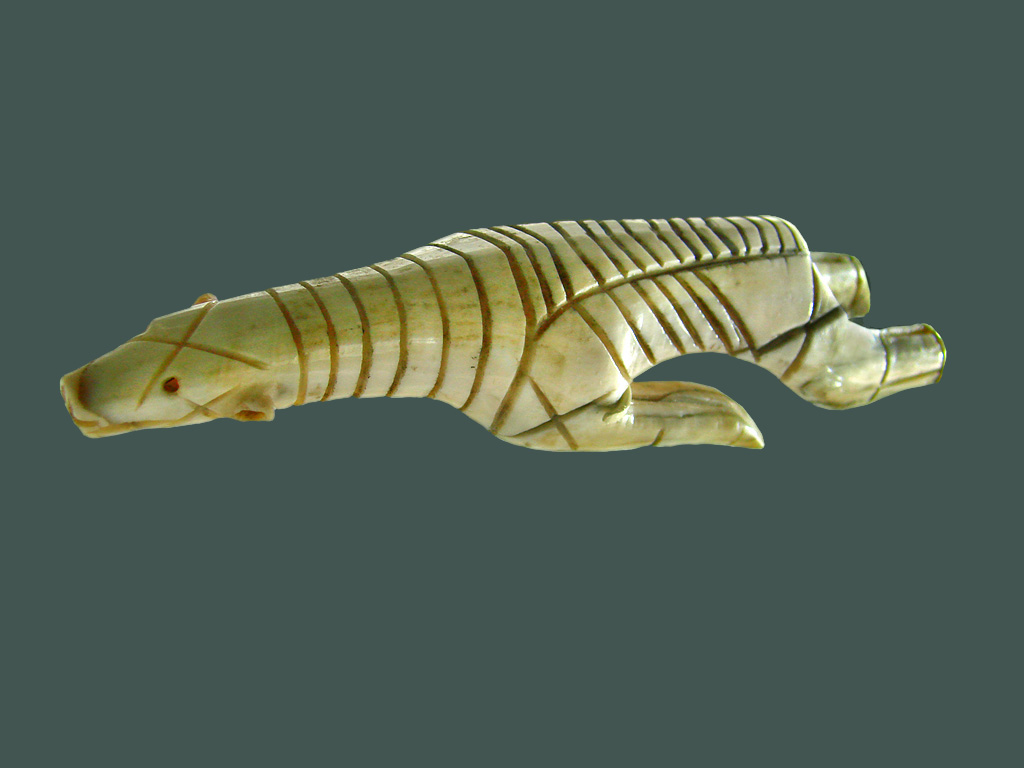
Dorset carving of a polar bear found on Igloolik Island

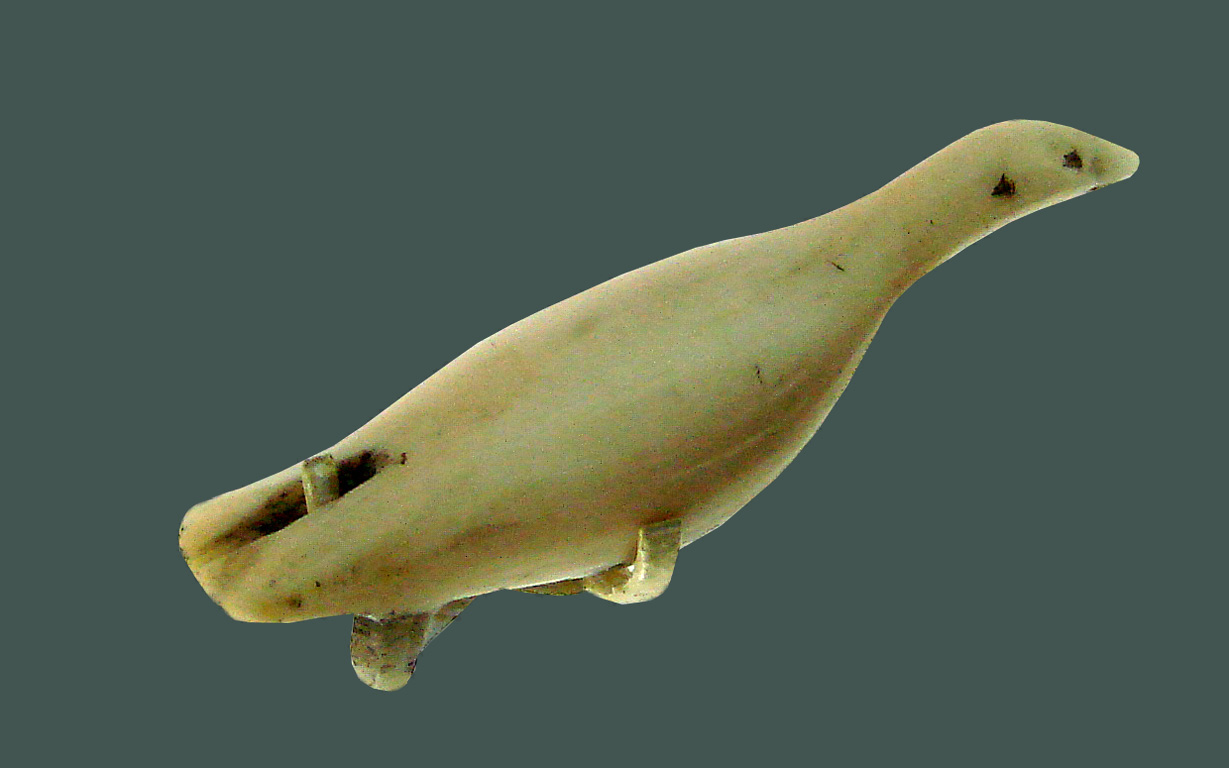
Dorset carving of a seal

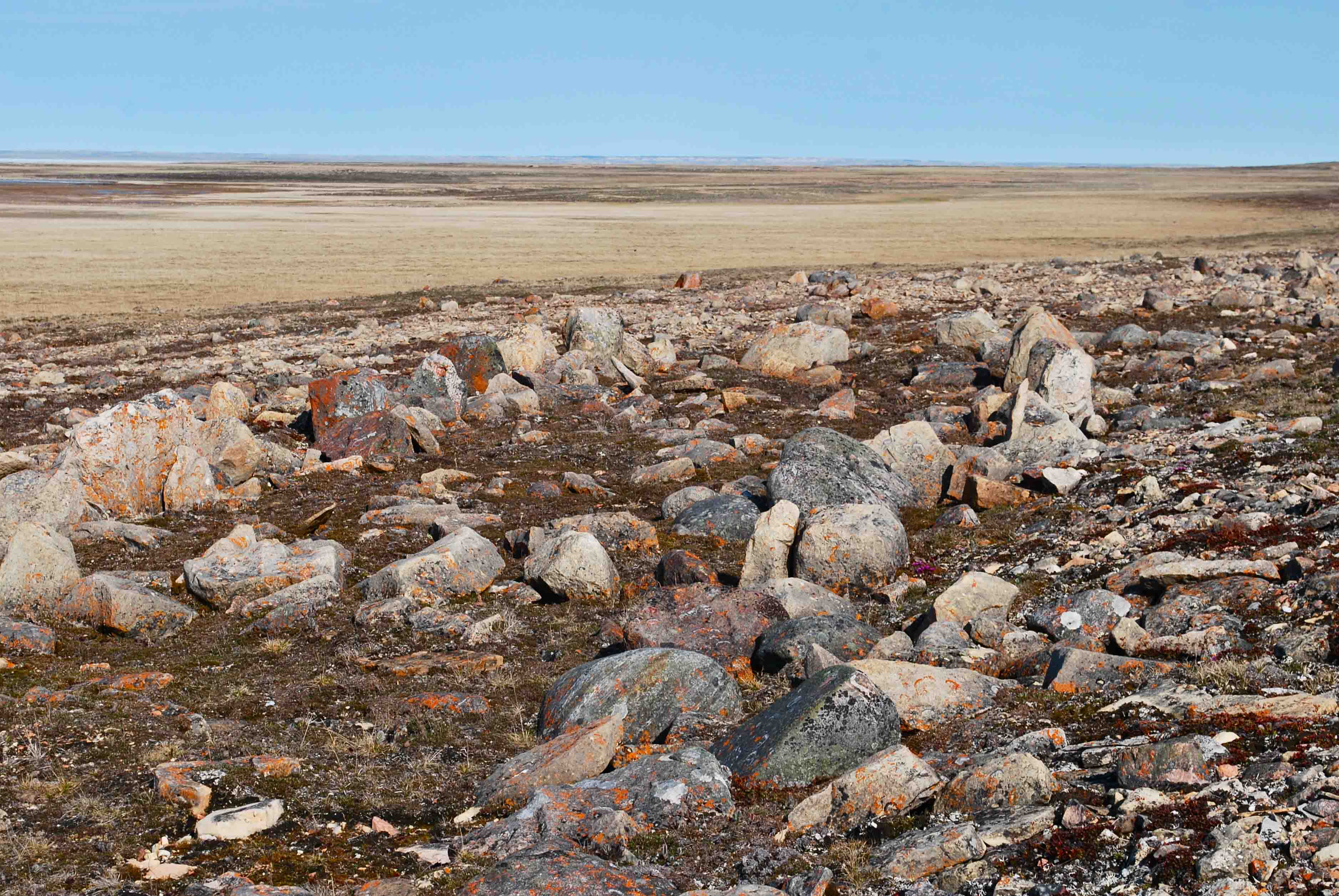
Stone remains of a Dorset longhouse near Cambridge Bay, Nunavut

In 1925, Diamond Jenness, a New Zealand born Canadian anthropologist, received artifacts from Cape Dorset, now Kinngait. As they were quite different from those of the Inuit, he speculated that they were indicative of an ancient, preceding culture. Jenness named the culture "Dorset" after the location of the find. These artifacts showed a consistent and distinct cultural pattern that included sophisticated art distinct from that of the Inuit. For example, the carvings featured uniquely large hairstyles for women, and figures of both sexes wearing hoodless parkas with large, tall collars. Much research since then has revealed many details of the Dorset people and their culture.

== History ==
=== Origins ===
The origins of the Dorset people are not well understood. They may have developed from the previous cultures of Pre-Dorset, Saqqaq or (less likely) Independence I cultures. There are, however, problems with this theory: these earlier cultures had bow and arrow technology which the Dorsets lacked. Possibly, due to a shift from terrestrial to aquatic hunting, or the deaths of those who possessed the knowledge, the bow and arrow became lost to the Dorset. Another piece of technology that is missing from the Dorset are bow drills: there are no drill holes in Dorset artifacts. Instead, the Dorset gouged lenticular holes. For example, bone needles have long, narrow holes that were painstakingly carved or gouged. Both the Pre-Dorset and Thule (Inuit) had drills.

=== Historical and cultural periods ===
Map showing the decline of the Dorset culture and expansion of the Thule (900 to 1500 CE)

Dorset culture and history is divided into periods: the early (500–1 BCE), middle (1–500 CE), and late phases (500–1000 CE), as well as perhaps a terminal phase (from c. 1000 onwards). The terminal phase, if it existed, would likely be closely related to the onset of the Medieval Warm Period, which started to warm the Arctic considerably around the mid-10th century. With the warmer climates, the sea ice became less predictable and was isolated from the High Arctic.

The Dorset were highly adapted to living in a very cold climate, and much of their food is thought to have been from hunting sea mammals that breathe through holes in the ice. The massive decline in sea-ice which the Medieval Warm Period produced would have strongly affected the Dorset. They could have followed the ice north. Most of the evidence suggests that they disappeared some time between 1000 and 1500. Radiocarbon dating has shown the Dorset were living in the Cambridge Bay area as late as 1350 CE, while the Thule Inuit moved into the area around 1200 CE. Artifacts of the Dorset can be found all over the north.

== Technology ==
The Dorset Parallel harpoon head: one of the most common among the Dorset

The Dorset adaptation was different from that of the whaling-based Thule Inuit. Unlike Inuit, they rarely hunted land animals, such as polar bears and caribou. They did not use bows or arrows. Instead, they seem to have relied on seals and other sea mammals that they apparently hunted from holes in the ice. Their clothing must have been adapted to the extreme conditions.

Triangular end-blades and burins are diagnostic of the Dorset. The end-blades were hafted onto harpoon heads. They primarily used the harpoons to hunt seal, but also hunted larger sea mammals such as walrus and narwhals. They made lamps, called qulliq, from soapstone and filled them with seal oil. Burins were a type of stone flake with a chisel-like edge. They were probably either used for engraving or for carving wood or bone. Burins were also used by Pre-Dorset groups and had a distinctive mitten shape.

The Dorset were highly skilled at making refined miniature carvings, and striking masks. Both indicate an active shamanistic tradition. The Dorset culture was remarkably homogeneous across the Canadian Arctic, but there were some important variations which have been noted in both Greenland and Newfoundland / Labrador regions.

== Interaction with Inuit ==
There appears to be no genetic connection between the Dorset and Thule who replaced them. Archaeological and legendary evidence is often thought to support some cultural contact, but this has been questioned. The Dorset people, for instance, may have engaged in seal-hole hunting, a method which requires several steps and includes the use of dogs. The Thule apparently did not use this technique in the time they had previously spent in Alaska. Settlement pattern data has been used to claim that the Dorset also extensively used a breathing-hole sealing technique and perhaps they would have taught it to Inuit. But this has been questioned on the grounds that no evidence has been identified that the Dorset had dogs.

Inuit oral history recounts encounters with a people called the Tuniit upon their arrival; they were described as gentle and shy, speaking a simple language referred to as "Kutak" or "baby-talk". Like the Dorset, they did not possess bows or arrows and were easily killed or driven away. They were described as living scattered amid the vast Arctic landscape but coming together at certain times for celebration or survival. How these legends prove meaningful contact with the Dorset is uncertain: some scientists have suggested that they disappeared because they were unable to adapt to climate change or were vulnerable to newly introduced diseases.

According to an Inuk from Ivaluardjuk, Igloolik, in 1922:

The Tunit were a strong people, and yet they were driven from their villages by others who were more numerous, by many people of great ancestors; but so greatly did they love their country that when they were leaving Uglit there was a man who, out of desperate love for his village, harpooned the rocks and made the stones fly about like bits of ice.

Some Inuit elders describe peace with an ancient group of people whilst others describe conflict.

=== Sadlermiut ===
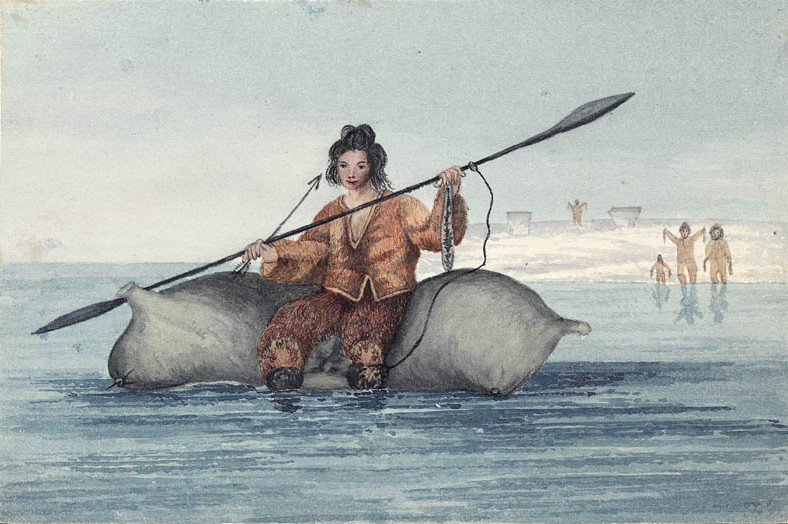
Drawing of a Sadlermiut man paddling on inflated seal skins (George Francis Lyon; 1824)

Scholars had thought that the Sadlermiut, a people living in near isolation mainly on and around Coats Island, Walrus Island and Southampton Island in Hudson Bay up until 1902–03, might have been the last remnants of the Dorset culture, as they had a culture and dialect distinct from the mainland Inuit. Encounters with Europeans and exposure to infectious disease caused the deaths of the last members of the Sadlermiut.

A 2002 paper suggested that the mitochondrial DNA (mtDNA) of Sadlermiut people was related to that of both the Dorset and Thule peoples, perhaps suggesting local admixture.

A subsequent 2012 genetic analysis, however, showed no genetic link between the Sadlermiut and the Dorset.

== Genetics ==
A genetic study published in Science in August 2014 examined the remains of nineteen Dorset people buried in Canada and Greenland between c. 170 BCE and 1320 CE. The sixteen samples of mtDNA extracted were determined to belong to haplogroup D2a1 (twelve samples), D2a (three samples) and D. These haplogroups also predominate in the preceding Saqqaq culture, suggesting genetic continuity between the two. The authors of the study suggested that the ancestors of the Saqqaq and Dorset entered North America from Siberia in a single distinct migration about 4000 BCE, after which they remained genetically largely isolated for thousands of years. The Dorset were genetically distinct from the Thule people who, after expanding out of Siberia, completely replaced the Dorset people around 1300 CE. The study also found no evidence of genetic mixing between Dorset people and the Greenlandic Norse people.

A scientific study published in Nature in 2019 showed that a significant part of the genetic heritage of ancient and modern populations in the American Arctic and the Chukchi Peninsula comes from Paleo-Eskimos. This includes people who speak Eskimo-Aleut languages, such as Yupik, Inuit, and Aleut, as well as groups who speak Na-Dene languages, including Athabaskan and Tlingit speakers in Canada, Alaska, and the contiguous United States. According to the researchers' analysis, Paleo-Eskimos interbred with people of a similar ancestry to those of more southern Native American peoples shortly after arriving in Alaska between 5,000 and 4,000 years ago. The genetic heritage of Aleutian Islanders and Athabaskans is derived directly from this ancient mixture. Paleo-Eskimo ancestry is particularly widespread today among Na-Dene language speakers, including Athabaskan and Tlingit communities in Alaska, northern Canada, the US West Coast, and the southwestern US.

== See also ==
- Qajartalik

== Bibliography ==
- Fortescue, Michael; Jacobson, Steven; Kaplan, Lawrence (1994). Comparative Eskimo Dictionary: With Aleut Cognates. Alaska Native Language Center Research Paper 9. University of Alaska Fairbanks. ISBN 978-1-55500-109-4.
- McGhee, Robert (1996). Ancient people of the Arctic. Internet Archive. Vancouver, BC: UBC Press. ISBN 978-0-7748-0553-7.
- McGhee, Robert (2005). The Last Imaginary Place: A Human History of the Arctic World. Oxford University Press. ISBN 978-0-19-518368-9.
- McGhee, Robert (March 4, 2015). "Dorset Culture". The Canadian Encyclopedia. Historica Canada.
- Plummet, Patrick; Lebel, Serge (1997). "Dorset Tip Fluting: A Second 'American' Invention". Arctic Anthropology. 34 (2): 132–162. JSTOR 40316446.
- Raghavan, Maanasa; DeGiorgio, Michael; Albrechtsen, Anders; et al. (August 29, 2014). "The genetic prehistory of the New World Arctic". Science. 345 (6200) 1255832. Bibcode:2014Sci...34555832R. doi:10.1126/science.1255832. PMID 25170159. S2CID 353853.
- Renouf, M.A.P. (1999). "Prehistory of Newfoundland Hunter-Gatherers: Extinctions or Adaptations?". World Archaeology. 30 (3): 403–420. doi:10.1080/00438243.1999.9980420.
