= Walrus Island (Fisher Strait) =

Island in Nunavut, Canada

- Location within Nunavut Location within Canada

Geography
- Location: Hudson Bay
- Coordinates: 63°16′10″N 83°40′15″W
- Archipelago: Arctic Archipelago

Administration
- Canada
- Territory: Nunavut
- Region: Kivalliq

Demographics
- Population: Uninhabited

Walrus Island (Appatuuraarjuk or ᐊᑉᐸᑑᕌᕐᔪᒃ in Inuktitut) is an uninhabited Canadian arctic island in the Kivalliq Region, Nunavut. Located in Fisher Strait, it is situated between Southampton Island and Coats Island in northern Hudson Bay. Archaeological evidence indicates that the Sadlermiut were once active on the island.
