= Willkie Farr & Gallagher =

U.S.-based international law firm

Willkie Farr & Gallagher LLP
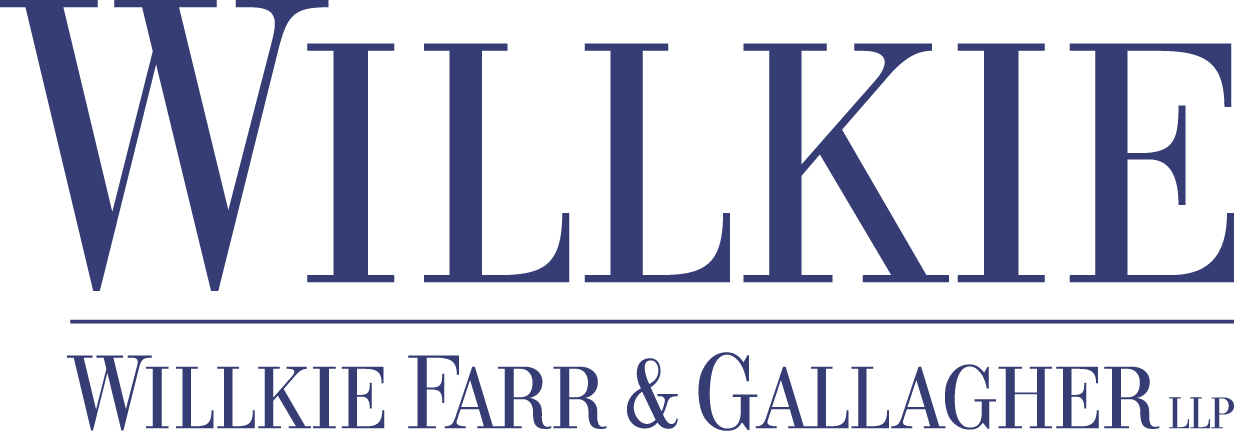
- Headquarters: AXA Equitable Center; 787 Seventh Avenue; New York, NY 10019
- No. of offices: 16 total; 8 international
- No. of attorneys: 1300 (2025)
- Major practice areas: Antitrust, Asset Management, Business Restructuring, Commercial Litigation, Corporate M&A, Insurance, Intellectual Property, Private Equity, Real Estate, Regulatory, Securities Litigation, Tax
- Key people: Matthew A. Feldman, co-chairman; Thomas M. Cerabino, co-chairman; Jeffrey R. Poss, incoming co-chairman
- Revenue: ▲$2.06 billion (2025)
- Date founded: 1888; 138 years ago
- Founder: William B. Hornblower and James Byrne
- Company type: Limited liability partnership
- Website: willkie.com

Willkie Farr & Gallagher LLP, commonly known as Willkie, is a white-shoe, international law firm headquartered in New York City. Founded in 1888, the firm specializes in corporate practice and employs approximately 1300 lawyers in 16 offices across six countries.

U.S. Supreme Court Justices Felix Frankfurter and Charles Evans Hughes began their careers at the firm, as did former Supreme Court nominee Robert Bork, and former New York Governor Mario Cuomo after leaving office. The law firm's profits per equity partner were $4.96 million in 2025.

== History ==
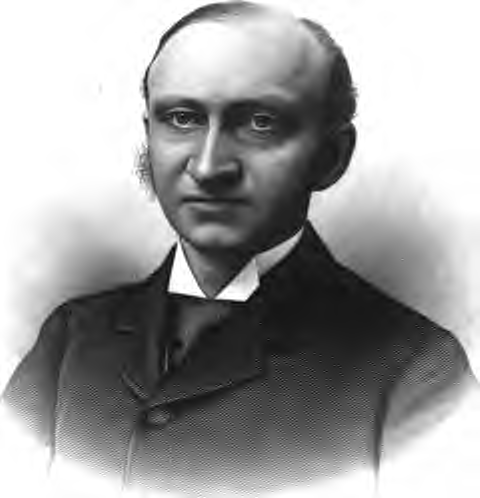
William B. Hornblower (1851–1914)

The firm was founded in 1888, with four lawyers. The firm started as Wall Street law firm Hornblower & Byrne, which was founded by William B. Hornblower and James Byrne, and was located in New York City. Hornblower was a prominent ally of President Grover Cleveland and rose to serve as President of the Association of the Bar of the City of New York, as well as sit as a judge on the New York Court of Appeals.

Early clients in the 1890s included the New York Life Insurance Company; the New York Securities and Trust Company (later the New York Trust Company); The Rome, Watertown, Ogdensburg and Parsons Railroad; Grant & Ward, a brokerage firm partnership between ex-President Ulysses S. Grant and Ferdinand Ward; the Otis Elevator Company; the United States Ship Building Company; and Thomas A. Edison.

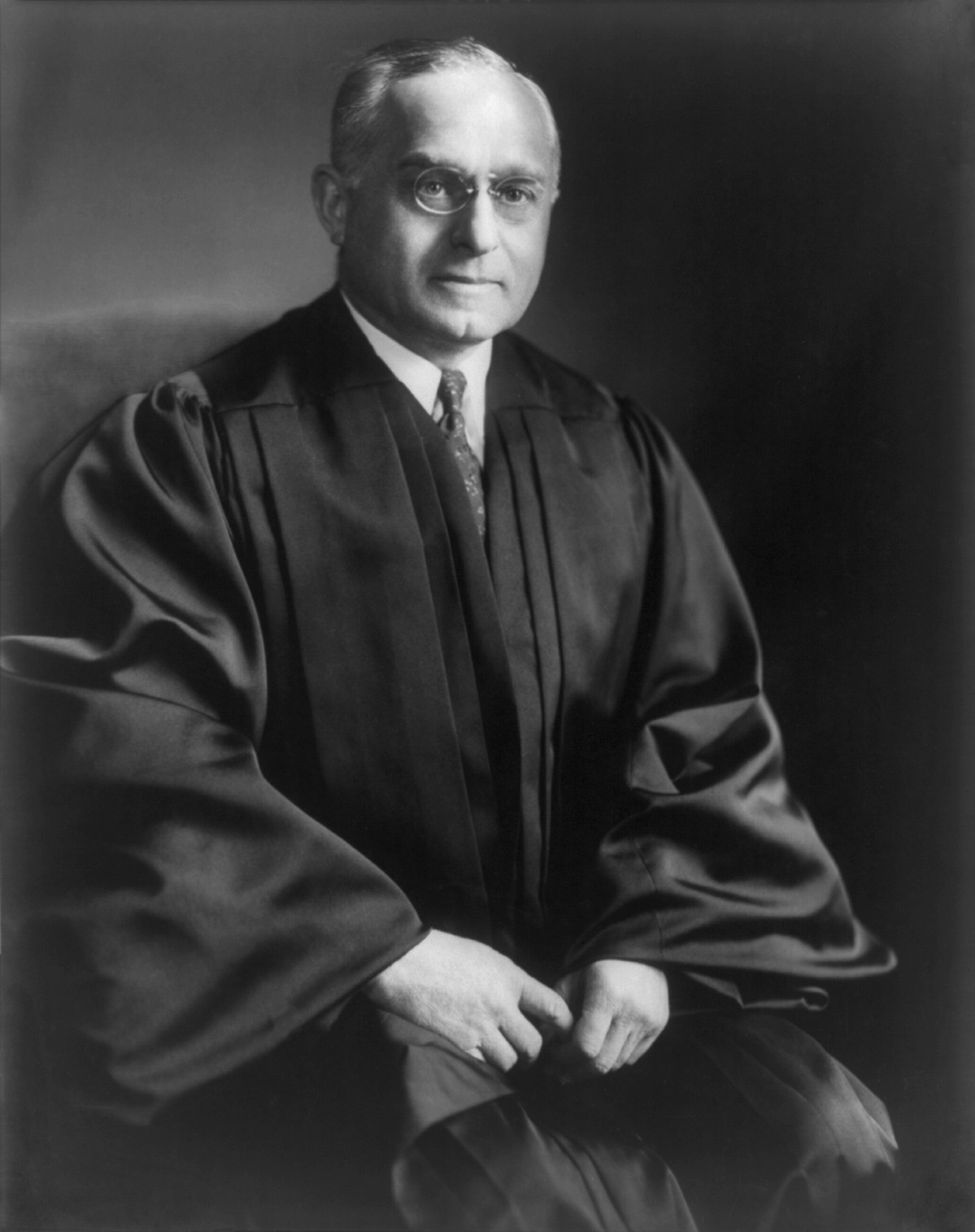
Felix Frankfurter

Two associates, Felix Frankfurter (who started his legal career at the firm in 1906) and Charles Evans Hughes, have served as Justices of the US Supreme Court, with Hughes serving as Chief Justice.

Two partners have served as American Bar Association President. The first was Charles A. Boston (who became an associate at the firm in 1901 when it was Hornblower, Byrne, Miller & Potter) in 1930–31. He was followed by Harold J. Gallagher (who initially joined the firm in 1917 when it was Hornblower, Miller & Garrison) in 1949–50.

In 1931, the firm merged with the law firm of Miller, Otis and Farr. At that point, in total the firm had 12 partners and 24 associates, making it one of New York's larger firms. In 1939, the firm hired its first female associate, Mary MacDonagh.

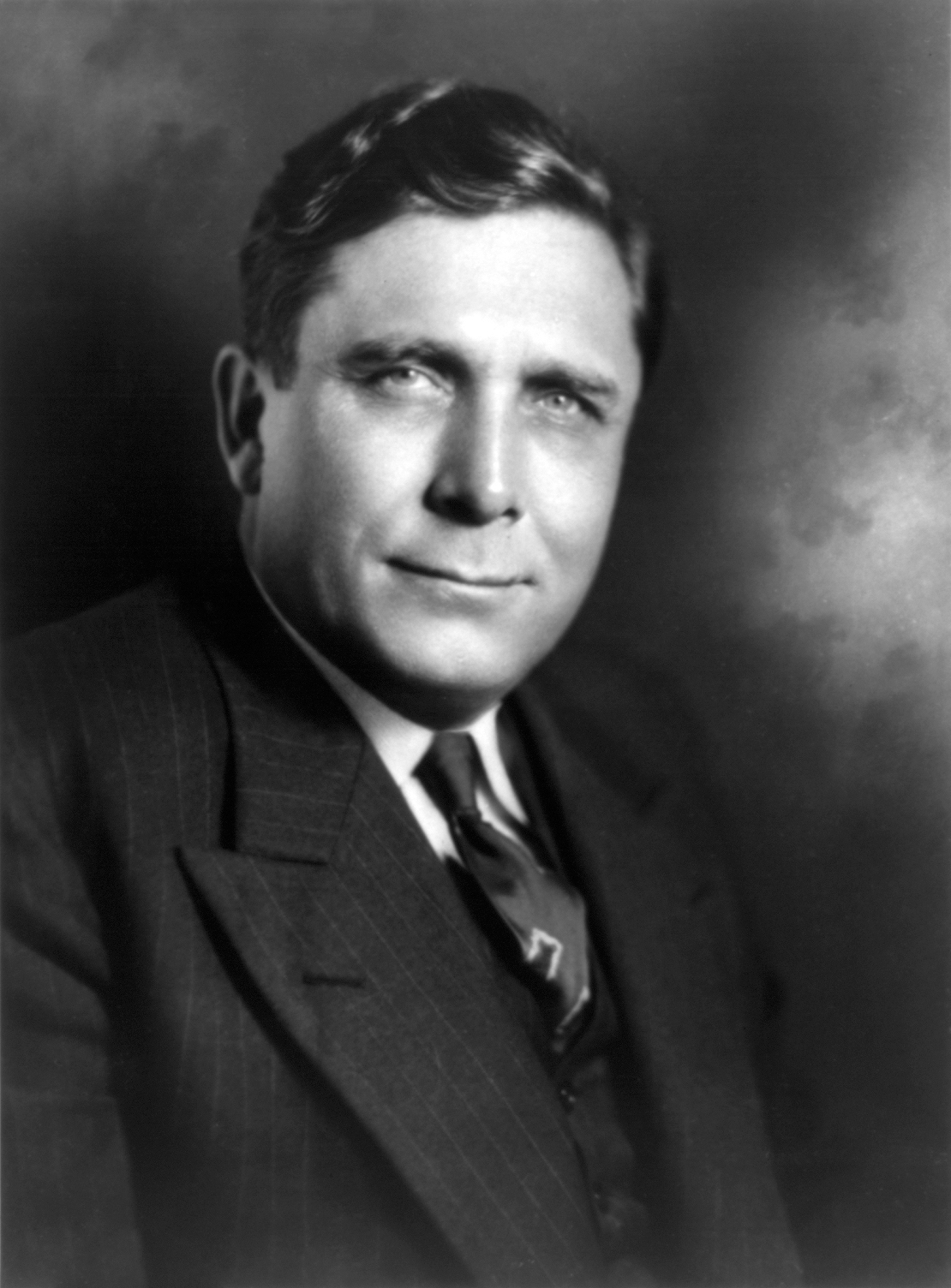
Wendell Willkie

In January 1940 Harold J. Gallagher, one of the most influential partners in the history of the firm, extended an offer to Wendell Willkie to join the firm then known as Miller, Boston & Owen. This was several months before Willkie received the Republican nomination for president. After losing the presidential election to the incumbent FDR, Willkie joined the firm and became a partner in 1941. The firm's name was changed a year later to Willkie, Owen, Otis & Bailly, and later to Willkie, Owen, Otis, Farr & Gallagher. Willkie later became F.D.R.'s personal envoy to many countries, promoting the Lend-Lease program. He later wrote a book about his travels entitled One World, a plea for global cooperation and peacekeeping. In 1947, his estate's interest in the law firm was valued at $125,000 ($1,802,000 in current dollar terms). That year, the customary hourly rate of a Willkie partner was $50 ($700 in current dollar terms) an hour.

Major clients during this period included insurance companies such as Metropolitan Life Insurance Company; New York Life; Equitable; Aetna; Connecticut General; John Hancock; and Prudential for which the firm represented for a number of industry private placements.

Throughout the 1960s, Gallagher-lead Willkie was occupied with railroad reorganizations, setting the stage for the firm's emergence as a bankruptcy powerhouse. In 1968 the firm adopted its current name, Willkie Farr & Gallagher. In 1977, Patricia S. Skigen became the firm's first female partner. That year, the firm moved to One Citicorp Center.

The firm was long known for its representation of Major League Baseball. Former Willkie Farr partner Bowie Kuhn served as Commissioner of Baseball from 1969 to 1984. Willkie Farr represented Major League Baseball in the famous Curt Flood free agency/antitrust case in the United States Supreme Court in 1970, and successfully litigated famous cases such as the Pine Tar Game in 1983 as well as, later in the 1980s, against Pete Rose regarding the highly publicized gambling case.

In 1993 Willkie suffered a precipitous drop in business when Shearson Lehman, which accounted for one-third of Willkie Farr billings, was sold to The Travelers Companies. The firm consequently adopted a policy that no client would account for more than five percent of its business.

In 1994, corporate partner Nora Ann Wallace became the first female member of the firm's executive committee. Beginning in 1995, and for the next two decades, Mario Cuomo (the former 52nd Governor of New York) was of counsel at Willkie Farr.

In 2003, carbon monoxide and smoke inhalation from a fire at a historic bed-and-breakfast in Charlottesville, Virginia, where members of the firm were staying on a recruiting trip, killed Willkie recruiting coordinators Trish Langlade and Billie Kelly.

In 2007, Willkie announced a strategic alliance with Dickson Minto, a boutique law firm with offices in London and Edinburgh that specializes in private equity, with both continuing to operate independently of each other.

In 2019, Gordon Caplan, then co-chairman of the firm, named 2018 “Dealmaker of the Year” by The American Lawyer, was indicted as a parent participant in the 2019 college admissions bribery scandal, for conspiracy to commit mail fraud and wire fraud; the firm placed him on indefinite leave the next day. A felony guilty plea deal was filed in March 2019, and he was sentenced to one month in prison.

The American Lawyer ranked Willkie Farr 47th in gross revenue, with $772 million in 2017, and in the 2018 Global 200 survey it was ranked the 57th-highest-grossing law firm in the world. It had 145 equity partners, and its profits per equity partner were $2.97 million, 17th-highest in the nation. In size, it was ranked the 68th-largest law firm in the United States.

In November 2023, amid a wave of antisemitic incidents at elite U.S. law schools, Willkie Farr & Gallagher was among a group of major law firms who sent a letter to top law school deans warning them that an escalation in incidents targeting Jewish students would have corporate hiring consequences.

Agreement to support Trump administration (2025)

On April 1, 2025, during the targeting of law firms and lawyers under the second Trump administration, Willkie agreed to a deal with President Donald Trump, committing to provide $100 million in pro bono legal work on behalf of causes endorsed by Trump. Under the reported terms of the deal, Willkie also agreed "not to engage in illegal diversity-related employment practices." Willkie's decision then stood in contrast to other law firms targeted for retaliation that had resisted the administration; a week later, several other law firms also capitulated to Trump's demands. In July 2026, the Department of Justice subpoenaed Wilkie in an investigation of the deal.

== Affiliations ==
In 2022, Willkie Farr & Gallagher was a founding member of the Legal Alliance for Reproductive Rights, a coalition of United States law firms offering free legal services to people seeking and providing abortions in the wake of Dobbs v. Jackson Women's Health Organization, which overruled Roe v. Wade.

== Notable people ==
=== Academia ===
- Robert Bork – Professor, Yale Law School; Solicitor General of the United States; judge on the U.S. Court of Appeals for the D.C. Circuit
- Danielle Citron – Professor, University of Virginia School of Law
- Roberta Karmel – first female SEC Commissioner, Centennial Professor of Law & Co-Director, Center for the Study of International Business Law, Brooklyn Law School
- Pamela Samuelson – Distinguished Professor & Director, Berkeley Center for Law & Technology; U.C. Berkeley School of Law
- Harold Wren – Dean and Professor of Law, the Brandeis School of Law at the University of Louisville, the Northwestern School of Law, Lewis & Clark College (1969–72), and the T.C. Williams School of Law at the University of Richmond.

=== Government service ===
- Norman Bay – U.S. Attorney for the District of New Mexico; first Chinese-American U.S. Attorney; Chairman of the Federal Energy Regulatory Commission.
- Mario Cuomo – the 52nd Governor of New York, the Lieutenant Governor of New York, and the Secretary of State of New York.
- Lindley Miller Garrison – U.S. Secretary of War during World War I
- David Goodfriend – Deputy Staff Secretary to President Bill Clinton
- Charles Evans Hughes – U.S. Secretary of State; 36th Governor of New York
- Craig Johnson – New York State Senator
- Sean Patrick Maloney – Ambassador to the OECD & United States Representative for New York's 18th District
- Nathan L. Miller – 43rd Governor of New York
- Benito Romano – U.S. Attorney for the Southern District of New York; first Puerto Rican to hold the U.S. Attorney post
- Wendell Willkie – 1940 US presidential candidate, and author of One World
- Doug Emhoff – former Second Gentleman of the United States
- Michael S. Selig - Chair of the United States Commodity Futures Trading Commission and cryptocurrency corporate lawyer

=== Judiciary ===
- Felix Frankfurter – Associate Justice, U.S. Supreme Court
- Rachel Freier – Judge, New York City Criminal Court; first Hasidic Jewish woman to hold public office in United States history; was a paralegal at Willkie Farr.
- William Hornblower – Judge, New York Court of Appeals; Supreme Court nominee; President of New York City Bar Association
- Chester J. Straub – Judge, U.S. Court of Appeals for the Second Circuit

=== Miscellaneous ===
- Louis A. Craco – President, New York City Bar Association
- Bowie Kuhn – Major League Baseball (MLB) Commissioner
- Paul Mecurio – Emmy Award-winning comedian; writer on The Daily Show with Jon Stewart
- John Oller, historian, biographer, and true crime writer
- Susan Thomases – Personal counsel and adviser to Hillary Clinton

== Locations ==
The firm has 1,300 lawyers, in 16 offices in six countries (including offices in New York, Washington, D.C., Chicago, Dallas, Houston, Palo Alto, San Francisco, Los Angeles, Paris (created in 1925), London, Rome, Milan, Munich, Frankfurt, Hamburg and Brussels).

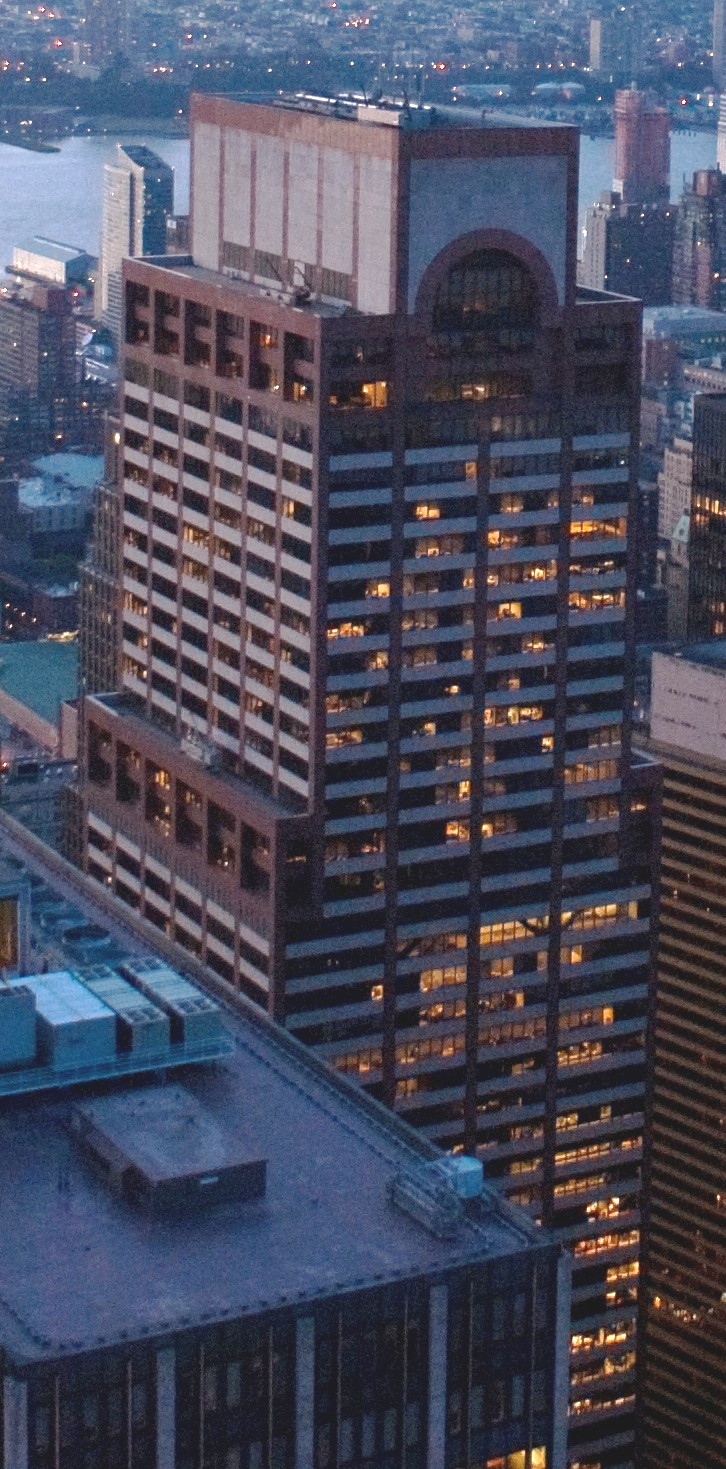
AXA Center,
New York City

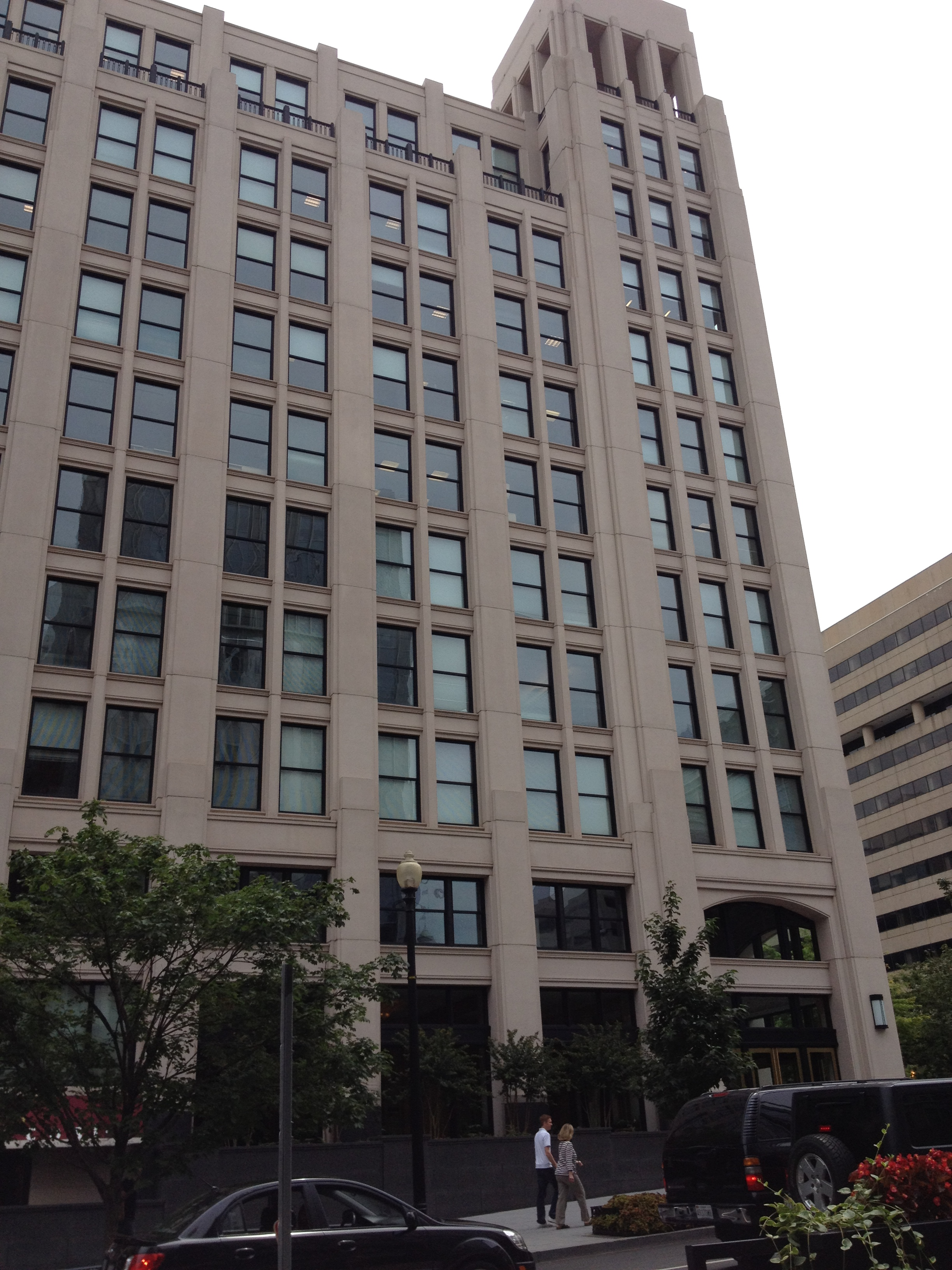
1875 K Street,
Washington DC

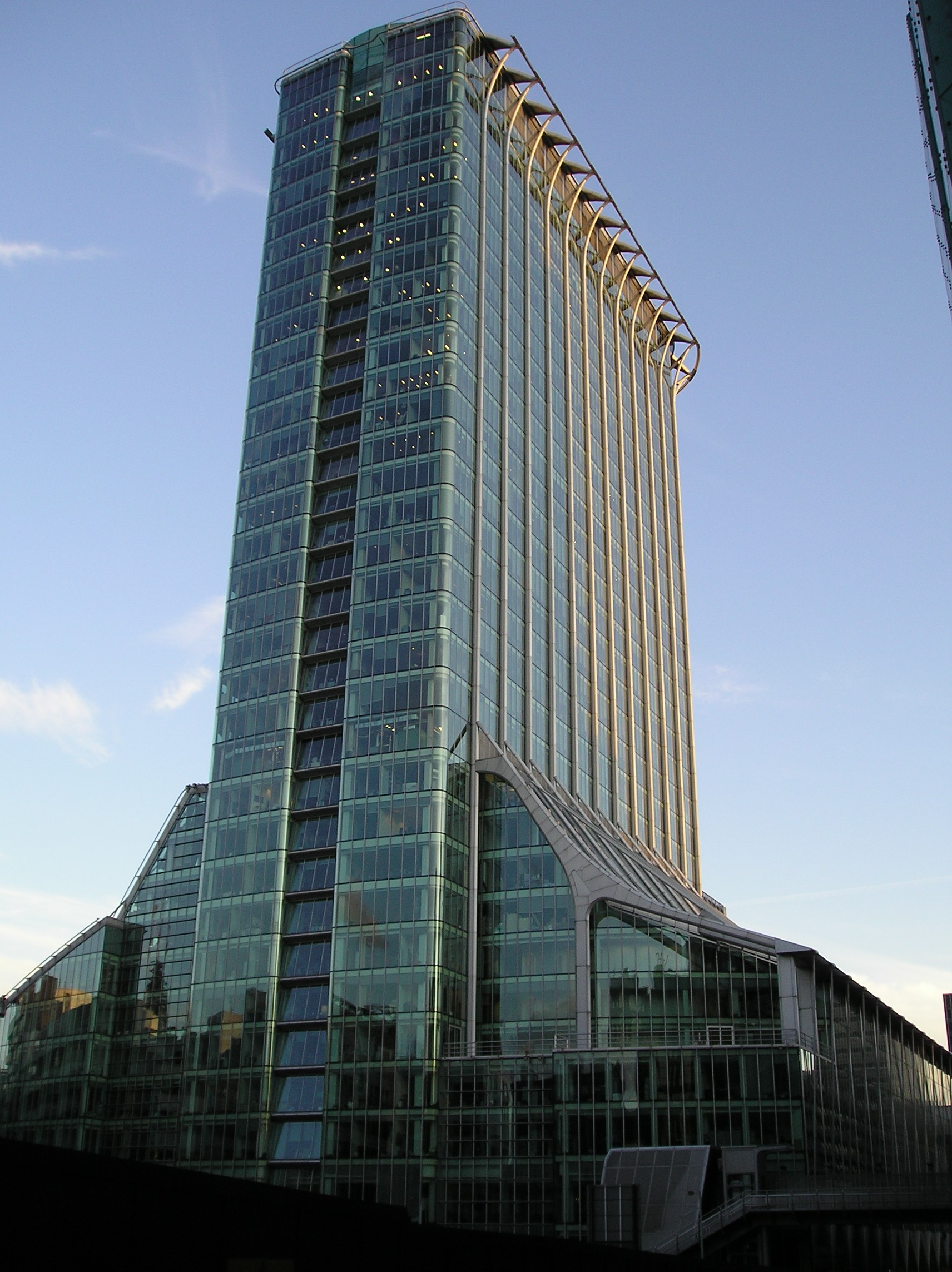
CityPoint,
London

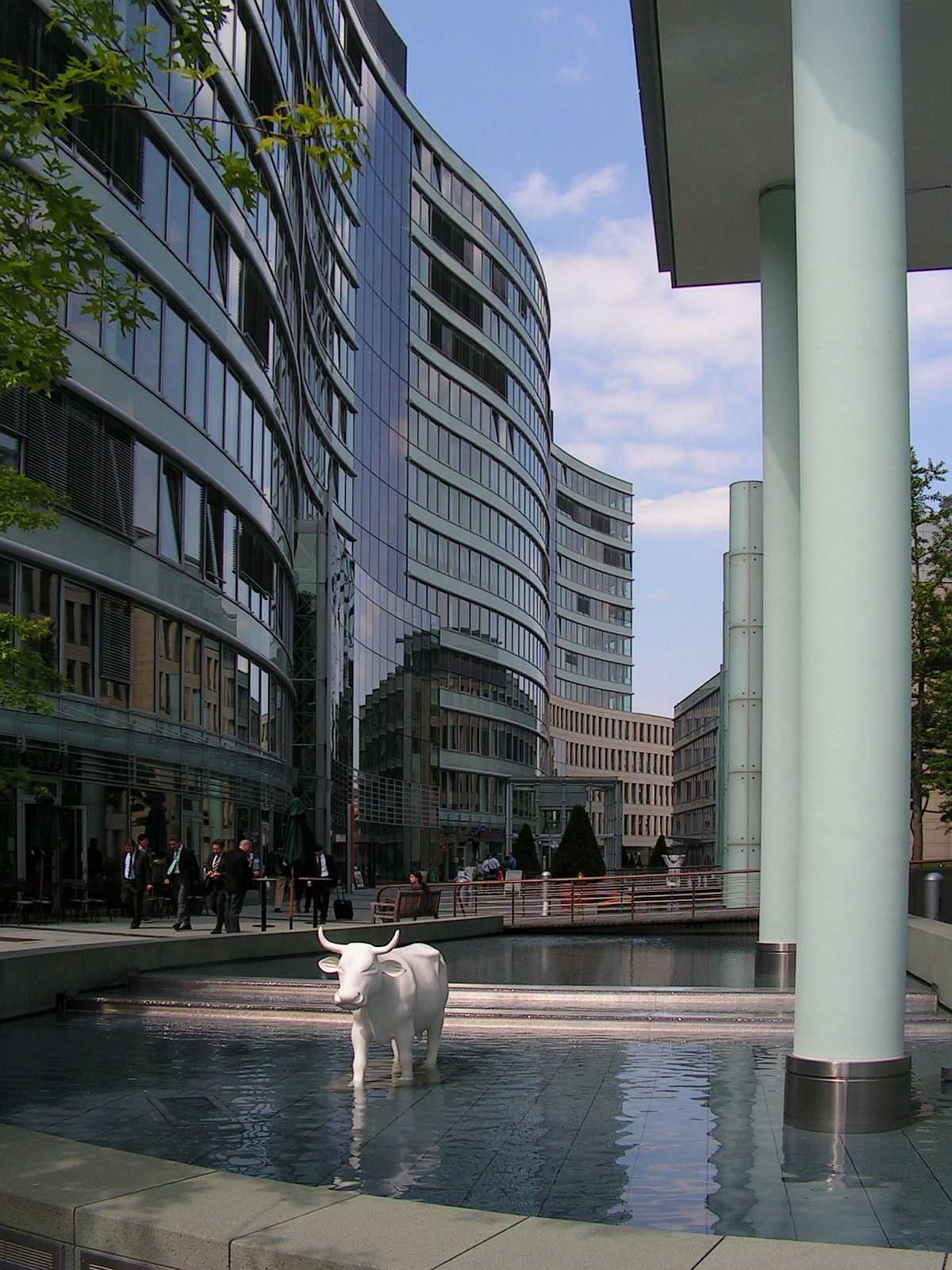
An der Welle,
Frankfurt
(Wolfgang Pehlemann)

== See also ==
- List of largest law firms by profits per partner
