= Minto (surname) =

Minto is a surname. Notable people with the surname include:

- Abid Hassan Minto (born 1932), Pakistani lawyer and politician
- Brian Minto (born 1975), American boxer
- Dorothy Minto (1886–1957), British actor
- Francesco Minto (born 1987), Italian rugby player
- Harry Minto (1864–1915), American prison officer killed in the line of duty, son of John Minto the Oregon pioneer
- Jenni Minto (born 1968), Scottish politician
- John Minto (born c. 1953), New Zealand political activist
- John Minto (British politician) (1887 – c. 1963)
- John Minto (Oregon pioneer) (1822–1915)
- Lee Minto (born 1927), American women's health activist
- Les Minto (1886–1955), Australian rules footballer
- Matt Minto (born 1990), Australian rugby league footballer
- Nancy Lee Minto, more commonly known as Nancy Dine (1937–2020), American filmmaker
- Scott Minto (born 1971), English footballer
- Scott Minto (rugby league) (born 1978), Australian rugby league footballer
- Wallace L. Minto (1921–1983), inventor of the Minto wheel
- William Minto (1845–1893), Scottish author

== See also ==
- Minton (surname)
- Minto (disambiguation)
