= David Goodfriend =

- Education: Beloit College; Georgetown University Law Center
- Occupation(s): Attorney, executive, lobbyist

David Goodfriend (born 1968) is an American attorney, political figure, and media commentator. He notably served as deputy White House staff secretary to President Bill Clinton and as a Federal Communications Commission (FCC) advisor. A former telecommunications lawyer Willkie Farr & Gallagher, Goodfriend has remained active in the telecommunications field after leaving government, having joined satellite service company EchoStar in 2001.

== Early life and education ==
Goodfriend graduated summa cum laude from Beloit College in 1990. He received his Juris Doctor degree from the Georgetown University Law Center. After law school, he became a telecoms lawyer at Willkie Farr & Gallagher.

== Career ==
=== Government career ===
Goodfriend served as a staffer to Democratic U.S. Representative Charles B. Rangel and Senator Herb Kohl. He went on to serve as deputy White House staff secretary in the Clinton administration. Goodfriend was a legal advisor to Susan Ness, a member of the Federal Communications Commissioner (FCC).

=== Post-government career ===
After leaving the FCC, he joined satellite service company EchoStar as the corporation's director of legal and business affairs. According to The Washington Post, this position allowed him to push for FCC regulations backed by the company, though he was not required to formally register as a lobbyist.

Goodfriend was co-host of "Left Jab" on Sirius-XM Satellite Radio and has been a political contributor on MSNBC and CNBC. Goodfriend was a co-founder and EVP/General Counsel of Air America Radio, and was Vice President of Law and Public Policy at DISH Network, EchoStar Satellite LLC (DISH Network). Goodfriend is also the founder and chairman of Sports Fans Coalition, which calls itself a coalition of sports activists, fighting to give sports fans greater voice in public policy impacting professional and collegiate sports and has been criticized for its financial ties to the ticket resale industry.

In 2023, Goodfriend represented the Communications Workers of America (CWA) in their lawsuit against hedge fund Standard General's acquisition of media company Tegna Inc. Other clients of Goodfriend as of 2023 include Weather Channel, Entertainment Studio Networks and Dish Network.
