= Native Point =

Peninsula and abandoned village in Nunavut, Canada

- Coordinates: 63°44′N 82°31′W
- Country: Canada
- Territory: Nunavut
- Region: Kivalliq

Native Point (Inuktitut: Tunirmiut or Tuneriut) is a peninsula in the Kivalliq Region, Nunavut, Canada. It is located on Southampton Island's Bell Peninsula at the mouth of Native Bay. It is notable for being the location of an abandoned Sadlermiut settlement, currently an archaeological site.

== Archaeological site ==
The Sadlermiut settlement, situated on the west side of the point, was left empty after the last Sadlermiut perished during the winter of 1902–03, due to an epidemic. Now a notable archeological site, it is referred to as "T1" because of the Inuktitut name, "Tuneriut", for Native Point. T1 is the largest Sadlermiut site on the island.

The material culture of the Sadlermiut was limited to chipped stone tools and various manufactured organic artifacts. Among the artifacts found in the site were human figurines called aarnguaq, which was probably used for a healing ritual. This indicates that the Sadlermiut were shamanistic. In addition, multiple human remains were found on the site. Merbs and Wilson grouped the burials into three time stages: the "village" graves, which were thought to be the oldest, "peripheral" burials located northeast and southeast of the settlement which were ranked as intermediate in age, and a series of "meat-cache" graves, suggested to primarily represent casualties from the 1902-1903 epidemic which decimated the Sadlermiut population.
