= Fisher Strait =

Strait in Nunavut, Canada

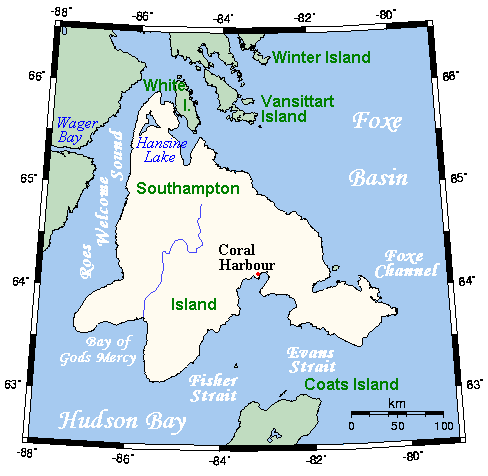
A closeup map of Southampton Island, Hudson Bay, Canada

Fisher Strait (63°N 084°W) is a natural waterway through the central Canadian Arctic Archipelago in the territory of Nunavut. It separates Southampton Island (to the north-west) from Coats Island (to the south-east). To the south-west the strait opens into Hudson Bay.
