= Susan Ness =

American attorney (born 1948)

Commissioner of the Federal Communications Commission
- In office May 19, 1994 – May 30, 2001
- President: Bill Clinton; George W. Bush
- Preceded by: Ervin Duggan
- Succeeded by: Michael Copps

Personal details
- Born: August 11, 1948 (age 76); Elizabeth, New Jersey, U.S.
- Political party: Democratic
- Children: 2
- Education: Rutgers University, New Brunswick (BA); Boston College (JD); University of Pennsylvania (MBA)

Susan Ness (born August 11, 1948) is an American attorney who served as a Commissioner of the Federal Communications Commission from 1994 to 2001.
