= Cape Pembroke (Nunavut) =

Headland in Nunavut, Canada

- Cape
- Coordinates: 62°56′N 81°55′W
- Location: Coats Island, Nunavut, Canada
- Offshore water bodies: Hudson Bay
- Topo map: NTS 45I13 Cairn Cove

Cape Pembroke is an uninhabited headland at the northeastern tip of Coats Island in northern Hudson Bay within the Kivalliq Region of Nunavut, Canada.

== Geography ==
The habitat is characterized by a small, elevated outcrop of Precambrian gneiss and rocky uplands rising to an elevation of 215 m (705 ft) above sea level. It is 3 km^{2} (1.2 sq mi) in size.

== Conservation ==
The cape is a Canadian Important Bird Area (#NU005) and a Key Migratory Bird Habitat Site.

== Fauna ==
Notable bird species include thick-billed murre, black guillemots, peregrine falcon, glaucous gull, and common eider.

Walrus frequent the area.

== History ==
Welsh Royal Navy officer, Sir Thomas Button, in 1612 was the first European to visit the cape.
