= Dickson Minto =

Scottish law firm

Dickson Minto is a Scottish law firm.

According to The Lawyer, Dickson Minto is the 76th-largest firm in the United Kingdom.

Dickson Minto established a formal alliance with New York–based international law firm Willkie Farr & Gallagher which is known for its investment fund, bankruptcy, corporate and securities work. The two firms plan to cooperate on servicing clients under UK and US law, as well as utilizing Willkie's network of European offices.

While Dickson Minto was indubitably affected by the economic downturn, it has nonetheless seen profits in the region of £36 million since 2010 as a result of its private equity client base regaining confidence.

In a survey from 'The Lawyer' online, Dickson Minto was cited as the sixth-biggest firm by turnover in Scotland, and the highest-paying firm in Scotland per revenue per partner.

As of September 2013, Dickson Minto is the highest paying law firm in Scotland, based on profit per equity partner (PEP).

== Origins ==
The firm was founded in 1985 by Alastair Dickson and Bruce Minto, two former partners from rivals, Dundas & Wilson.

== Offices ==
Dickson Minto's head office is in Edinburgh, and it also has a smaller office in London.
