= Mount Minto (Nunavut) =

Mountain in Nunavut, Canada

- Location within Nunavut

Highest point
- Elevation: 213 m (699 ft)
- Listing: Mountains of Nunavut
- Coordinates: 63°56′N 80°57′W

Geography
- Location: Bell Peninsula, Southampton Island, Nunavut, Canada
- Topo map: NTC 45P15 Gorden Bay

Mount Minto (previously, Conical Hill) is a mountain located on northern Bell Peninsula, Southampton Island, in Kivalliq Region, Nunavut, Canada. From eastward, it has a conical shape.

It is named after Gilbert Elliot-Murray-Kynynmound, 2nd Earl of Minto, first Lord of the Admiralty.
