= Bay of Gods Mercy =

Bay in Nunavut, Canada

- Location within Nunavut
- Location: Hudson Bay
- Coordinates: 63°30′N 086°10′W
- River sources: Boas River
- Ocean/sea sources: Arctic Ocean
- Basin countries: Canada
- Settlements: Uninhabited

Bay of Gods Mercy is a waterway in the Kivalliq Region, Nunavut, Canada. It is located in Hudson Bay off southwestern Southampton Island. The Boas River empties into the bay.
