= Sadlermiut =

Extinct group of Inuit in Nunavut, Canada

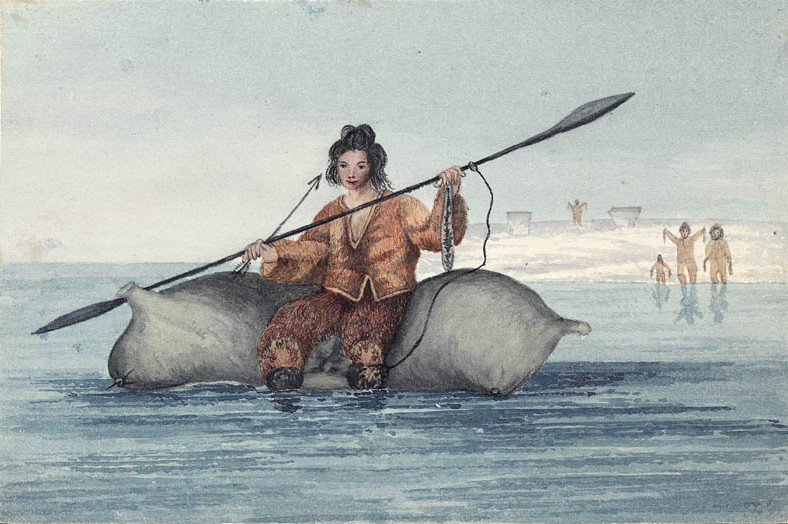
- A Sadlermiut man paddling on an inflated walrus skin, 1830

Regions with significant populations
- Canada

Languages
- Undetermined

Religion
- Possibly shamanism

Related ethnic groups
- Dorset culture, other Inuit, Aleuts, Yupiks

The Sadlermiut (also called Sagdlirmiut, or Sallirmiut in modern Inuktitut spelling, from Sadlerk now Salliq, the Inuktitut name for the settlement of Coral Harbour, Nunavut) were an Inuit group living in near isolation mainly on and around Coats Island, Walrus Island, and Southampton Island in Hudson Bay. They survived into the early 20th century and were thought by some scholars to have been the last remnants of the Dorset culture as they had preserved a culture and dialect distinct from the mainland Inuit. Despite their culture and local traditions seeming to show combined elements of both the Dorset and Thule societies, genetic studies show no Dorset admixture and prove a sole Inuit ancestry, leading many to conclude the cultural difference may be entirely due to their isolation from the mainland Inuit. Research published in 2015 found that the Sadlermiut were genetically Thule who had somehow acquired Dorset cultural features, such as stone technology. It remains a mystery how they acquired Dorset technology in the absence of obvious genetic admixture such as through intermarrying.

Map of territory historically inhabited by the Sadlermiut and major archeological sites associated with Sadlermiut habitation

== History ==
In 1824, HMS Griper, under Captain George Francis Lyon, anchored off Cape Pembroke on Coats Island in Hudson Bay. The whalers then encountered a band of Inuit who were said to have spoken a "strange dialect" and were called Sadlermiut.

The Sadlermiut continued to establish contact with Westerners. However, as with many Indigenous North American groups, the Sadlermiut were often susceptible to Western diseases. By 1896, there were only 70 of them remaining. Then, in the fall of 1902, a British trading/whaling vessel named the Active had made a stop at Cape Low, Southampton Island. It is said that some of the Sadlermiut caught a disease, possibly an influenza, typhoid, or typhus, from a sick sailor aboard the Active, which then spread to the entire community. By the winter 1902–03, the entire Sadlermiut population except for a woman and four children had died.

In 1954 and 1955, Henry B. Collins of the Smithsonian Institution studied Inuit house ruins in the Canadian Arctic. He determined that the ruins found at Native Point were characteristic of Sadlermiut culture which had once been quite extensive. He also found evidence that the Sadlermiut were the last remnants of the Dorset culture.

== Origins ==
The Sadlermiut are most often cited for having maintained a unique culture and dialect apart from other Inuit, similar to the Unangam (Aleut), which is principally the result of an adaptation to environmental and historical constraints, whereas they show a closer genetic profile to paleo-Eskimo groups than neo-Eskimo groups. Because of this, various theories have been established to try to explain the Sadlermiut's cultural differences. One of these has tried to establish a clear link between the Sadlermiut as direct descendants of the Dorset culture. Another theory explains that rather than being related to the Dorset, the Sadlermiut were in fact descendants of the Thule, whose geographically isolated culture would have developed idiosyncratically from the mainland Thule culture. A third theory indicates that the Sadlermiut did not necessarily belong to either group, but because of intermarriage, their roots may have in fact been part of both Dorset and Thule cultures.

In the 21st century, human mitochondrial DNA (mtDNA) research on skeletal remains has seemed to show a genetic relationship between the Sadlermiut and various other related ethnic groups. An incorrect association led many to conclude the Sadlermiut were of Dorset and Thule ancestry due to apparent haplogroups A (46%) and D (54%) found in skeletal remains, attributed to the Thule (A 100%) and Dorset (D 100%) cultures respectively. This evidence, along with statistical differences, led to the errant belief that the Sadlermiut would have been remnants of the Dorset culture, with more recent gene flow from the Thule, providing further evidence for a cultural displacement between the two groups approximately one thousand years ago. Similarly, the same percentage of the presence of both haplogroup A and D was discovered among paleo-Aleut skeletal remains, while it also discovered A 27% and D 73% among the "Neo-Aleut" population. This inconsistency may be attributed to the fact that a population displacement did not occur within the Aleutian Islands between the Dorset and Thule transition, meaning that the Sadlermiut may have not in fact been the very last remnants of the Dorset culture.

Further studies show there is no genetic evidence to show a direct Dorset ancestry, but there is evidence to show both cultures may have shared an earlier common Siberian ancestry.

== Lifestyle ==
The Sadlermiut were a hunter-gatherer people whose subsistence relied primarily on fishing and caribou hunting, although they also hunted seals, polar bears, and walruses. Unlike the mainland Inuit, the Sadlermiut were reported to show very little interest in hunting whales and trapping and were thus of little use to traders who frequented Coral Harbour. In addition, the Sadlermiut often kept a "vigilant distance" between themselves and the traders, the explorers and the Aivilingmiut. This may be in part due to historical confrontations with the Aivilingmiut who sought Southampton Island for its prosperous whaling potential, and the Dene peoples who moved northwards during the summer in pursuit of caribou.

== Language ==
The Sadlermiut language is unknown, but appears to have been significantly different from that of their mainland neighbours. The neighbouring Inuit reported that they used "baby talk", but it is not clear if this means they spoke a distinct variety of Inuit language, or that they used pidgin Inuktitut as a contact language.

== Extinction ==
By the second half of 19th century, the Sadlermiut population numbered above 200. But then the contact with outsiders increased and various diseases caused a steep decline in population. The ethnic group was wiped out in 1902–03, as a result of an epidemic that spread among the community from the whaling ship Active. Out of the total population of 58, there were only 5 survivors (one adult woman and 4 children). The survivors were then evacuated to Naujaat. Out of this group of survivors, only two children were alive by 1908, and they had no memory of Sadlermiut traditions.

== Genetics ==
A genetic study published in Science in August 2014 examined the remains of 10 Sadlermiut buried between c. 1500 AD and 1900 AD. The 8 samples of mtDNA extracted were determined to belong to haplogroup A2b (7 samples) and D3a2a. The haplogroups are characteristic of the Thule people and Inuit, suggesting that the Sadlermiut were derived from the Thule people. It was found that the Thule people were further derived from the Birnirk culture of Siberia, from where they had migrated into North America and completely replaced the Dorset people around 1300 AD.
