= K'iyán Mountain =

Mountain in British Columbia, Canada

- Mount Minto
- Location within British Columbia
- Interactive map of K'iyán Mountain

Highest point
- Elevation: 2,107 m (6,913 ft)
- Prominence: 1,392 m (4,567 ft)
- Listing: Mountains of British Columbia
- Coordinates: 59°56′26″N 133°54′02″W

Geography
- Country: Canada
- Province: British Columbia
- District: Cassiar Land District
- Parent range: Tagish Highland
- Topo map: NTC 104N13 K'iyán Mountain

K'iyán Mountain (pronounced KEY-yawn) is a mountain in the Atlin Country of far northwestern British Columbia, Canada. It is located 43 km (27 mi) north of the town of Atlin. It lies on the western side of the northeast arm of Atlin Lake.

The mountain was formerly known as Mount Minto, named for Gilbert Elliot-Murray-Kynynmound, 4th Earl of Minto, Governor General of Canada 1898–1904. Also named for Lord Minto was Minto City, British Columbia and the associated Minto Mine in the Bridge River Country, and a short street in Vancouver near Main & 2nd. The name was officially changed to K'iyán Mountain on 22 March 2023 as requested by the Taku River Tlingit First Nation. K’iyán is the traditional and ancestral Tlingit name.
