= Coats Island =

Island in Nunavut, Canada

Native name: ᐊᑉᐸᑑᕐᔪᐊᖅ Appatuurjuaq
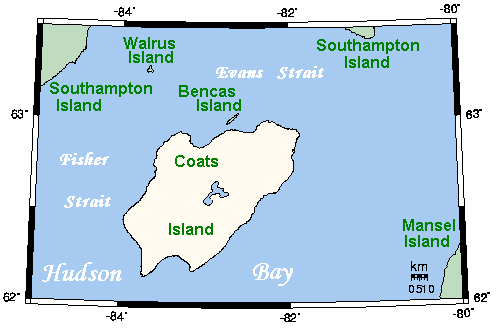

- Location within Nunavut Location within Canada

Geography
- Location: Hudson Bay
- Coordinates: 62°30′N 083°00′W
- Area: 5,708.64 km^{2} (2,204.12 sq mi) (2026)
- Area rank: 24th in Canada & 106th worldwide
- Highest point: 185 m (607 ft)

Administration
- Canada
- Nunavut: Nunavut
- Region: Kivalliq

Demographics
- Population: Uninhabited

Coats Island (Inuktitut: ᐊᑉᐸᑑᕐᔪᐊᖅ, romanized: Appatuurjuaq) lies at the northern end of Hudson Bay in the Kivalliq Region of Nunavut. At 5,708.64 km^{2} (2,204.12 sq mi) in size, it is the 106th largest island in the world, and Canada's 24th largest island. The island has areas of federal crown land and areas of private land owned by Inuit, however, the last permanent residents left in the 1970s. With no permanent settlements, the island is also the largest uninhabited island in the northern hemisphere fully south of the Arctic Circle. It was the last home of the Sadlermiut people who are widely believed to represent the Dorset culture.

== Geography ==
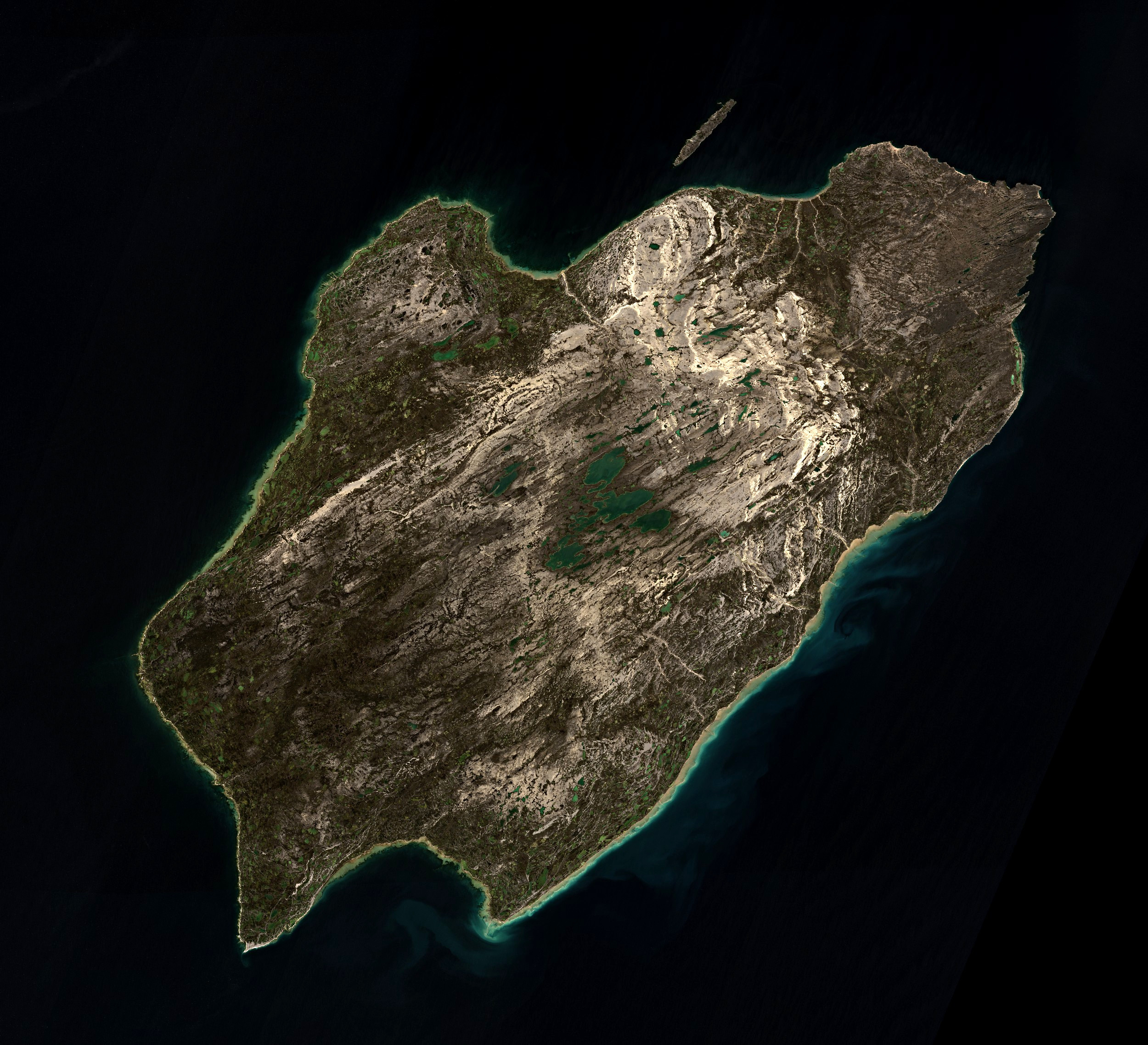
Satellite image of Coats Island, 2019

Coats Island is 130 km (81 mi) long. It reaches a maximum elevation of 185 m (607 ft) above sea level. This high point occurs along the rocky northern perimeter between Cape Pembroke and Cape Prefontaine. The underlying rocks in this area are Precambrian metamorphics. Less than 5 per cent of the island is more than 100 m (330 ft) above sea level. The southern half of the island is primarily low-lying muskeg and made up of Paleozoic sedimentary rocks, such as limestone and sandstone.

== Fauna ==
Since 1920, Coats Island has been designated a caribou reserve. After caribou were extirpated from nearby Southampton Island, the Coats herd was used to re-establish the Southampton herd. It is also known for its population of thick-billed murre. Two colonies of 30,000 birds occur along the cliffs at the rocky northern end. There are also significant concentrations of walrus at walrus haulouts at the base of cliffs or on offshore islands at the northern end of the island (one each at Cape Pembroke and Cape Prefontaine). These are visited regularly by Inuit from the hamlet at Coral Harbour, on Southampton Island, for harvesting. Cape Pembroke is an Important Bird Area.

== History ==
The first recorded sighting of Coats Island by Europeans was in 1612 by Thomas Button; he explored it further the following year. It received its name from William Coats, a sea captain for the Hudson's Bay Company. He visited the area periodically between 1727 and 1751.

In 1824, HMS Griper, under Captain George Francis Lyon, anchored off Cape Pembroke on Coats Island. The whalers then discovered a band of "Eskimos" who were said to have spoken a "strange dialect" and were called Sadlermiut. Since then, the Sadlermiut continued to establish contact with Westerners. However, as with many North American Indigenous peoples, the Sadlermiut were often susceptible to Western diseases.

The area was confirmed to be an island by American whalers, who began visiting the area in the 1860s. By 1896, there were only 70 of Sadlermiut remaining. Then, in the fall of 1902, the British trading and whaling vessel named the Active had made a stop at Cape Low, Southampton Island. It is said that some of the Sadlermiut caught a disease, possibly influenza, typhoid or typhus, from a sick sailor aboard the Active, which then spread to the entire community. By winter 1902–03, the entire Sadlermiut population had died as a result.

A trading post operated by the Hudson's Bay Company was opened on the island in September 1918, supplied from Lake Harbour and Wolstenholme. A number of Inuit families lived on the island during that period, some of whom had been brought from Baffin Island on boats.

In 1921, an overturned fisherman's dory covering two skeletons was found by Captain George Cleveland on Coats Island which were alleged to be the remains of Captain Arthur Gibbons and one of his officers, survivors of the wreck of the American whaling schooner A. T. Gifford. The Canadian Government held a criminal investigation.

In 1925, the island was over-hunted and the HBC post closed, after which the remaining Inuit were relocated to Southampton Island.
