= Southampton Island =

Island in north Hudson Bay in Nunavut, Canada

Southampton
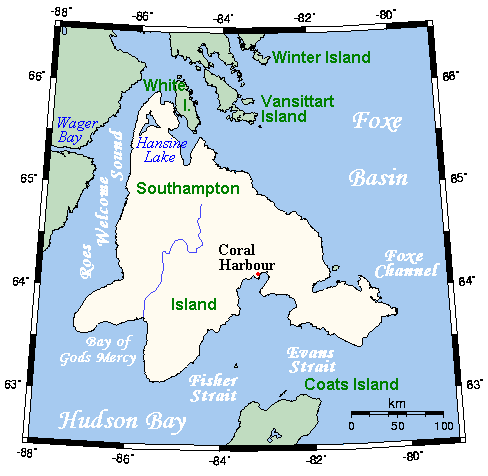
- Map of Southampton Island

- Location within Nunavut Location within Canada

Geography
- Location: Hudson Bay at Foxe Basin
- Coordinates: 64°20′N 084°40′W
- Archipelago: Arctic Archipelago
- Area: 43,069.35 km^{2} (16,629.17 sq mi) (2026)
- Area rank: 7th in Canada & 32nd worldwide
- Highest elevation: 625 m (2051 ft)
- Highest point: Mathiassen Mountain

Administration
- Canada
- Territory: Nunavut
- Region: Kivalliq
- Largest settlement: Coral Harbour (pop. 1035)

Demographics
- Population: 1035 (2021 Canadian census)
- Ethnic groups: Inuit

Southampton Island (Note: Inuktitut: Salliq, or Shugliaq) is a large island at the entrance to Hudson Bay at Foxe Basin. One of the larger members of the Arctic Archipelago, Southampton Island is part of the Kivalliq Region in Nunavut, Canada. The area of the island was listed as 41,214 km^{2} (15,913 sq mi) by Statistics Canada but is now recognised as being 43,069.35 km^{2} (16,629.17 sq mi) by the United States Geological Survey, Esri, and the United Nations Environment Programme – World Conservation Monitoring Centre. It is the 32nd largest island in the world and Canada's seventh largest island. The only settlement on Southampton Island is Coral Harbour (population 1,035 in the 2021 Canadian census), called Salliq in Inuktitut. Southampton Island is the only area in Nunavut that does not use daylight saving time.

== History ==
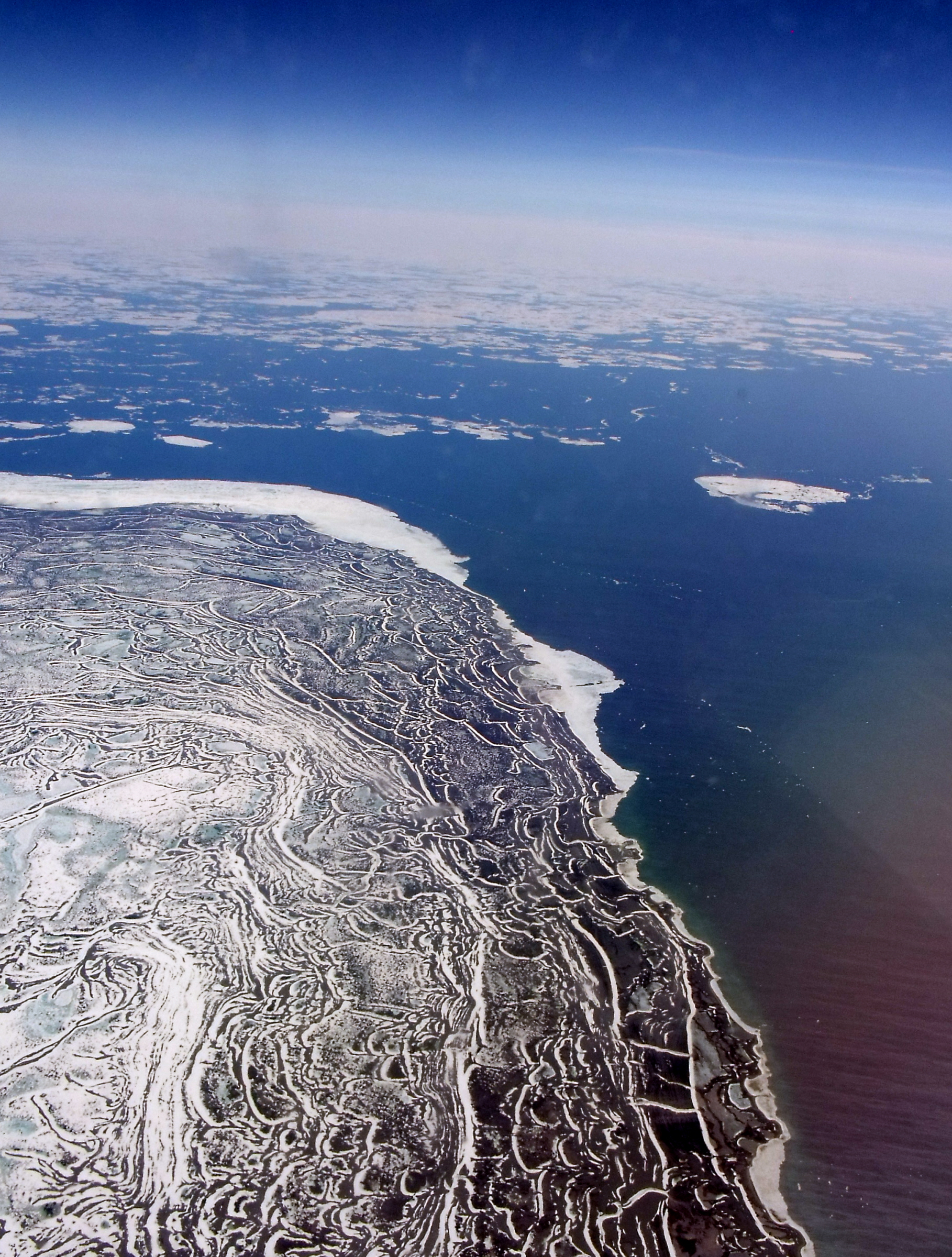
Glacial rebound on Southampton Island. Snow-enhanced paleo-strand lines from the last 10,000 years, during the spring thaw, 2011

Historically speaking, Southampton Island is famous for its now-extinct inhabitants, the Sadlermiut (modern Inuktitut Sallirmiut "Inhabitants of Salliq"). The Tuniit, a pre-Inuit culture, officially went ethnically and culturally extinct in 1902-03 when infectious disease killed all of the Sallirmiut in a matter of weeks. The island's first recorded visit by Europeans was in 1613 by Welsh explorer Thomas Button. At the beginning of the 20th century, the island was repopulated by Aivilingmiut from Naujaat and Chesterfield Inlet, influenced to do so by whaler Captain George Comer and others. Baffin Islanders arrived 25 years later. John Ell, who as a young child travelled with his mother Shoofly on Comer's schooners, eventually became the most famous of Southampton Island's re-settled population. The Native Point archaeological site at the mouth of Native Bay is the largest Sadlermiut site on the island.

== Geology ==
Southampton Island has geological resources that are of scientific and industrial interest. However, full knowledge of the island is still lacking according to the Nunavut government.

The current level of basic geoscience available for the Southampton region is inadequate to meet current exploration demands. Regional scale mapping of the bedrock geology of Southampton Island has not occurred since 1969. Only the most general of rock distinctions are made on the existing geological map, and only a very rudimentary understanding of the surficial geology exists. Currently there is no publicly available, regional-scale surficial (till) geochemical data which is essential for understanding exploration potential for metals and diamonds.

== Gallery ==
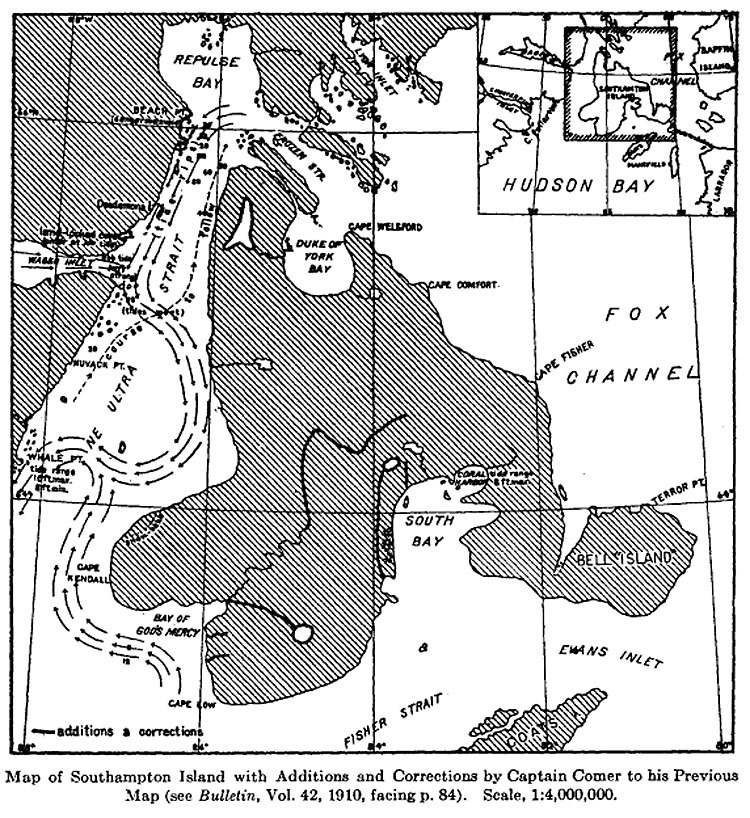
Capt. Capt. George Comer's 1913 map of Southampton.

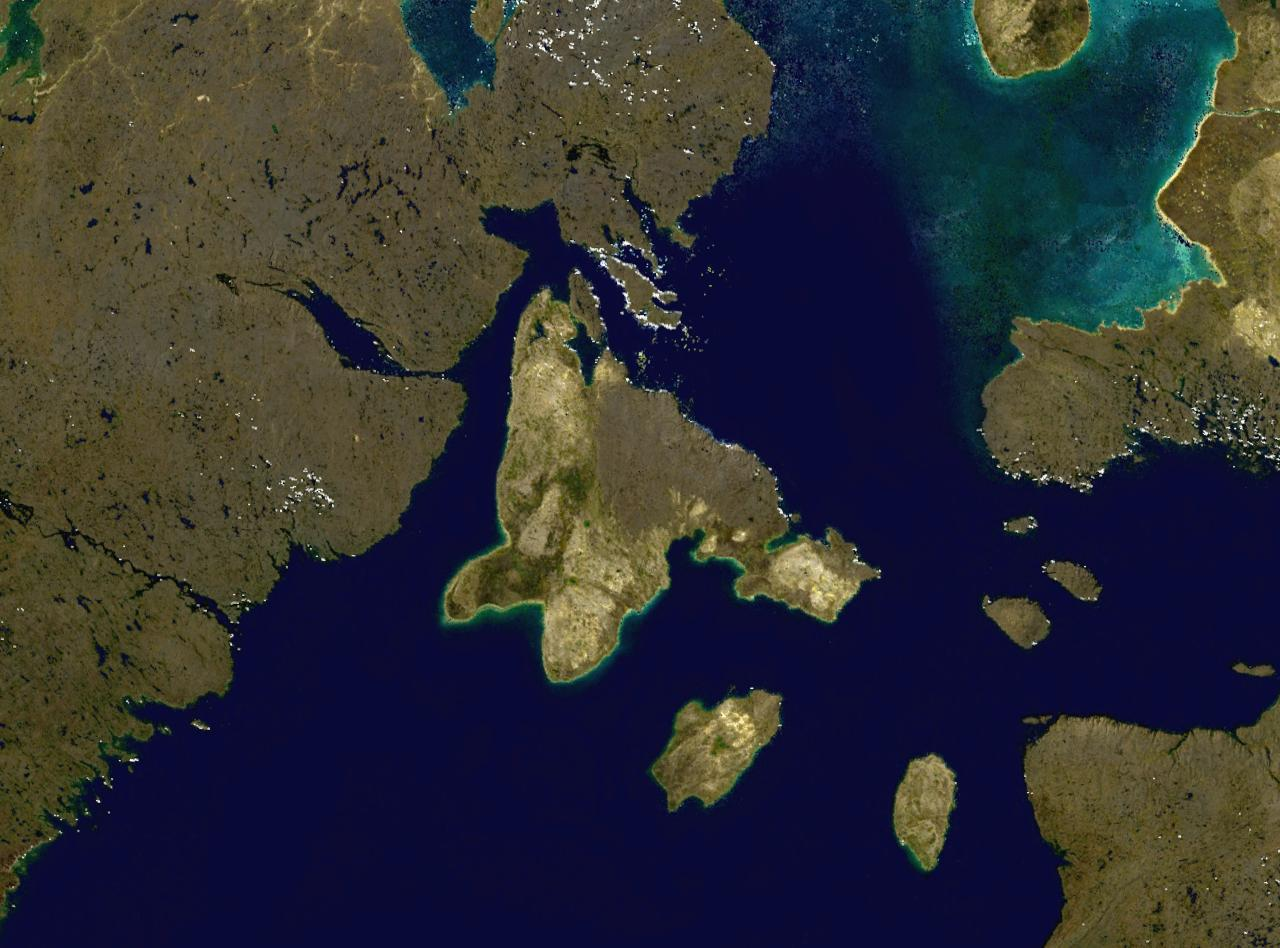
Satellite photo montage of Southampton Island

== Geography ==
It is separated from the Melville Peninsula by Frozen Strait. Other waterways surrounding the island include Roes Welcome Sound to the west, Bay of Gods Mercy in the southwest, Fisher Strait in the south, Evans Strait in the southeast, and Foxe Channel in the east. Hansine Lake is located in the far north. Bell Peninsula is located in the southeastern part of the island. Mathiassen Mountain, a member of the Porsild Mountains, is the island's highest peak. The island's shape is vaguely similar to that of Newfoundland.

=== Climate ===
Southampton Island has a subarctic climate (Köppen Dfc) which transitions into a tundra climate (ET). Like almost all of Nunavut, Southampton Island is entirely above the tree line. Coral Harbour has never gone above freezing in January, February and March (although the latter has recorded 0.0 °C (32.0 °F). Due to the frozen nature of Hudson Bay, there is a severe seasonal lag until June, especially compared to more continental areas such as Fairbanks despite much sunshine and perpetual twilight at night. Due to the drop of solar strength and the absence of warm water even in summer, temperatures still drop off very fast as September approaches. Cold extremes are severe, but in line with many areas even farther south in Canada's interior.

Climate data for Coral Harbour (Coral Harbour Airport) WMO ID: 71915; coordinates 64°11′36″N 83°21′34″W; elevation: 62.2 m (204 ft); 1991–2020 normals, extremes 1933−present
Month	Jan	Feb	Mar	Apr	May	Jun	Jul	Aug	Sep	Oct	Nov	Dec	Year
Record high humidex	0.2	−1.9	−0.5	4.4	8.9	23.1	32.8	30.1	19.9	7.6	3.7	3.2	32.8
Record high °C (°F)	0.6 (33.1)	−1.1 (30.0)	0.0 (32.0)	5.0 (41.0)	9.4 (48.9)	23.5 (74.3)	28.0 (82.4)	26.1 (79.0)	18.5 (65.3)	7.6 (45.7)	4.0 (39.2)	3.4 (38.1)	28.0 (82.4)
Mean daily maximum °C (°F)	−24.9 (−12.8)	−25.6 (−14.1)	−20.2 (−4.4)	−11.0 (12.2)	−2.5 (27.5)	6.9 (44.4)	14.8 (58.6)	12.1 (53.8)	4.8 (40.6)	−2.5 (27.5)	−11.2 (11.8)	−19.2 (−2.6)	−6.5 (20.3)
Daily mean °C (°F)	−29.0 (−20.2)	−29.7 (−21.5)	−24.9 (−12.8)	−16.1 (3.0)	−6.0 (21.2)	3.5 (38.3)	10.2 (50.4)	8.2 (46.8)	2.0 (35.6)	−5.5 (22.1)	−15.5 (4.1)	−23.4 (−10.1)	−10.5 (13.1)
Mean daily minimum °C (°F)	−33.2 (−27.8)	−33.7 (−28.7)	−29.7 (−21.5)	−21.1 (−6.0)	−9.6 (14.7)	0.1 (32.2)	5.6 (42.1)	4.2 (39.6)	−0.8 (30.6)	−8.6 (16.5)	−19.8 (−3.6)	−27.6 (−17.7)	−14.5 (5.9)
Record low °C (°F)	−52.8 (−63.0)	−51.4 (−60.5)	−49.4 (−56.9)	−39.4 (−38.9)	−31.1 (−24.0)	−15.6 (3.9)	−1.1 (30.0)	−3.3 (26.1)	−17.2 (1.0)	−34.4 (−29.9)	−40.6 (−41.1)	−48.9 (−56.0)	−52.8 (−63.0)
Record low wind chill	−69.5	−69.3	−64.3	−55.1	−39.7	−23.2	−8.2	−11.8	−23.7	−43.7	−54.8	−64.2	−69.5
Average precipitation mm (inches)	10.9 (0.43)	—	9.6 (0.38)	18.2 (0.72)	19.9 (0.78)	28.0 (1.10)	34.8 (1.37)	61.7 (2.43)	44.9 (1.77)	36.6 (1.44)	23.3 (0.92)	—	—
Average rainfall mm (inches)	0.0 (0.0)	—	0.0 (0.0)	0.5 (0.02)	5.4 (0.21)	22.6 (0.89)	34.8 (1.37)	61.4 (2.42)	35.6 (1.40)	8.4 (0.33)	0.3 (0.01)	—	—
Average snowfall cm (inches)	—	11.2 (4.4)	—	9.6 (3.8)	18.1 (7.1)	14.8 (5.8)	5.4 (2.1)	0.0 (0.0)	0.0 (0.0)	7.8 (3.1)	28.1 (11.1)	22.9 (9.0)	—
Average precipitation days (≥ 0.2 mm)	9.4	—	8.7	9.7	10.6	10.2	9.8	13.0	12.0	15.4	14.0	—	—
Average rainy days (≥ 0.2 mm)	0.0	—	0.06	0.13	2.2	7.9	9.8	13.0	8.6	4.0	0.55	—	—
Average snowy days (≥ 0.2 cm)	9.2	—	8.7	9.7	9.4	3.4	0.0	0.0	4.1	14.0	13.4	—	—
Average relative humidity (%) (at 1500 LST)	67.4	66.4	69.2	74.5	80.3	73.1	62.8	69.1	75.8	85.5	79.7	72.0	73.0
Mean monthly sunshine hours	37.9	112.1	187.4	240.2	239.9	262.2	312.3	220.4	109.8	70.8	47.9	18.8	1,859.7
Percentage possible sunshine	22.4	47.0	51.6	53.2	42.0	41.9	51.2	43.3	27.9	23.3	24.3	13.9	36.8
Source: Environment and Climate Change Canada (sun 1981–2010)

== Fauna ==
Qaqsauqtuuq Migratory Bird Sanctuary and Ikkattuaq Migratory Bird Sanctuary are located on the island and are important breeding sites for the lesser snow goose (Anser caerulescens caerulescens). The island is also the site of two Important Bird Areas (IBAs), the Boas River wetlands in the southwest and East Bay/Native Bay in the southeast. Both host large summer colonies of the lesser snow goose, together comprising over 10% of the world's snow goose population, with Boas River site alone hosting over 500.000 individuals nesting there. Smaller, but also important, are the colonies of the brent goose (Branta bernicla) and numerous other polar bird species there. Southampton Island is one of two main summering grounds known for bowhead whales in Hudson Bay.
