= Seasonal lag =

Phenomenon whereby maximum average air temperature is delayed by a period of time

Seasonal lag is the phenomenon whereby the date of maximum average air temperature at a geographical location on a planet is delayed until some time after the date of maximum daylight (i.e. the summer solstice). This also applies to the minimum temperature being delayed until some time after the date of minimum insolation. Cultural seasons are often aligned with annual temperature cycles, especially in the agrarian context. Peak agricultural growth often depends on both insolation levels and soil/air temperature. Rainfall patterns are also tied to temperature cycles, given that warmer air is able to hold more water vapor than cold air.

In most Northern Hemisphere regions, the month of February is usually colder than the month of November despite February having significantly later sunsets and more daylight overall. Conversely, the month of August is usually hotter than the month of May despite August having later sunrises, increasingly earlier sunsets, and less daylight overall. The fall equinox (September 21–23) is typically much warmer than the spring equinox (March 19–21), despite the two receiving identical amounts of sunlight. In all cases, the change in average air temperature lags behind the more consistent change in daylight patterns – delaying the perceived start of the next season for a month or so.

An analogous temperature lag phenomenon occurs in diurnal temperature variation, where maximum daily temperature occurs several hours after noon (maximum insolation), and minimum temperature usually occurs just before dawn – well past midnight. Both effects are manifestations of the general physical phenomenon of thermal inertia.

== On Earth ==
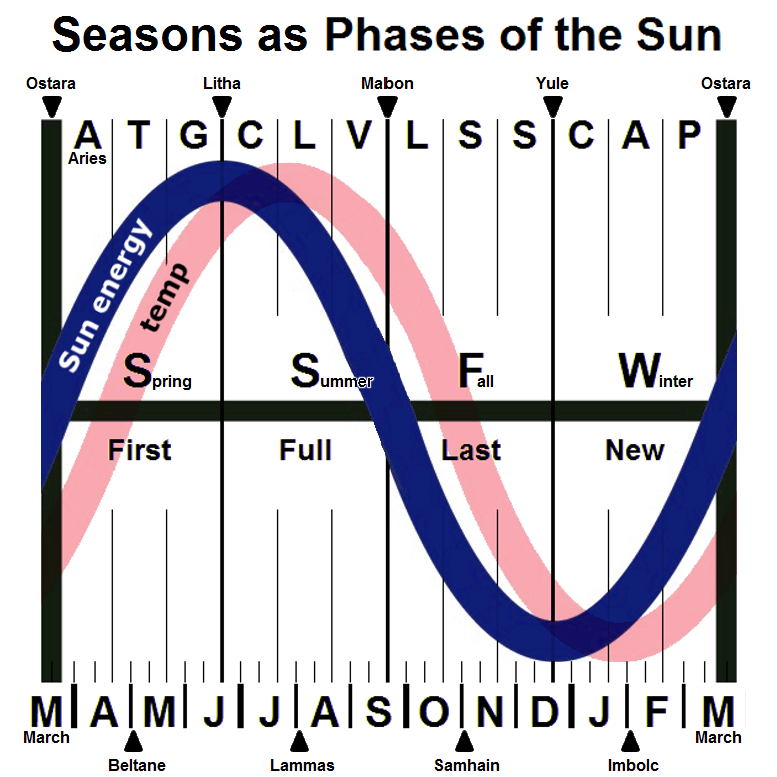
The amount of Sun energy reaching a location on Earth ("insolation", shown in blue) varies through the seasons. As it takes time for the seas and lands to heat or cool, the surface temperatures will lag the primary cycle by roughly a month, although this will vary from location to location, and the lag is not necessarily symmetric between summer and winter. The diagram uses neopagan labeling; Litha is the summer solstice, Yule is the winter solstice, Ostara is the vernal equinox, and Mabon is the autumnal equinox.

Earth's seasonal lag is largely caused by the presence of large amounts of water, which has a high latent heat of freezing and of condensation.

The length of seasonal lag varies between different climates. Extremes range from as little as 15–20 days for polar regions in summer, as well as continental interiors, for example Fairbanks, Alaska, where annual average warmest temperatures occur in early July, and August is notably cooler than June, to 2–3 months in oceanic locales, whether in low latitudes, as in Miami, Florida or higher latitudes as in the Kuril Islands (where at Simushir annual average temperatures peak in late August), and at Cape Sable Island in Nova Scotia, Canada, where (by a slight margin) September is actually the year's warmest month on average. In mid-latitude continental climates, it is approximately 20–25 days in winter and 25–35 days in summer. August as the narrowly warmest month can even happen in ultra-maritime areas north of the Arctic Circle, such as Røst or offshore islands like Jan Mayen and Bear Island in Norway. The latter is at 74°N and such high-latitude summer lag is enabled by Gulf Stream moderation tempering seasonal swings to extend the season.

In many locations, seasonal lag is not "seasonally symmetric"; that is, the period between the winter solstice and thermal midwinter (coldest time) is not the same as between the summer solstice and thermal midsummer (hottest time). San Francisco, for example, has an exceptionally long seasonal lag in the summer, with average daily temperatures peaking in September, and October as its second-warmest month, but very little seasonal lag in the winter, with the lowest temperatures in December and January, around and soon after the winter solstice. This is caused by the water in the Bay Area surrounding the city on three sides. Many areas along North America's west coast have very small winter lag and are characterized by a much more gradual spring warming and relatively more rapid autumn cooling. In much of East Asia with oceanic influences, including Korea and virtually all of Japan, January is the coldest month, but August is the warmest month. In low and mid latitudes, the summer lag is longer, while in polar areas the winter lag is longer (coreless winter in interior Antarctica and Greenland).

Due to seasonal lag, in the Northern Hemisphere the autumnal equinox (around September 22) is considerably warmer than the vernal equinox (around March 20) in most regions despite the fact that both days have almost equal amounts of daylight and darkness. However, even with seasonal lag, the autumnal equinox is cooler than the summer solstice (around June 21) in most regions, as well as the vernal equinox being warmer than the winter solstice (around December 21) even in most oceanic areas. Contrary to popular belief, there is no meteorological reason for designating these dates as the first days of their respective seasons.

In eastern Canada the seasonal lag is consistent both in summer and winter, resulting in February and August being the coldest and warmest months, respectively. In Western Europe the lag is lower in spite of the Atlantic coastline, usually around a month, which is also consistent with many inland areas in the North American Midwest. In Japan, Korea and nearby areas (for example, Vladivostok, Russia), seasonal lag is stronger in summer than winter; the coldest month is January, while the warmest month is August, possibly due to enhanced cloud cover and rain during June into July (for example, the "tsuyu" rainy season in Japan or the "jangma" season in Korea over the same period).

== Other planets ==
Other planets have different seasonal lags. The gas giants Jupiter, Saturn and Uranus, as well as Saturn's moon Titan, all have substantial seasonal lags corresponding to the equivalent of between two and three months in Earth terms.

In the case of Venus no seasonal lag would be detected; the planet undergoes no seasons whatsoever due to the very efficient heat transport of its massive atmosphere. Additionally, its axial tilt is a minor 2.64°; its orbital eccentricity is a negligible 0.006772, making for a very nearly circular orbit.

Mars, on the other hand, has a minor seasonal lag of no more than a few days due to its extremely thin atmosphere. This is also the case for Mercury, even for its "anomalistical seasons", since its even more negligible atmosphere undergoes nearly instantaneous heating and cooling.
