= Coral Harbour Airport =

Airport in Nunavut, Canada

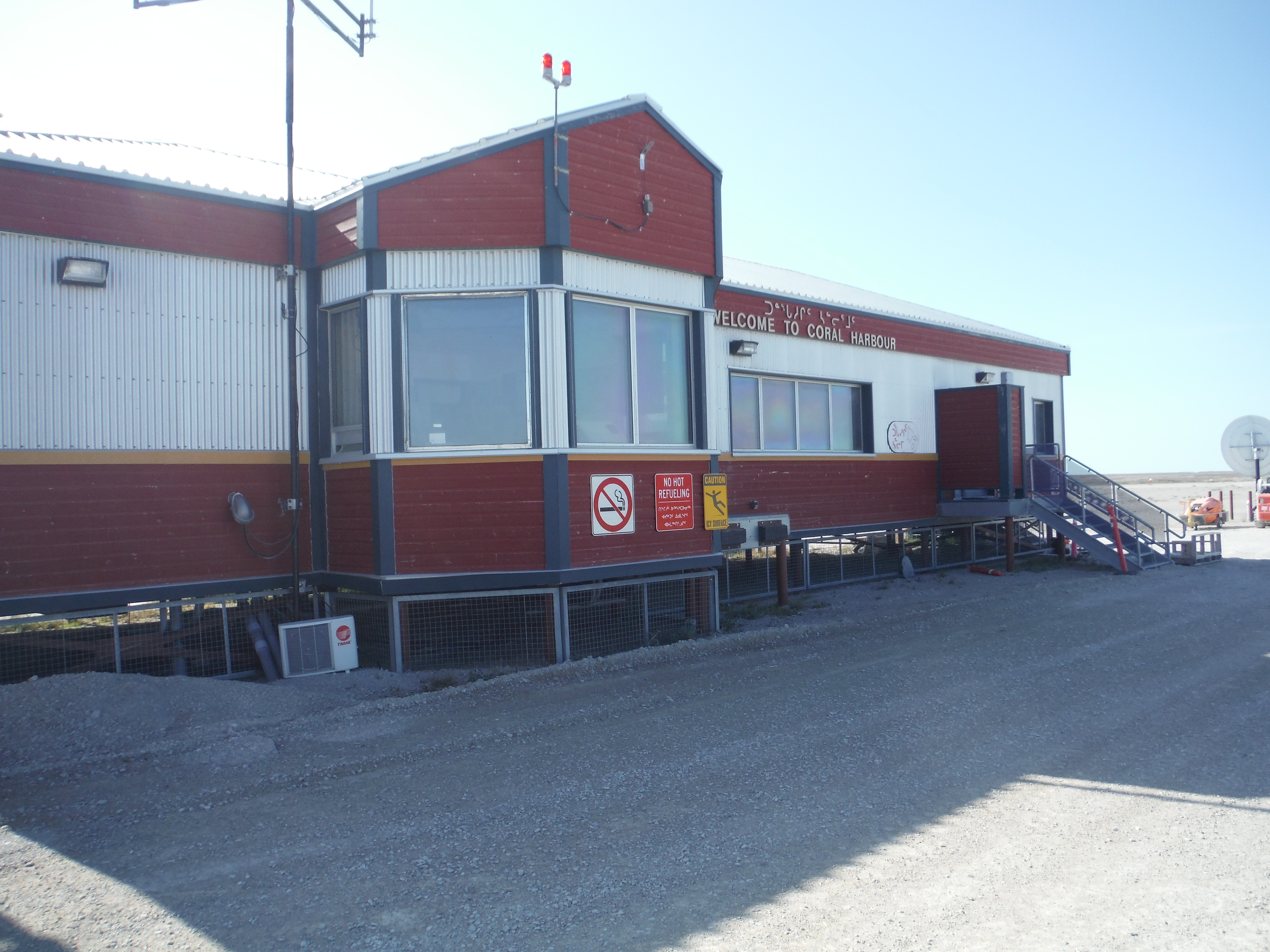
- IATA: YZS; ICAO: CYZS; WMO: 71915

Summary
- Airport type: Public
- Operator: Government of Nunavut
- Location: Coral Harbour, Nunavut
- Time zone: EST (UTC−05:00)
- Elevation AMSL: 204 ft / 62 m
- Coordinates: 64°11′36″N 083°21′34″W

Map
- Location in Nunavut CYZS (Canada)

Runways
| Direction | Length | | Surface |
| Direction | ft | m | Surface |
|---|---|---|---|
| 16/34 | 5,006 | 1,526 | Gravel |

Statistics (2010)
- Aircraft movements: 2,319
- Sources: Canada Flight Supplement; Environment Canada; Movements from Statistics Canada.

Coral Harbour Airport (IATA: YZS, ICAO: CYZS) is located 6 nautical miles (11 km; 6.9 mi) northwest of Coral Harbour, Nunavut, Canada, and is operated by the government of Nunavut. It has a gravel runway that is 5,006 ft × 100 ft (1,526 m × 30 m).

== Airlines and destinations ==
| Airlines | Destinations |
|---|---|
| Calm Air | Rankin Inlet, Naujaat |
