= Frank Smith =

Frank Smith may refer to:

== Academia ==
- Frank Smith (psycholinguist) (1928–2020), American psycholinguist, researcher of educational systems and the nature of learning
- Frank Edward Smith (1876–1970), British physicist
- Frank T. Smith (born 1948), Emeritus Professor of Mathematics at University College London

== Arts and entertainment ==
- Frank Smith (animator) (1911–1975), American animator
- Frank Smith (General Hospital), a fictional character on the American soap opera General Hospital
- Frank Smith (musician) (1927–1974), Australian jazz musician
- Officer Frank Smith, fictional police detective, played by Ben Alexander, in the 1951 TV series Dragnet
- Frank Hill Smith (1842–1904), American artist and interior designer
- Frank Kingston Smith, Jr., American radio personality
- Frank Kingston Smith Sr. (1919–2003), American author and criminal attorney
- Frank Vining Smith (1879–1967), American marine painter
- Frank H. Smith, American media executive and producer

== Business ==
- Francis Marion Smith (1846–1931), borax mining magnate
- Frank L. Smith Bank, a 1905 bank whose building was designed by Frank Lloyd Wright
- Sir Frank Ewart Smith (1897–1995), deputy chairman Imperial Chemical Industries, and chief engineer of armament for Britain during WWIl
- Frank Smith (1880–1967), founder of The Smith's Snackfood Company in 1920

== Government and politics ==
- Frank Smith (Canadian politician) (1822–1901), Canadian senator and businessman
- Frank Smith (Florida settler), Florida state representative and settler
- Frank Smith (D.C. Council) (born 1942), civil rights activist and politician in Washington, D.C.
- Frank Smith (Montana politician) (born 1942), Montana state senator
- Frank Smith (Connecticut politician), member of the Connecticut House of Representatives
- Frank Owens Smith (1859–1924), U.S. representative from Maryland
- Frank L. Smith (1867–1950), U.S. representative from Illinois
- Frank G. Smith (1872–1950), justice of the Arkansas Supreme Court
- Frank Ellis Smith (1918–1997), U.S. representative from Mississippi
- Frank Smith (British politician) (1854–1940), British Christian Socialist politician
- Frank Smith (New South Wales politician) (1852–1910), New South Wales politician
- Frank Smith (South Australian politician) (1888–1948), South Australian politician
- Frank L. Smith (New York politician) (1851–1926), American farmer and politician from New York
- Frank Smith (Kansas politician) (born 1952), member of the Kansas state legislature
- Frank J. Smith (Illinois politician) (1893–?)

== Sports ==
- Brun Smith (Frank Brunton Smith, 1922–1997), New Zealand cricketer
- Frank Smith (cricketer, born 1893) (1893–1975), New Zealand cricketer
- Frank Smith (1900s pitcher) (1879–1952), Major League Baseball (MLB) pitcher
- Frank Smith (1950s pitcher) (1928–2005), MLB pitcher
- Frank Smith (Australian rules footballer) (1905–1968), Australian footballer for Melbourne
- Frank Smith (catcher) (1857–1928), MLB catcher
- Frank Smith (footballer, born 1889) (1889–1982), English footballer
- Frank Smith (footballer, born 1897) (1897–1988), English footballer
- Frank Smith (footballer, born 1936) (1936–2022), English football goalkeeper
- Frank Smith (ice hockey) (1894–1964), Canadian ice hockey administrator
- Frank Smith (rugby union) (1886–1954), Australian rugby union player and Olympic gold medalist
- Frank Smith (sailor), British Olympic sailor
- Frank Smith (umpire) (1872–1943), English cricketer and Test umpire
- Frank M. Smith, American yacht racer
- Frank M. Smith Jr. (1927–1998), American sports broadcasting executive
- Frank Smith Sr., rugby league footballer of the 1930s, and 1940s
- Frank Smith Jr., rugby league footballer of the 1960s
- Frank Smith (Canadian football) (1931–2025), played in the 1950s, coached UBC to five conference titles
- Frank Smith (American football) (born 1981), American football coach

== Other ==
- Frank Elmer Smith (1864–1943), American Medal of Honor recipient
- Frank E. Smith, president of the National Association of Letter Carriers

== See also ==
- Francis Smith (disambiguation)
- Frank Smyth (1891–1972), New Zealand rugby union player
- Frank Smythe (1900–1949), British mountaineer
- Franklin W. Smith (1826–1911), American abolitionist
