= Northwest Passage expedition of 1746 =

1746 UK commissioned expedition in Canada

In 1746 a group of United Kingdom investors, led by Arthur Dobbs, commissioned a private Northwest Passage expedition of 1746.

Dobbs had played a key role convincing the Royal Navy and the Royal Society to send out an expedition in 1741. The selection of Christopher Middleton to command the expedition, and his cousin, William Moor, as second in command, was due to Dobbs' influence.

Middleton reported that the large inlet he had been sent to explore, was not an outlet to the Pacific Ocean, and he named it Wager Bay.

Several of Middleton's subordinates, including Moor, sided with Dobbs who accused Middleton of accepting bribes from his previous employer, the Hudson's Bay Company.

Moor commanded the expedition of 1746. His ship was the Dobbs Galley. Francis Smith commanded the California.

The expedition stayed at York Factory during the winter of 1747. James Isham, the factor (governor) of York Factory, recorded great acrimony between the two captains. Seven crew members succumbed to scurvy.

After the bay was free enough of ice, for exploration, the ships proceeded separately. They confirmed Middleton's conclusion, from the expedition of 1741, that Wager Bay was not a passage to the Pacific Ocean. They also confirmed that two other indentations in the coast, Rankin Inlet, and newly discovered Chesterfield Inlet, were not passages to the Pacific Ocean.

West coast of Hudson's Bay

Wager Bay

Rankin Inlet

Chesterfield Inlet
