= Francis Smith =

Francis Smith may refer to:

== Government and politics ==
- Francis Smith (by 1516-1605), member of parliament (MP) for Truro and Stafford
- Francis Smith, 2nd Viscount Carrington (c. 1621 – 1701), English peer
- Francis Ormand Jonathan Smith (1806–1876), US representative from Maine
- Francis Smith (Australian politician) (1819–1909), premier of Tasmania
- Frank Smith (British politician) (1854–1940), MP for Nuneaton, 1929–1931
- Francis Henry Smith (1868–1936), Reform Party member of parliament in New Zealand
- Francis Smith (Missouri politician) (1905–1984), American politician from Missouri
- Francis R. Smith (1911–1982), U.S. representative from Pennsylvania

== Military ==
- Francis Smith (British Army officer) (1723–1791), British officer during the American Revolutionary War
- Francis Henney Smith (1812–1890), first superintendent of the Virginia Military Institute
- Francis Smith (RAAF officer) (1896–1961), Australian World War I flying ace
- F. Neale Smith (1930–2020), rear admiral in the United States Navy

== Business ==
- Francis Pettit Smith (1808–1874), British inventor of the screw propeller
- Francis Shubael Smith (1819–1887), American publisher
- Francis Marion Smith (1846–1931), American borax magnate

== Sports and entertainment ==
- Frank Smith (rugby union) (Francis Bede Smith; 1886–1954), Australian rugby union player
- Fran Smith Jr. (born 1952), bass guitarist for The Hooters
- Francie Larrieu Smith (born 1952), American track and field athlete

== Science and academia ==
- Francis Graham-Smith (1923–2025), British astronomer
- Francis Hopkinson Smith (1838–1915), American author, artist and engineer
- Francis P. Smith (Duquesne University) (1907–1990), American Catholic priest and university president
- Francis Smith of Warwick (1672–1738), English architect
- Francis Smith (explorer), captain of an exploration vessel, during the Northwest Passage expedition of 1746

== Others ==
- Francis Wilford-Smith (1927–2009), British cartoonist, graphic artist, and producer and archivist of blues music
- Francis Smith (priest) (fl. 1917–1959), South African Anglican priest
- Francis Palmer Smith (1886–1971), American architect based in Atlanta, Georgia, also known as Francis P. Smith
- Francis Smith (judge) (1847–1912), Sierra Leonean judge in the Gold Coast
- Francis Jagoe Smith (1873–1969), Postmaster General of Ceylon

== See also ==
- Frank Smith (disambiguation)
- Frances Smith (disambiguation)
