= Frank J. Smith =

Frank J. Smith may refer to:

- Frank Smith (Montana politician) (born 1942)
- Frank J. Smith (Illinois politician) (1893–?)

== See also ==
- Frank Smith (disambiguation)
