= Northwest Passage expedition of 1741 =

The Royal Society and the Royal Navy worked together to commission the Northwest Passage expedition of 1741.

The commander of the expedition, Christopher Middleton, had been a captain of ships of the Hudson's Bay Company, sailing on these ships that made annual voyages to supply the company's outposts, since 1721. He had a scientific mind, and had published observations that earned him election the Royal Society, in 1737. He commanded HMS Furnace, while his cousin and protege, William Moor, also formerly a captain of Hudson's Bay Company ships, commanded HMS Discovery.

Arthur Dobbs, a member of the Irish House of Commons played an influential role in organizing the expedition.

== Orders ==
J.C. Beaglehole, in his Life of Captain James Cook, notes that the expedition was commissioned in 1740, the same year George Anson was directed to lead a squadron into the Pacific Ocean, to attack Spanish shipping. He noted that Middleton's orders suggested he might rendezvous with Anson, off California.

== Voyage ==
Wager Bay

Ice blocks navigation in Hudson's Bay for over half the year. Middleton was able to get the government to put pressure on the Hudson's Bay Company to allow his ships to moor off Fort Prince of Wales, at the mouth of the Churchill River, and to provide room for his crew, during the winter of 1742, so he could begin his expedition as soon as the Bay was free of ice.

His crew were housed in an older wooden fort that had been abandoned, in place of the new stone fort. Ten of his crew died, over the winter, and many others lost fingers and toes to frostbite.

The expedition was able to set off in June 1742. They proceeded north to a deep indentation he eventually named Wager Bay, after Charles Wager, First Lord of the Admiralty.

== Aftermath ==
Dobbs thought that Middleton's reports that he did not find a Northwest Passage were part of a hoax, and the two men conducted a pamphlet campaign, denouncing each other.

== James Cook's third expedition ==
Captain James Cook's third and final expedition sent him back to the Pacific Ocean, to look for a Northwest Passage from the Pacific end. Cook consulted with Middleton, prior to his departure.
