= Frances Smith =

Frances Smith may refer to:

- Frances Smith (golfer) (1924–1978), British golfer
- Frances Smith (missing person) (1909/1910 – disappeared 1928), American college student, body recovered in 1929
- Frances Smith (born 1941), birth name of Frances Strickland, First Lady of the U.S. state of Ohio
- Frances Dean Smith (1922–2009), American poet
- Frances Dora Smith (1832–1922), British noblewoman and great-grandmother of Queen Elizabeth II
- Frances Kirby Smith (1785–1875), mother of Confederate General Edmund Kirby Smith and a Confederate spy
- Frances Hagell Smith (1877–1948), New Zealand missionary teacher
- Frances Sutah Smith (1908–1980), birth name of American photographer Polly Smith (photographer)

== See also ==
- Fanny Smith (born 1992), Swiss skier
- Francis Smith (disambiguation)
