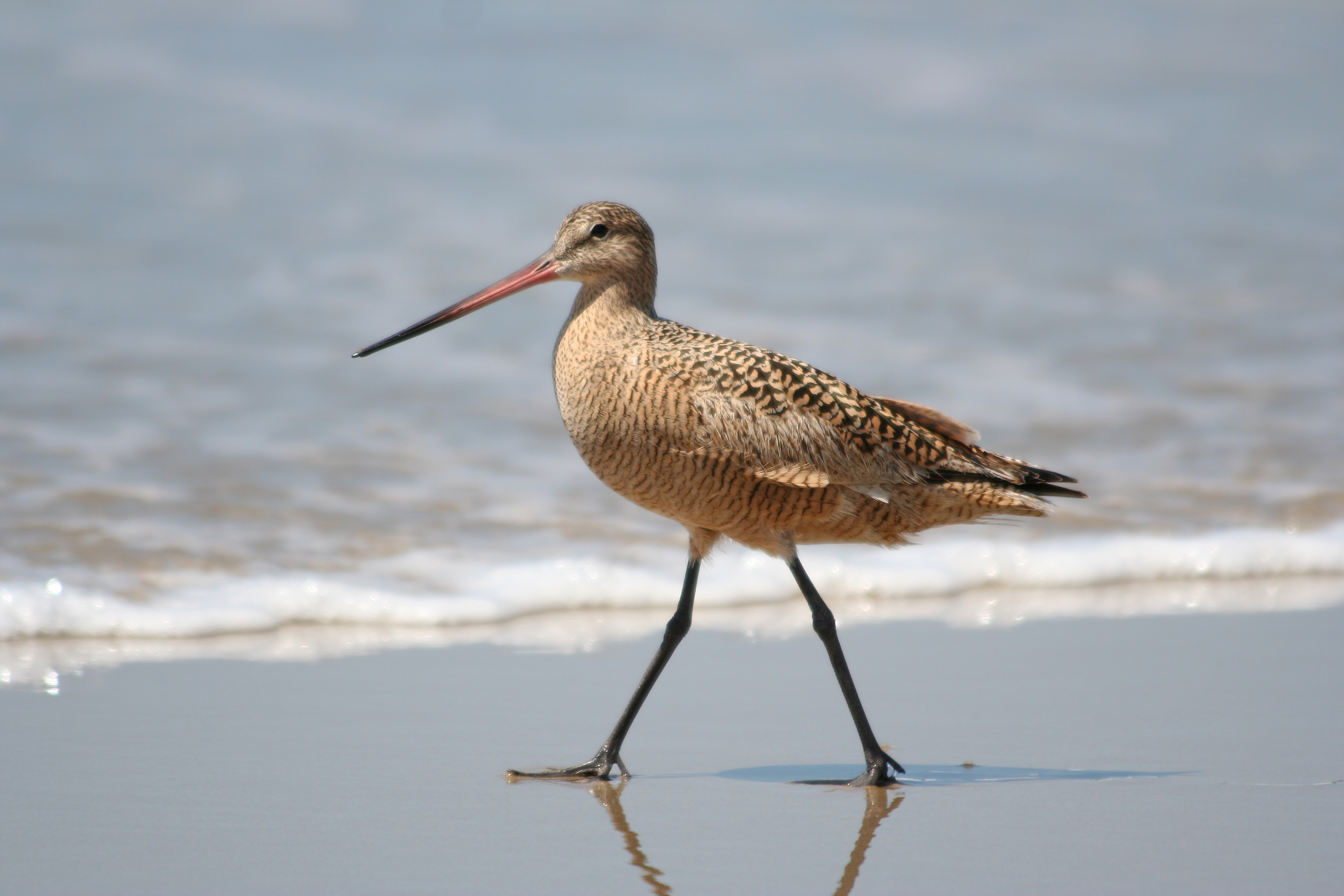

Conservation status
- Vulnerable (IUCN 3.1)

Scientific classification
- Kingdom: Animalia
- Phylum: Chordata
- Class: Aves
- Order: Charadriiformes
- Family: Scolopacidae
- Genus: Limosa
- Species: L. fedoa

Binomial name
- Limosa fedoa (Linnaeus, 1758)
- Range of L. fedoa Breeding Range Non-breeding Range

Synonyms
- Scolopax fedoa Linnaeus, 1758

= Marbled godwit =

Species of bird

The marbled godwit (Limosa fedoa) is a large migratory shorebird in the family Scolopacidae. On average, it is the largest of the four species of godwit.

== Taxonomy ==
In 1750 the English naturalist George Edwards included an illustration and a description of the marbled godwit in the third volume of his A Natural History of Uncommon Birds. He used the English name "The Greater American Godwit". Edwards based his hand-coloured etching on a preserved specimen that had been brought to London from the Hudson Bay area of Canada by James Isham. When in 1758 the Swedish naturalist Carl Linnaeus updated his Systema Naturae for the tenth edition, he placed the marbled godwit with godwits and ibises in the genus Scolopax. Linnaeus included a brief description, coined the binomial name Scolopax fedoa and cited Edwards' work. The marbled godwit is now placed in the genus Limosa that was introduced in 1760 by the French zoologist Mathurin Jacques Brisson. The genus name Limosa is from Latin and means "muddy", from limus, "mud". The specific epithet fedoa may be an Old English name for a godwit. The word was mentioned by the English naturalist William Turner in 1544.

Two subspecies are recognised:

- L. f. beringiae Gibson & Kessel, 1989 – breeds in Alaska and winters in the west United States. Averages shorter legs and bill than nominate subspecies.
- L. f. fedoa (Linnaeus, 1758) – breeds in central, south-central Canada, and the north-central United States, winters in southern United States to northwest South America. A disjunct breeding population breeds in James Bay.

== Description ==
The total length is 40–50 cm (16–20 in), including a large bill of 8–13 cm (3.1–5.1 in), and wingspan is 70–88 cm (28–35 in). Body mass can vary from 240 to 520 g (8.5 to 18.3 oz). The average weight of 40 males was 326 g (11.5 oz) and that of 45 females was 391 g (13.8 oz). Bill length is from 73.9 to 131 mm (2.91 to 5.16 in). Among all the members of the sandpiper family, only the curlews attain sizes that significantly exceed this species.

Adults have long blue-grey legs and a very long pink bill with a slight upward curve and dark at the tip. The long neck, breast and belly are pale brown with dark bars on the breast and flanks. The back is mottled and dark. They show cinnamon wing linings in flight.

== Distribution and habitat ==
Marbled godwits breed in three distinct areas with their own unique route. The vast majority occur in mid-continental North America, followed by eastern Canada and the Alaska Peninsula, USA. In addition, the largest winter ranges are the Atlantic, Pacific and Gulf coasts of the US and Mexico.

Godwits breeding in the western USA and Canada follow a route through the Utah stopover site, with a final arrival in the winter sites of Mexico and the Caribbean. Species breeding in eastern Canada migrate across the US, and stopover at sites along the Gulf of California and Mexico. Furthermore, those breeding in North and South Dakota winter in coastal Georgia. The Bear River Migratory Bird Refuge located at Great Salt Lake in Utah (USA), is one of the most popular stopover sites for godwits in the spring and fall. Satellite tracking data from pairs breeding in Alberta revealed that male and female godwits appear to migrate and winter separately, with females from that population migrating down to the California coast and males stopping over at Great Salt Lake before wintering down in Baja California Sur.

== Behavior and ecology ==
=== Breeding ===
They nest on the ground, usually in short grass.

=== Food and feeding ===
These birds forage by probing on mudflats, in marshes, or at the beach (see picture below). When the tide is out, they eat. In short grass, they may pick up insects by sight. They mainly eat insects and crustaceans, but also eat parts of aquatic plants.

When the tide is in, they roost. They often sleep by standing on one leg and tucking their bill into their body (see picture below).

== Conservation ==
Their numbers were reduced by hunting at the end of the 19th century. Although they have recovered somewhat since that time, their population has declined in recent times as suitable habitat is used for farming.

== Gallery ==
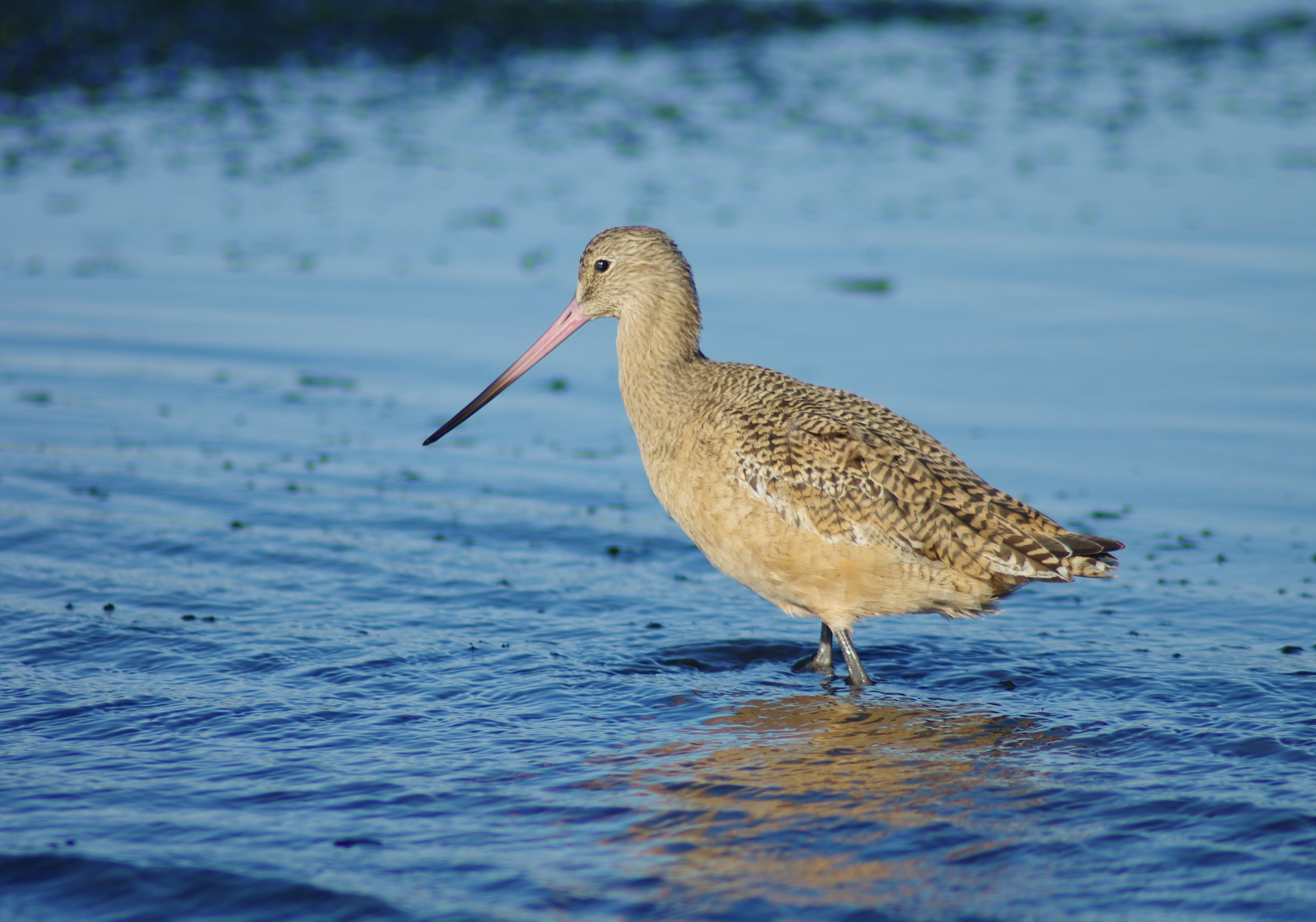
Feeding on mudflat at low tide, Elkhorn Slough

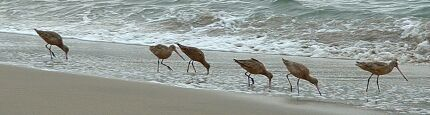
Marbled godwits feeding, Point Reyes National Seashore, California

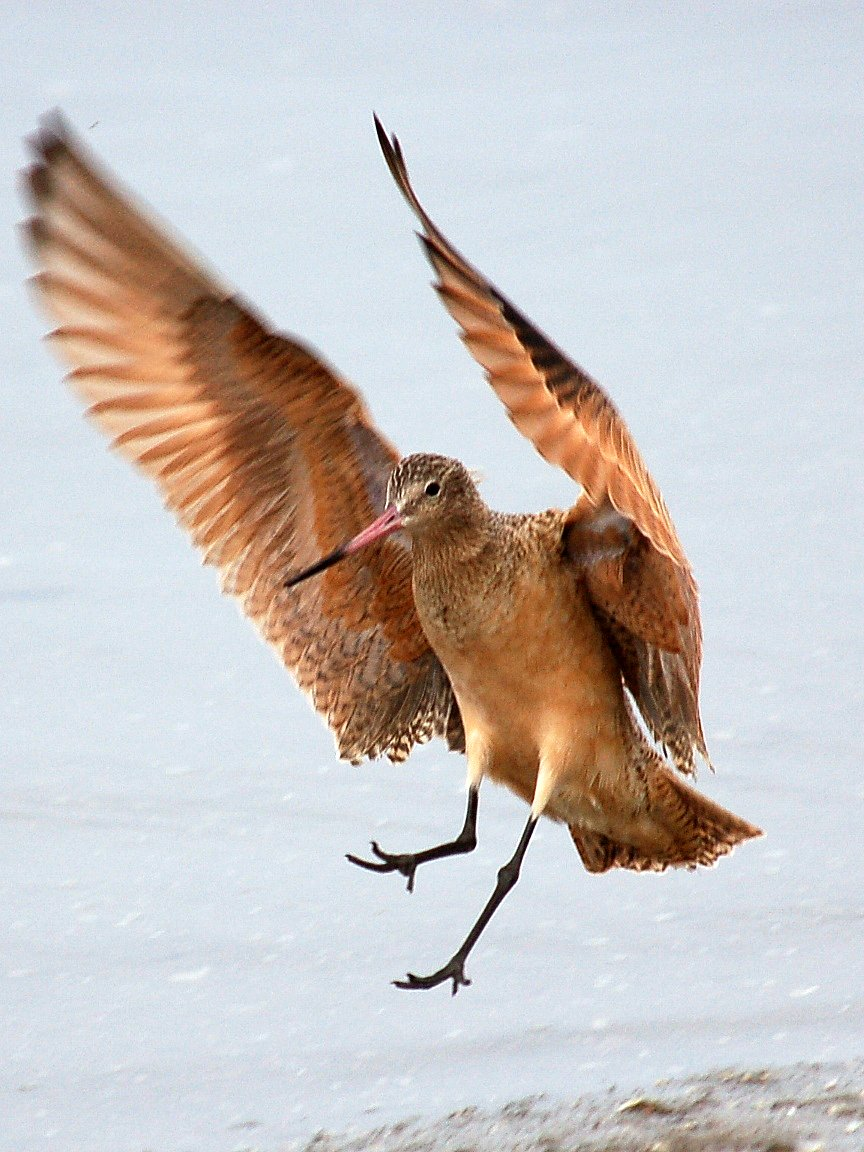
Marbled godwit landing San Diego CA

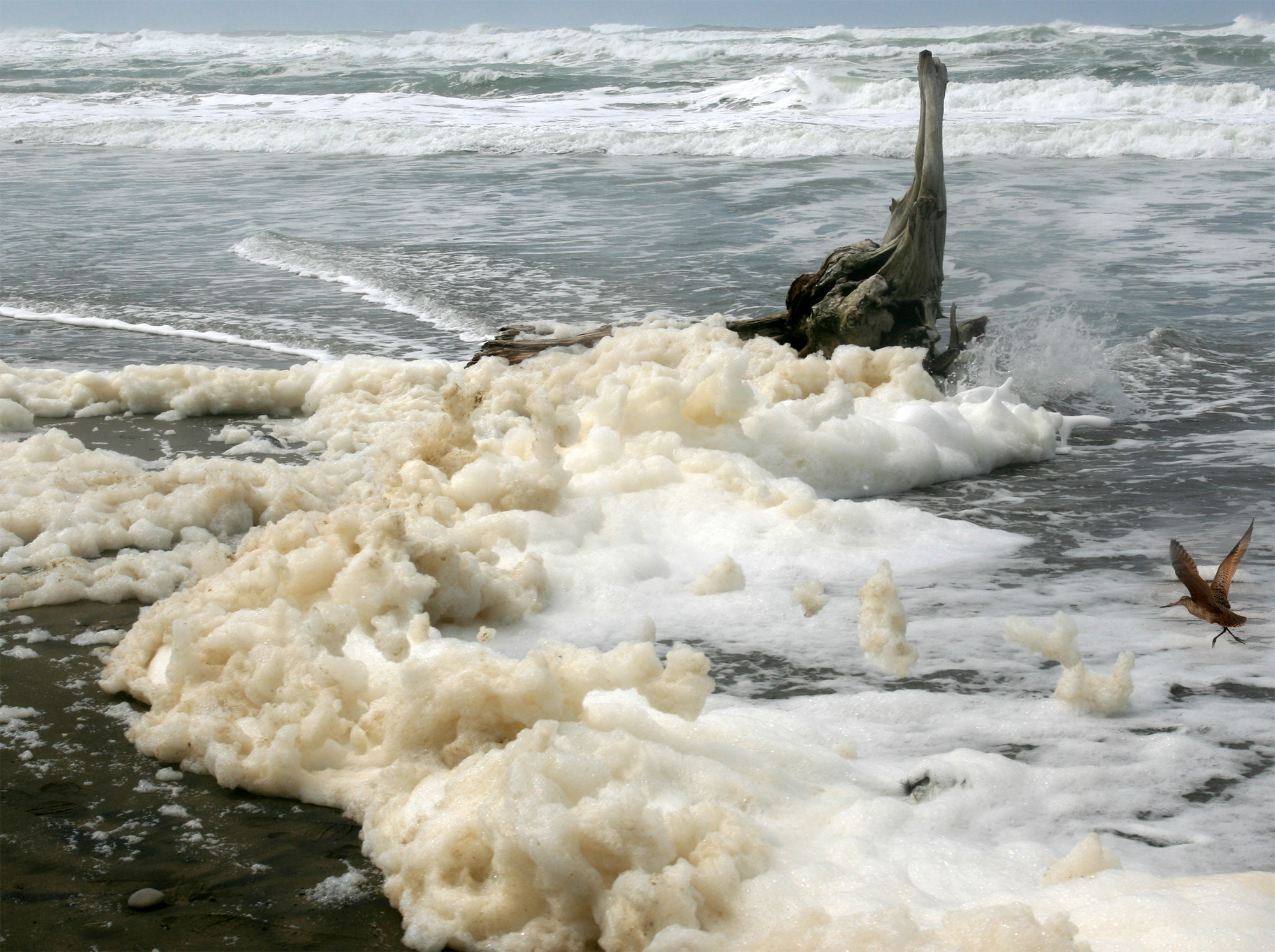
Marbled godwit flying near sea foam at Ocean Beach, San Francisco

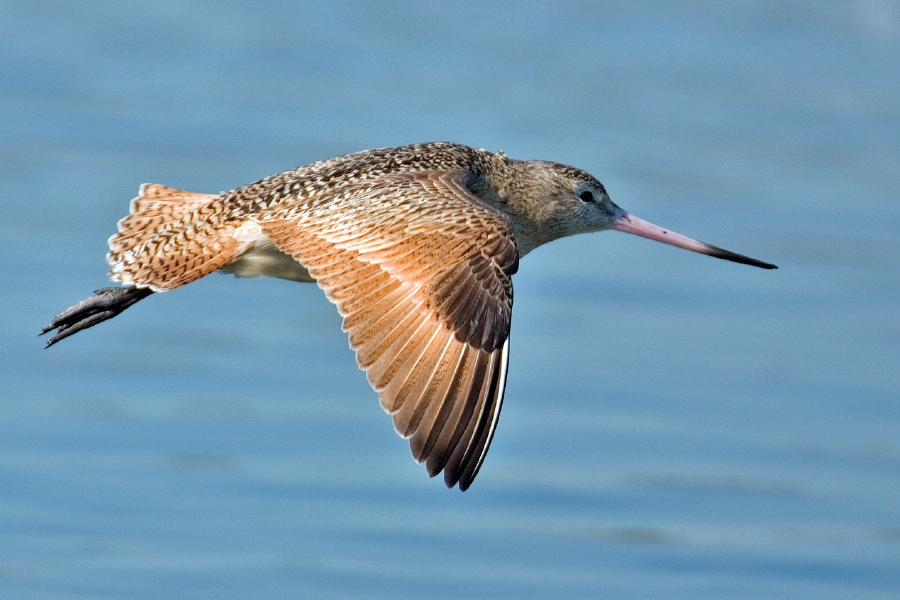
In flight

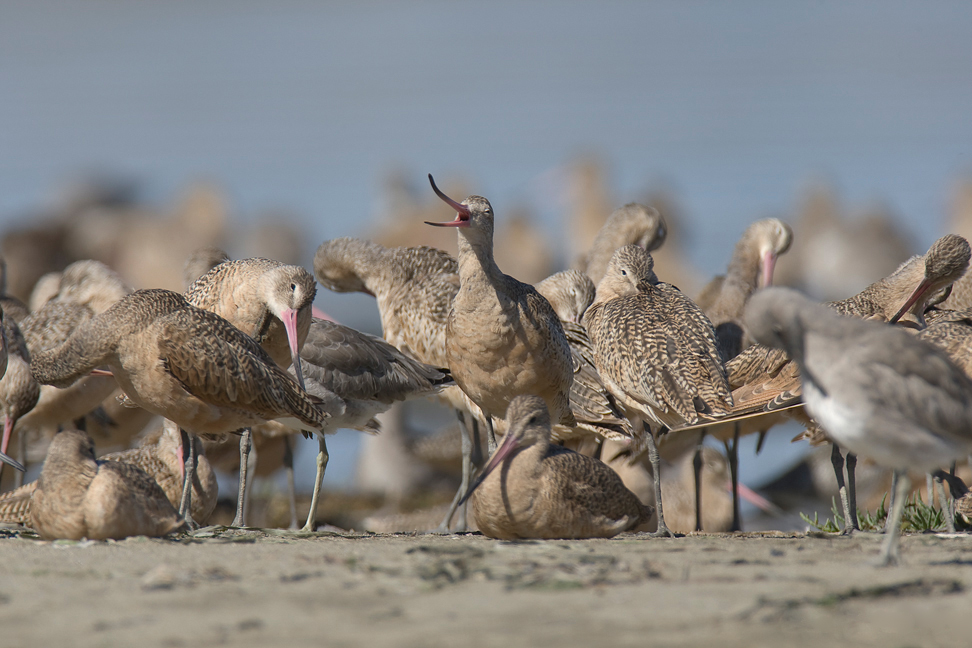
Flock

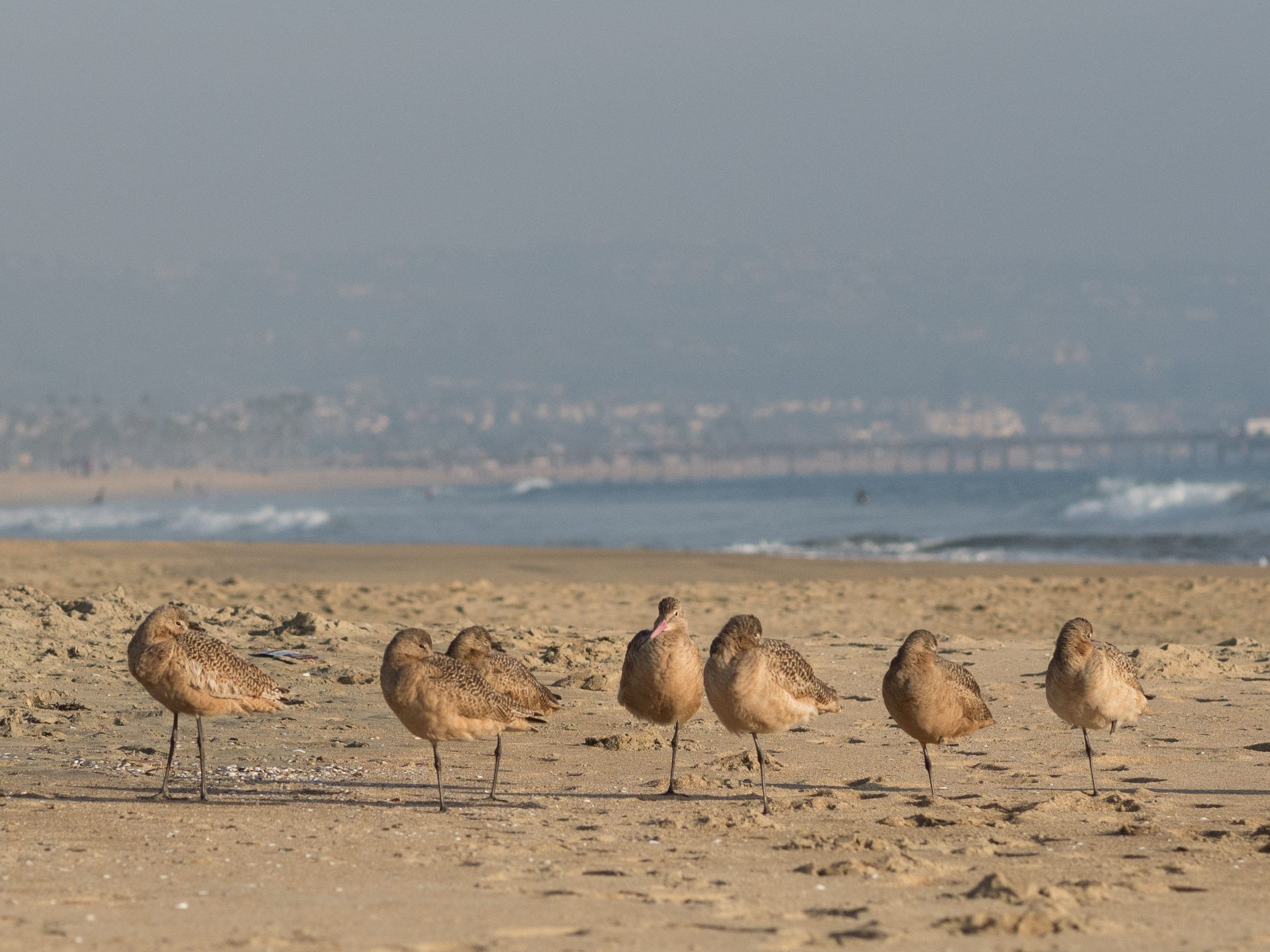
Sleeping at Balboa Peninsula, Newport Beach, California.

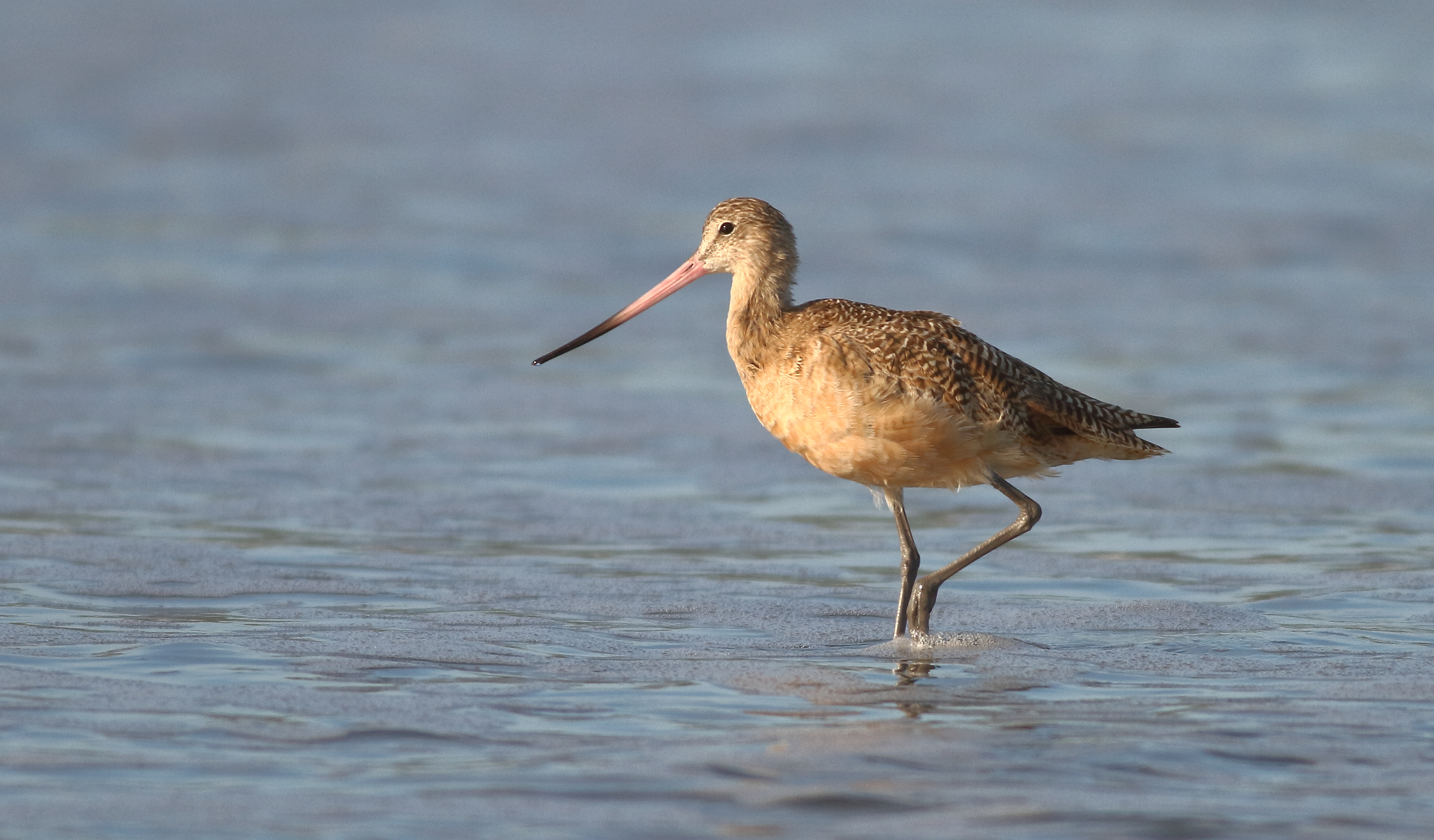
Bodega Bay, California
