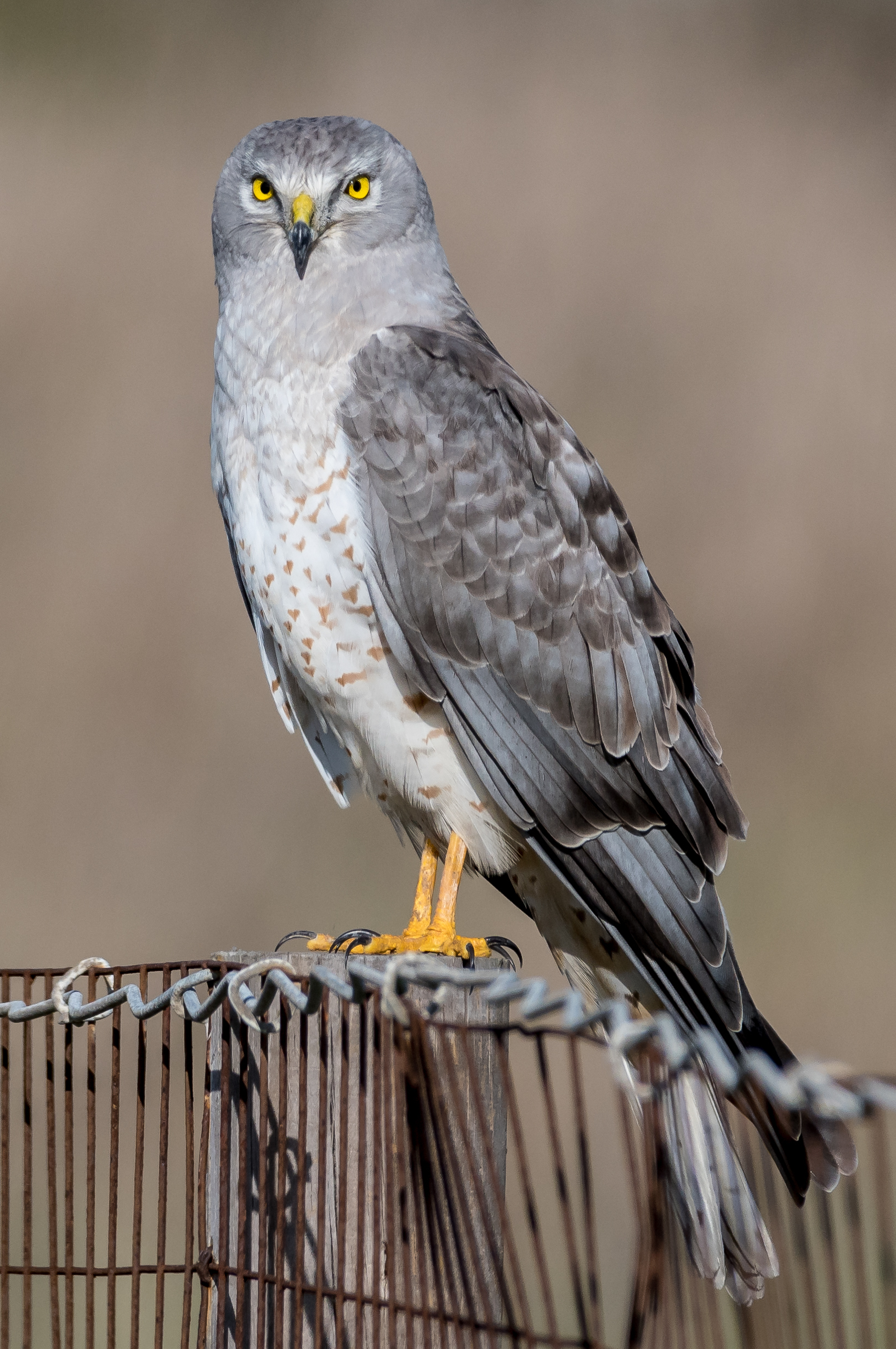
- Adult male in Berkeley, California
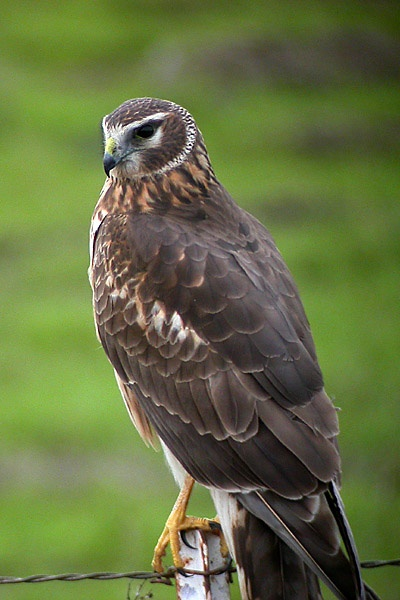
- Female, in California

Conservation status
- Least Concern (IUCN 3.1)

Scientific classification
- Kingdom: Animalia
- Phylum: Chordata
- Class: Aves
- Order: Accipitriformes
- Family: Accipitridae
- Genus: Circus
- Species: C. hudsonius

Binomial name
- Circus hudsonius (Linnaeus, 1766)
- Breeding Year-round Non-breeding Migration

Synonyms
- Circus cyaneus hudsonius

= Northern harrier =

Species of bird

The northern harrier (Circus hudsonius), also known as the marsh hawk or ring-tailed hawk, is a bird of prey. It breeds throughout the northern parts of the Northern Hemisphere in Canada and the northernmost United States.

The northern harrier migrates south in winter, with breeding birds in Canada and northern Great Plains of the U.S. moving to the American south, Mexico, and Central America. In the midwestern, mountain west, and north Atlantic states of the U.S., they may be present all year. This bird inhabits prairies, open areas, and marshes.

== Taxonomy ==
In 1750 the English naturalist George Edwards included an illustration and a description of the northern harrier in the third volume of his A Natural History of Uncommon Birds. He used the English name "The Ring-tail'd Hawk". Edwards based his hand-coloured etching on a bird collected near the Hudson Bay in Canada and brought to London by James Isham. When in 1766 the Swedish naturalist Carl Linnaeus updated his Systema Naturae for the twelfth edition, he placed the northern harrier with the falcons and eagles in the genus Falco. Linnaeus included a brief description, coined the binomial name Falco hudsonius and cited Edwards' work. The northern harrier is now placed in the genus Circus, introduced by the French naturalist Bernard Germain de Lacépède in 1799. The genus name Circus is derived from the Ancient Greek kirkos, referring to a bird of prey named for its circling flight (kirkos, "circle"). The specific epithet hudsonius is from "Hudson Bay", the type locality. The species is monotypic: no subspecies are recognised.

The northern harrier was formerly considered to be conspecific with the hen harrier.

== Description ==
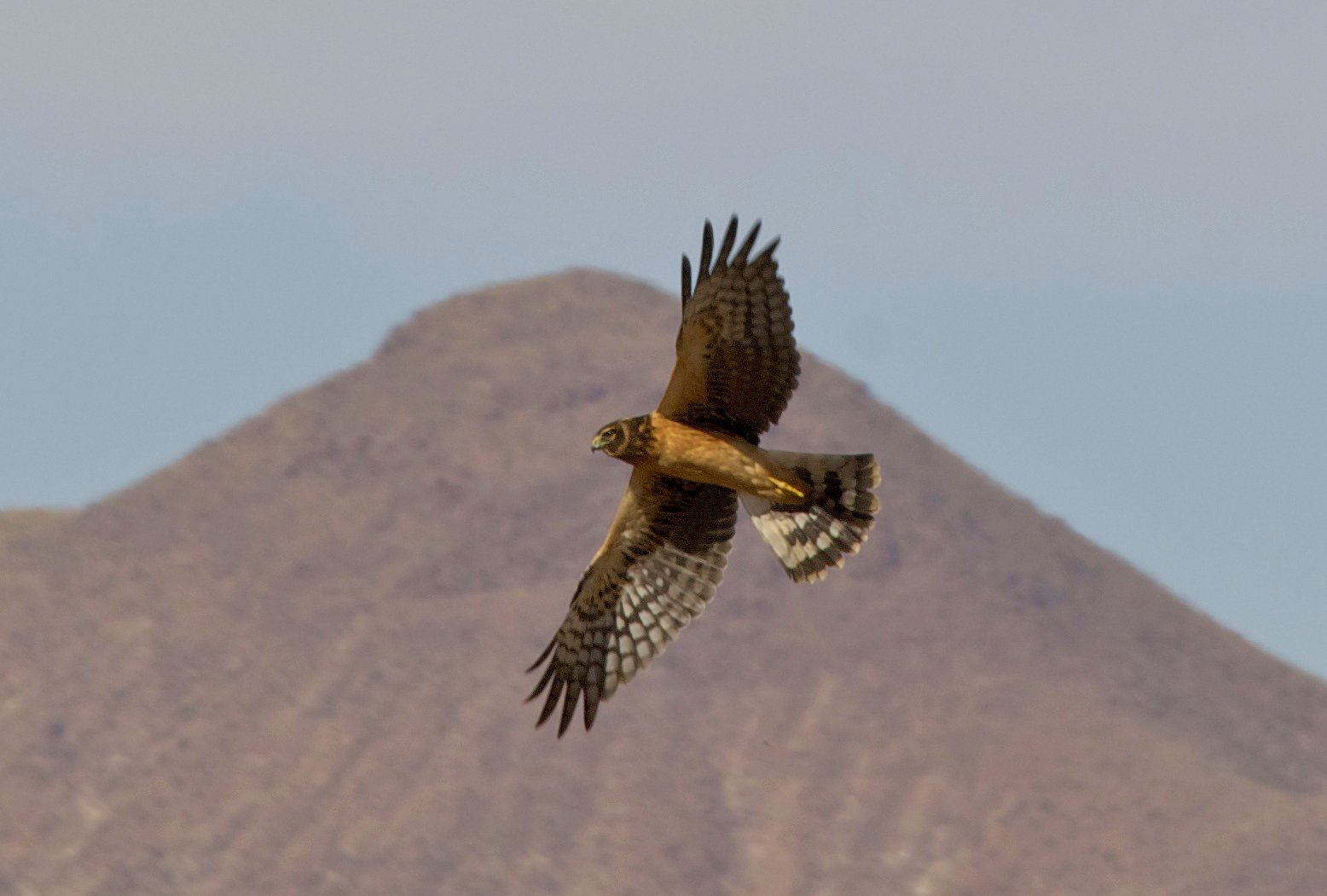
Juvenile flying at Bosque del Apache National Wildlife Refuge, USA

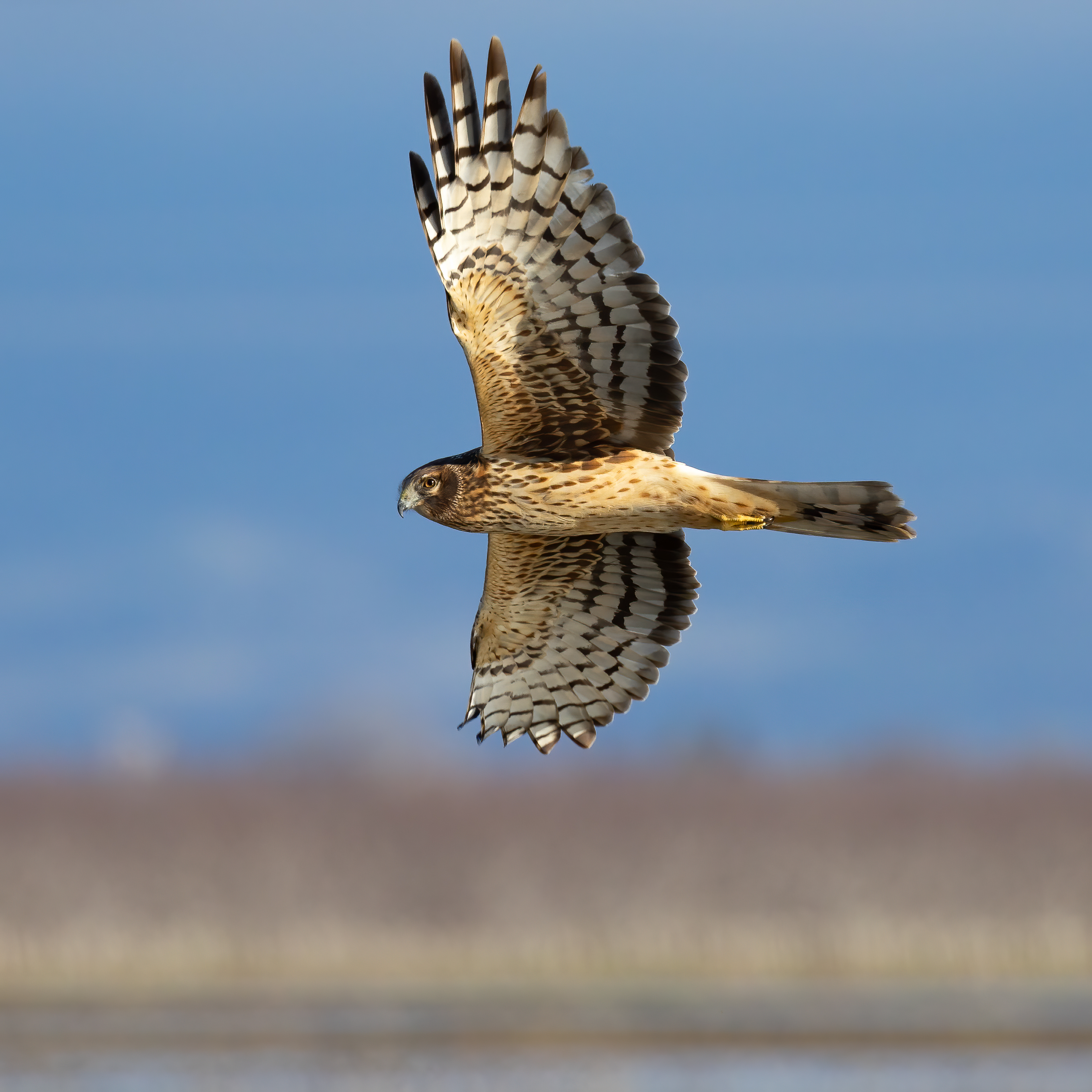
Female in flight at the Llano Seco Unit of the Sacramento National Wildlife Refuge Complex in California

The northern harrier is 41–52 cm (16–20 in) long with a 97–122 cm (38–48 in) wingspan. It resembles other harriers in having distinct male and female plumages. The sexes also differ in weight, with males weighing 290 to 400 g (10 to 14 oz), with an average of 350 g (12 oz), and females weighing 390 to 750 g (14 to 26 oz), with an average of 530 g (19 oz). Among standard measurements, the wing chord is 32.8 to 40.6 cm (12.9 to 16.0 in), the tail is 19.3 to 25.8 cm (7.6 to 10.2 in) and the tarsus is 7.1 to 8.9 cm (2.8 to 3.5 in). It is relatively long-winged and long-tailed, having the longest wing and tail relative to its body size of any raptor occurring in North America.

The northern harrier breeds in North America, and its closest relative is the cinereous harrier (C. cinereus) of South America. The male's plumage is darker grey than that of the hen harrier, and the female is also darker and more rufous. The adult male is sometimes nicknamed the "Grey Ghost", because of his striking plumage and spectral aura.

The northern harrier is mostly silent, although males and females will both give fast kek notes that will last 1-2 seconds. When faced with predators or surrounded by smaller birds, they still emit kek notes but at a higher pitch. During the mating season, the female emits a loud scream, which causes the male to either mate or provide food.

== Behaviour ==
This medium-sized raptor breeds on moorland, bogs, prairies, farmland coastal prairies, marshes, grasslands, swamps and other open areas. A male will maintain a territory averaging 2.6 km^{2} (1.0 sq mi), though male territories have ranged from 1.7 to 150 km^{2} (0.66 to 57.92 sq mi).

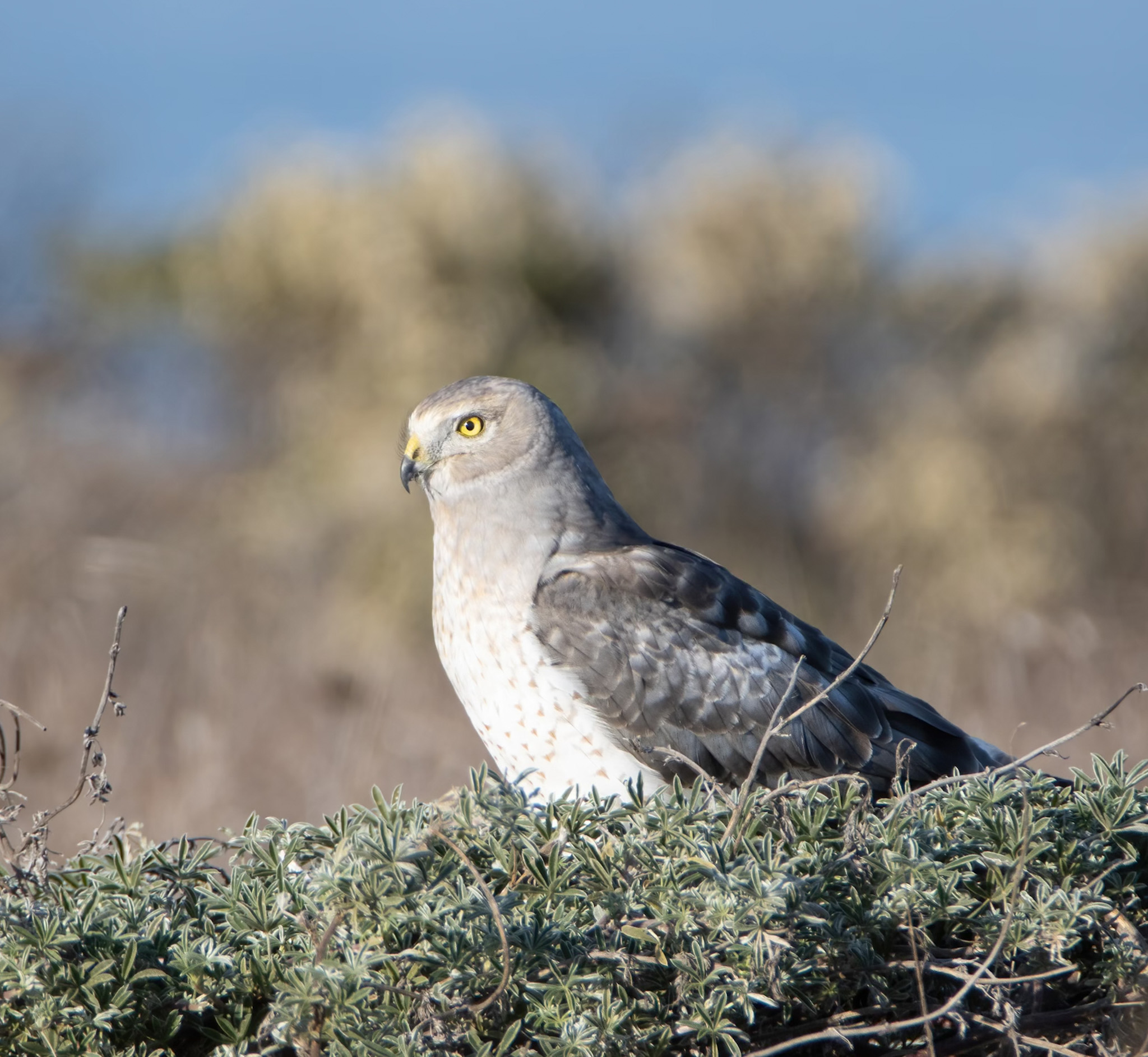
Northern harrier male perched on shrub at Point Reyes National Seashore

These are one of the few raptorial birds known to practice polygyny – one male mates with several females. Up to five females have been known to mate with one male in a season. The nest is built on the ground or on a mound of dirt or vegetation. Nests are made of sticks and are lined inside with grass and leaves. Four to eight (exceptionally 2 to 10) whitish eggs are laid. The eggs measure approximately 47 mm × 36 mm (1.9 in × 1.4 in). The eggs are incubated mostly by the female for 31 to 32 days. When incubating eggs, the female sits on the nest while the male hunts and brings food to her and the chicks. The male will help feed chicks after they hatch, but does not usually watch them for a greater period of time than around 5 minutes. The male usually passes off food to the female, which she then feeds to the young, although later the female will capture food and simply drop into the nest for her nestlings to eat. The chicks fledge at around 36 days old, though breeding maturity is not reached until 2 years in females and 3 years in males.

=== Hunting behavior ===
This is a typical harrier, which hunts on long wings held in a shallow V in its low flight during which the bird closely hugs the contours of the land below it. Northern or hen harriers hunt primarily small mammals, as do most harriers. Preferred prey species can include voles, cotton rats and ground squirrels. Up to 95% of the diet comprises small mammals. However, birds are hunted with some regularity as well, especially by males. Preferred avian prey include passerines of open country (i.e. sparrows, larks, pipits), small shorebirds and the young of waterfowl and galliforms. Supplementing the diet occasionally are amphibians (especially frogs), reptiles and insects (especially orthopterans). The species has been observed to hunt bats if these are available. Larger prey such as rabbits and adult ducks are taken sometimes and harriers have been known to subdue these by drowning them in water. Harriers hunt by surprising prey while flying low to the ground in open areas, as they drift low over fields and moors. The harriers circle an area several times listening and looking for prey. Harriers use hearing regularly to find prey, as they have exceptionally good hearing for diurnal raptors, this being the function of their owl-like facial disc. This harrier tends to be a very vocal bird while it glides over its hunting ground.

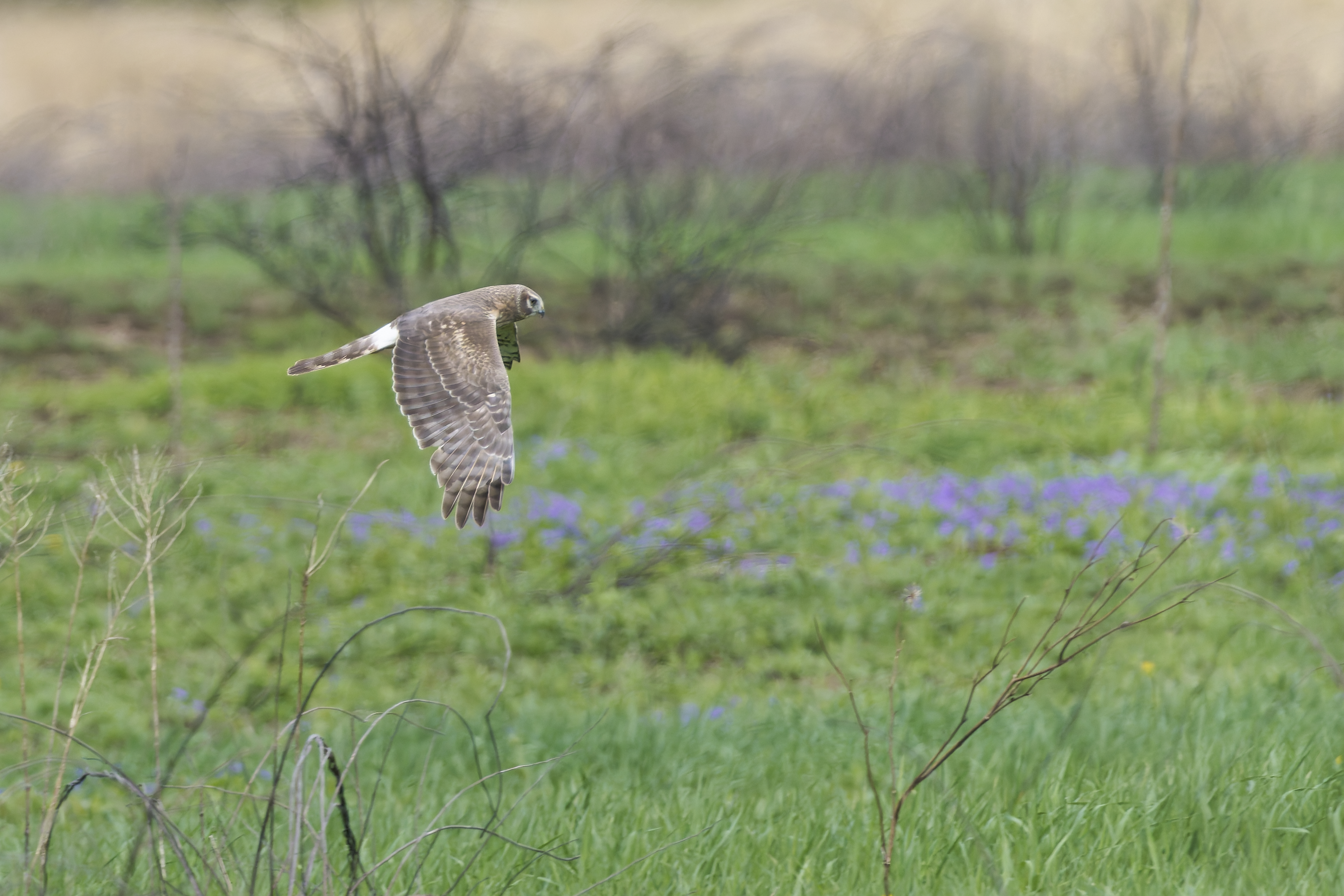
Harrier hunting low to the ground. Southwick, MA

=== Mortality and competition ===
Little information is available on longevity in northern harriers. The longest lived known bird is 16 years and 5 months. However, adults rarely live more than 8 years. Early mortality mainly results from predation. Predators of eggs and nestlings include raccoons, skunks, badgers, foxes, crows and ravens, dogs, and owls. Fledglings are also predated regularly, especially by great horned owls. Both parents attack potential predators with alarm calls and striking with talons. Short-eared owls are natural competitors of this species that favor the same prey and habitat, as well as having a similarly broad distribution. Occasionally, both harriers and short-eared owls will harass each other until the victim drops its prey and it can be stolen, a practice known as kleptoparasitism. Most commonly, the harriers are the aggressors pirating prey from owls.

== Status ==
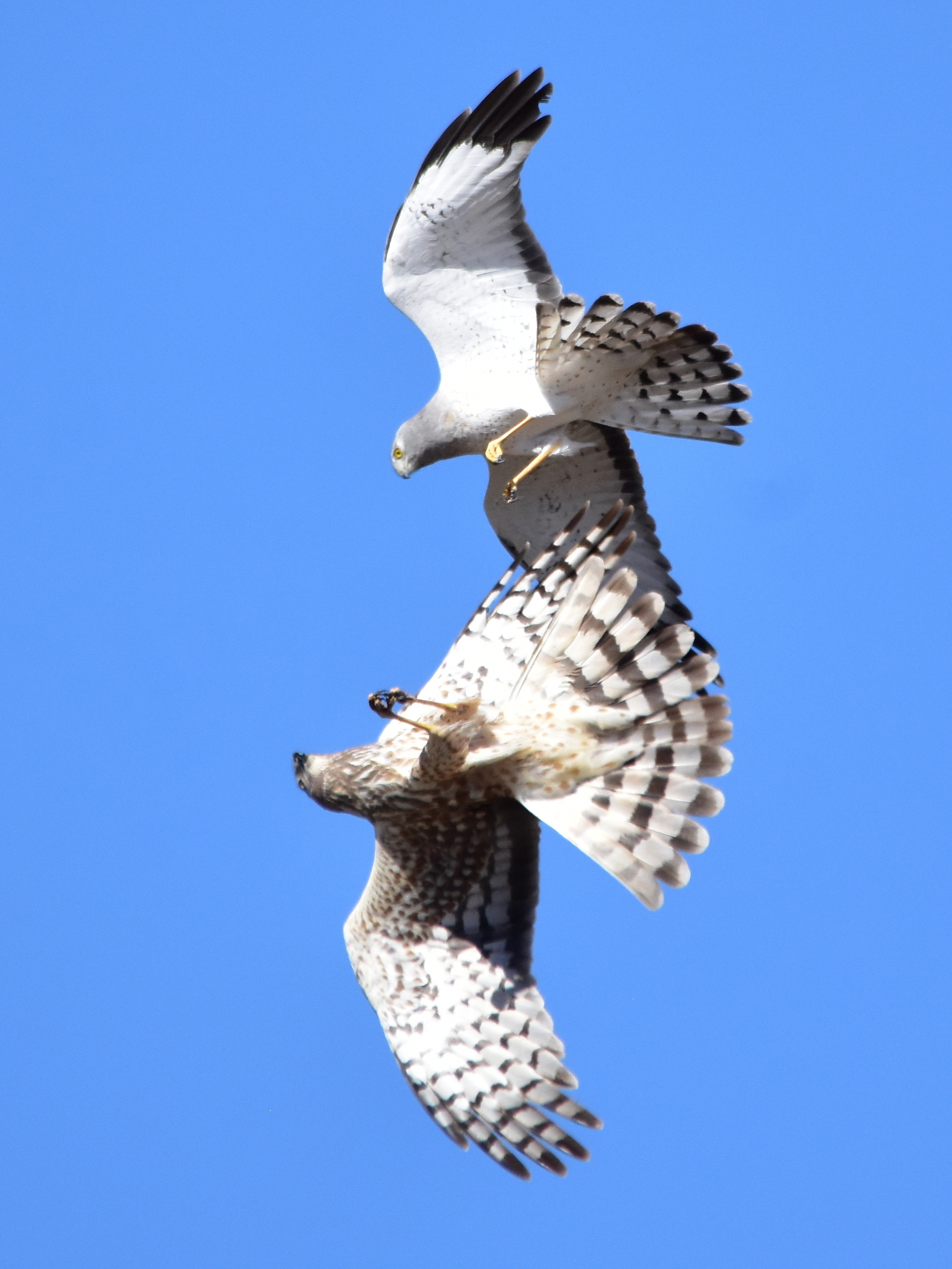
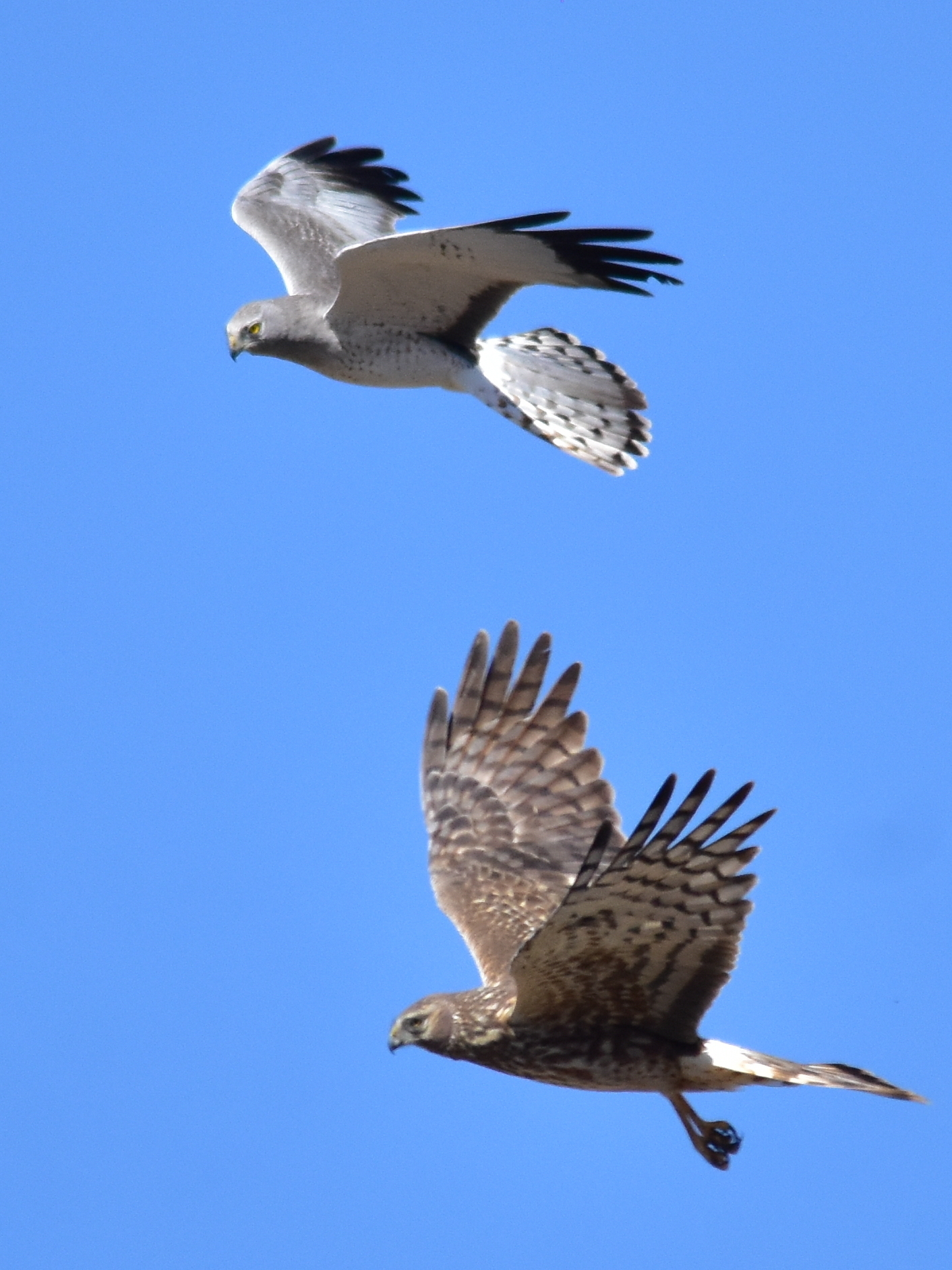
Courtship: male (top) and female (bottom)

This species has a large range, and there is evidence of a population decline, but the species is not believed to approach the thresholds for the population decline criterion of the IUCN Red List (i.e., declining more than 30% in ten years or three generations). It is therefore classified as "least concern".

== Relationship with humans ==
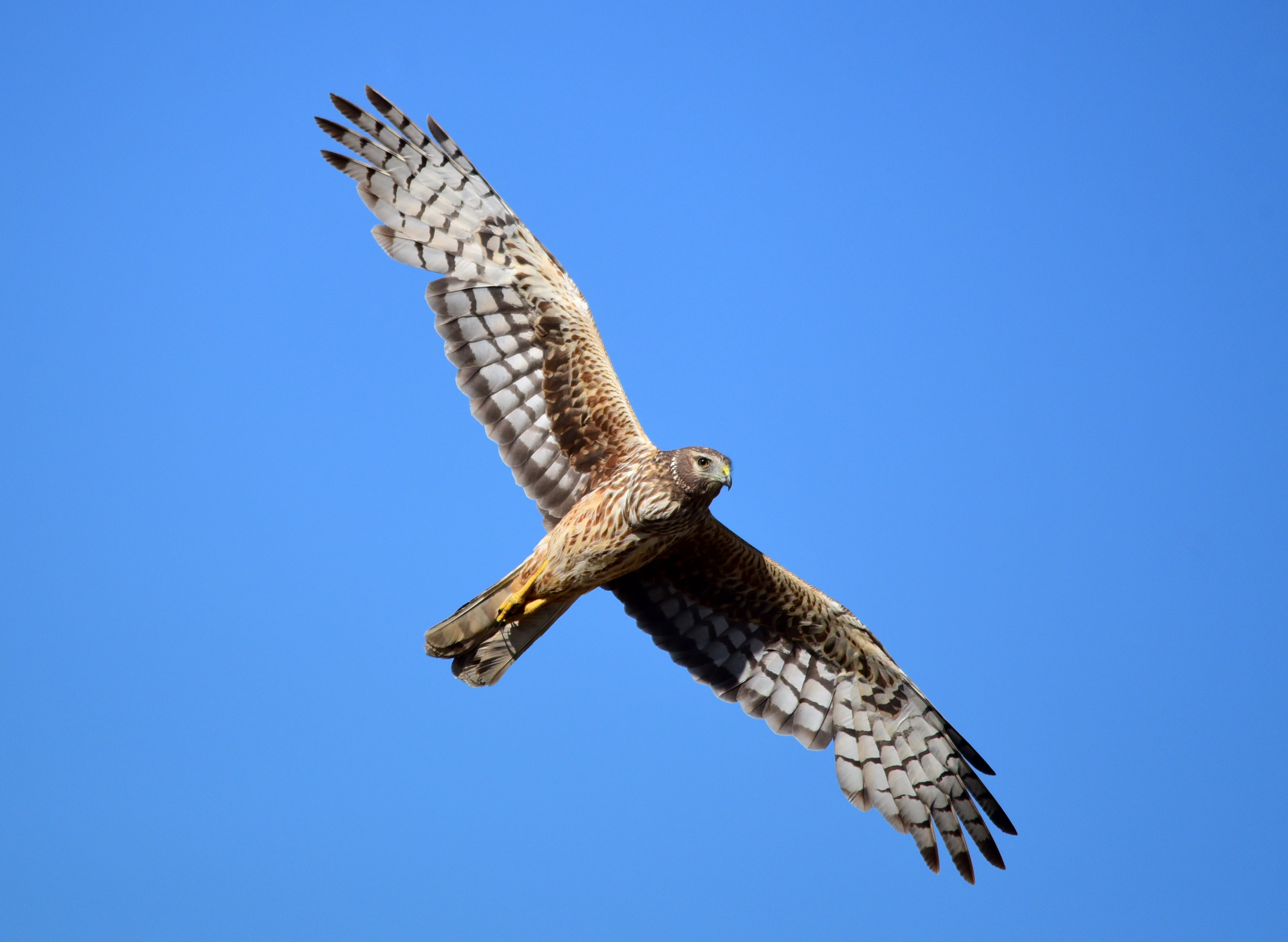
Ventral view in flight

Unlike many raptors, hen or northern harriers have historically been favorably regarded by farmers because they eat mice that damage crops and predators of quail eggs. Harriers are sometimes called "good hawks" because they pose no threat to poultry as some hawks do. Heavy pesticide use in the 1970s and 1980s caused a decline in harrier populations.
