= Aiqqujat Islands =

Island group in northern Canada

- Location in Nunavut Location in Canada

Geography
- Location: Hudson Bay's Wager Bay
- Coordinates: 65°47′N 089°15′W
- Archipelago: Arctic Archipelago

Administration
- Canada
- Nunavut: Nunavut
- Region: Kivalliq

Demographics
- Population: Uninhabited

The Aiqqujat Islands are an uninhabited island group in Kivalliq Region, Nunavut, Canada. They are located in Hudson Bay's Wager Bay, and are a part of Ukkusiksalik National Park.
