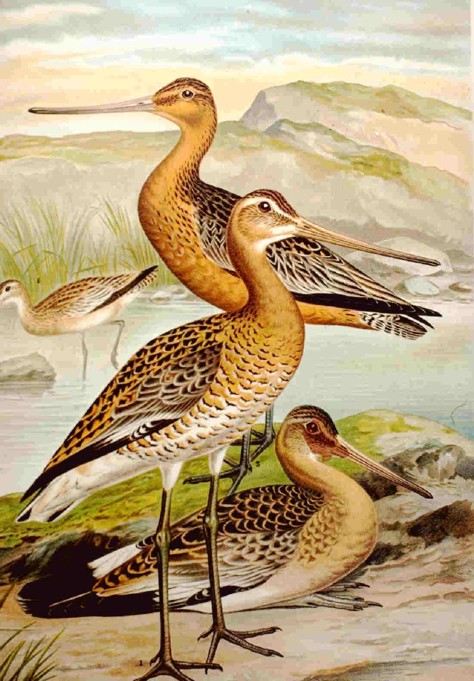
- Black-tailed (front) and bar-tailed godwit (back)

Scientific classification
- Kingdom: Animalia
- Phylum: Chordata
- Class: Aves
- Order: Charadriiformes
- Family: Scolopacidae
- Genus: Limosa; Brisson, 1760

Type species
- Scolopax limosa Linnaeus, 1758

Species
- 4, see text

= Godwit =

Godwit Temporal range: Barstovian–recent

Genus of birds

Godwits are a group of four large, long-billed, long-legged and strongly migratory waders of the bird genus Limosa. Their long bills allow them to probe deeply in the sand for aquatic worms and molluscs. In their winter range, they flock together where food is plentiful. They frequent tidal shorelines, breeding in northern climates in summer and migrating south in winter.

A female bar-tailed godwit made a flight of 29,000 km (18,000 mi), flying 11,680 km (7,260 mi) of it without stopping. In 2020 a male bar-tailed godwit flew about 12,200 km (7,600 mi) non-stop in its migration from Alaska to New Zealand, a record at the time for avian non-stop flight. In October 2022, a 5 month old, male bar-tailed godwit was tracked from Alaska to Tasmania, a trip that took 11 days, and recorded a non-stop flight of 13,500 km (8,400 mi).

The godwits can be distinguished from the curlews by their straight or slightly upturned bills, and from the dowitchers by their longer legs. The winter plumages are fairly drab, but three species have reddish underparts when breeding. The females are appreciably larger than the males.

Godwits were once popular as food in the British Isles. Sir Thomas Browne writing in about 1682 noted that godwits "were accounted the daintiest dish in England".

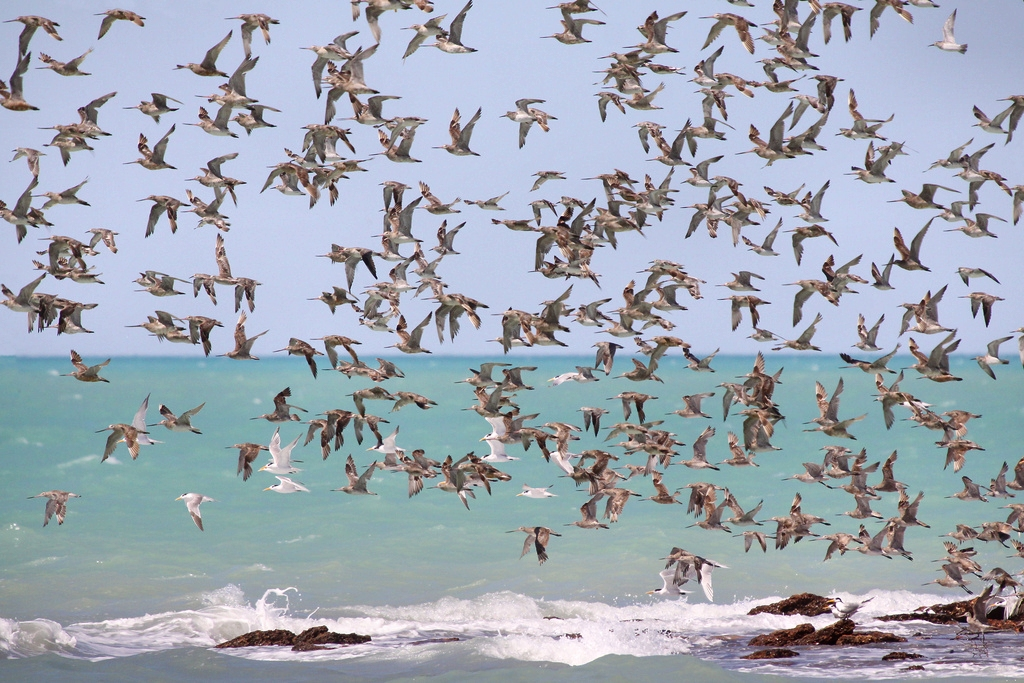
A flock of migratory waders, dominated by bar-tailed

== Taxonomy ==
The genus Limosa was introduced by the French zoologist Mathurin Jacques Brisson in 1760 with the black-tailed godwit (Limosa limosa) as the type species. The genus name Limosa is from Latin and means "muddy", from limus, "mud". The English name "godwit" was first recorded in about 1416–17 and is believed to imitate the bird's call.

The genus contains four living species:

Genus Limosa – Brisson, 1760 – four species
Common name	Scientific name and subspecies	Range	Size and ecology	IUCN status and estimated population
Bar-tailed godwit Breeding Plumage Non-Breeding Plumage	Limosa lapponica (Linnaeus, 1758) Five subspecies: L. l. lapponica (Linnaeus, 1758); L. l. yamalensis Bom et al. 2021; L. l. taymyrensis Engelmoer & Roselaar, 1998; L. l. menzbieri – Portenko, 1936; L. l. baueri – Naumann, 1836	Scandinavia to Alaska, temperate and tropical regions of Australia and New Zealand.	Size: Habitat: Diet:	NT
Black-tailed godwit Breeding Plumage Non-Breeding Plumage	Limosa limosa (Linnaeus, 1758) Four subspecies: L. l. bohaii Zhu, Piersma, Verkuil & Conklin, 2020; L. l. limosa Linnaeus, 1758; L. l. islandica Brehm, 1831; L. l. melanuroides Gould, 1846	the Indian subcontinent, Australia, New Zealand, western Europe and west Africa.	Size: Habitat: Diet:	NT
Hudsonian godwit Breeding Plumage Non-Breeding Plumage	Limosa haemastica (Linnaeus, 1758)	northern Canada and winters in southern South America.	Size: Habitat: Diet:	VU
Marbled godwit Breeding Plumage Non-Breeding Plumage	Limosa fedoa (Linnaeus, 1758) Two subspecies: L. f. beringiae Gibson & Kessel, 1989; L. f. fedoa (Linnaeus, 1758)	Atlantic, Pacific and Gulf coasts of the US and Mexico.	Size: Habitat: Diet:	VU

== Fossil species ==
In addition, there are two or three species of fossil prehistoric godwits. Limosa vanrossemi is known from the Monterey Formation (Late Miocene, approx. 6 mya) of Lompoc, United States. Limosa lacrimosa is known from the Early Pliocene of Western Mongolia (Kurochkin, 1985). Limosa gypsorum of the Late Eocene (Montmartre Formation, some 35 mya) of France may have actually been a curlew or some bird ancestral to both curlews and godwits (and possibly other Scolopacidae), or even a rail, being placed in the monotypic genus Montirallus by some (Olson, 1985). Certainly, curlews and godwits are rather ancient and in some respects primitive lineages of scolopacids, further complicating the assignment of such possibly basal forms.

In a 2001 study comparing the ratios cerebrum to brain volumes in various dinosaur species, Hans C. E. Larsson found that more derived dinosaurs generally had proportionally more voluminous cerebrum. Limosa gypsorum, then regarded as a Numenius species, was a discrepancy in this general trend. L. gypsorum was only 63% of the way between a typical reptilian ratio and that of modern birds. However, this may be explainable if the endocast was distorted, as it had been previously depicted in the past by Deschaseaux, who is described by Larsson as calling the endocast "slightly anteroposteriorly sheared and laterally compressed."

== General sources ==
- Gill, R. E. Jr.; Piersma, T.; Hufford, G.; Servranckx, R.; Riegen, A. (2005). "Crossing the ultimate ecological barrier: evidence for an 11,000-km-long non-stop flight from Alaska to New Zealand and Eastern Australia by Bar-tailed Godwits". Condor. 107: 1–20. doi:10.1650/7613. hdl:11370/531c931d-e4bd-427c-a6ad-1496c81d44c0.
- Larsson, H. C. E. 2001. Endocranial anatomy of Carcharodontosaurus saharicus (Theropoda: Allosauroidea) and its implications for theropod brain evolution. pp. 19–33. In: Mesozoic Vertebrate Life. Tanke, D. H., Carpenter, K., Skrepnick, M. W. (eds.). Indiana University Press.
- Olson, Storrs L. (1985): Section X.D.2.b. "Scolopacidae". In: Farner, D.S.; King, J.R. & Parkes, Kenneth C. (eds.): Avian Biology 8: 174–175. Academic Press, New York.
