= Geoff Smith (New Zealand cricketer) =

New Zealand cricketer

Personal information
- Full name: Geoffrey Brunton Smith
- Born: 22 November 1953 (age 72); Christchurch, New Zealand
- Batting: Right-handed
- Role: Batsman
- Relatives: Brun Smith (father); Frank Smith (grandfather)

Domestic team information
- Years: Team
- 1977-78 to 1979-80: Canterbury

Career statistics
Competition	FC	List A
Matches	7	3
Runs scored	196	32
Batting average	14.00	10.66
100s/50s	0/0	0/0
Top score	31	28
Balls bowled	0	0
Wickets	–	–
Bowling average	–	–
5 wickets in innings	–	–
10 wickets in match	–	n/a
Best bowling	–	–
Catches/stumpings	4/–	0/–
- Source: Cricinfo, 19 September 2020

Geoffrey Brunton Smith (born 22 November 1953) is a former New Zealand cricketer who played first-class and List A cricket for Canterbury from 1977 to 1979. His father, Brun Smith, played Test cricket for New Zealand, and his grandfather, Frank Smith, played first-class cricket for Canterbury in the 1920s.

Smith was a member of the New Zealand schools cricket team that toured Australia in 1970–71. In first-class cricket he scored 22 and 31 for Canterbury against Central Districts in 1978–79; he and Barry Hadlee put on 68 and 64 respectively for the opening partnership. Later that season he made 11 and 31 against Auckland, putting on opening partnerships of 51 and 54 with Hadlee.
