= William Moor =

British sailor and explorer

- Born: County Durham
- Died: 1765; Greatham, County Durham
- Occupations: Ship's captain, explorer
- Known for: Lead an expedition searching for the Northwest Passage

William Moor (died 1765) was a British sailor and explorer associated with the Hudson's Bay Company (HBC) and the annual supply ships to the bay area.

Moor was involved, under the supervision of his cousin, Christopher Middleton, with voyages to the bay from about 1730 to 1741 and carried out increasingly important duties during that period. In 1741 he and Middleton left the HBC's employ and Moor was given command of HMS Discovery to aid his cousin in HMS Furnace in a search for the Northwest Passage. They overwintered at Prince of Wales Fort where sickness plagued the crews. Their survey of the shoreline and tides of the west side of Hudson Bay was not particularly successful.

Moor and Middleton and the 1741–1742 expedition were under the scrutiny of Arthur Dobbs, an opponent of the HBC monopoly of the bay area. Middleton was accused of protecting the HBC monopoly and Moor took the side of Dobbs. In 1746, Moor was in command of a private discovery expedition to Hudson Bay funded by Dobbs and others. After a short and unsuccessful period of exploration by the two ships, they decided to overwinter at the HBC post at York Factory.

The next summer some good exploration was carried out on the western shore and discovered Chesterfield Inlet but did not fully explore it. He also examined Rankin Inlet and Wager Bay. At a point, after further exploration, illness and threats of mutiny turned the expedition for home.

Moor's competence as a commander was called into question on his return. There is little doubt that his weakness and uncertainty affected the expedition but the unhappiness of the investors was also because he refused to engage in illegal trade on their behalf.

Moor appears to have retired around this time. His explorations did add significantly to the knowledge of the area despite his problems with the command of the expedition.

West coast of Hudson's Bay

Wager Bay

Rankin Inlet

Chesterfield Inlet
