= Frank Smith (footballer, born 1897) =

English footballer

Frank William Smith (13 October 1897 – July 1988) was an English footballer. He started playing competitive football as an inside forward, but converted to a wing half during his Football League career.

Smith started his football career in the town of his birth with Kettering Town, before Watford paid a fee of £125 for his services in March 1921. He remained at the Hertfordshire-based club for the rest of his career, making 319 appearances in the Football League, and a further 22 in the FA Cup. Following his retirement from football in 1932, Smith remained in Hertfordshire, and became a bus driver. He died in July 1988 in St Albans, aged 90.
