= Frank Vining Smith =

American painter

- Born: 1879; Whitman, Massachusetts, U.S.
- Died: July 30, 1967 (aged 87–88); Hingham, Massachusetts, U.S.
- Education: Art Students League of New York
- Occupation: Painter

Frank Vining Smith (1879 - July 30, 1967) was an American marine painter who specialized in sailing ships. His paintings can be seen at the Eastern Yacht Club and the Grosse Pointe Yacht Club.
