= Frank Smith (cricketer, born 1893) =

New Zealand cricketer

Personal information
- Full name: Frank Aston Smith
- Born: 21 March 1893; Kaiapoi, North Canterbury, New Zealand
- Died: 18 October 1975 (aged 82); Christchurch, Canterbury, New Zealand
- Batting: Right-handed
- Relatives: Brun Smith (son); Geoff Smith (grandson)

Domestic team information
- Years: Team
- 1922-23: Canterbury

Career statistics
Competition	FC
Matches	2
Runs scored	58
Batting average	14.50
100s/50s	0/0
Top score	39
Balls bowled	0
Wickets	–
Bowling average	–
5 wickets in innings	–
10 wickets in match	–
Best bowling	–
Catches/stumpings	1/–
- Source: CricketArchive, 19 September 2020

Frank Aston Smith (21 March 1893 – 18 October 1975) was a New Zealand cricketer who played two matches of first-class cricket for Canterbury in the 1922–23 season. His son Brun played Test cricket for New Zealand.

Smith worked as a carpenter in Christchurch. In World War I he served overseas as a sapper with the New Zealand Engineers. He married Mary Catherine Brunton (1891–1971) in June 1921. He died in Christchurch in October 1975, aged 82.
