= HMS Discovery (1741) =

British Royal Navy small ship

HMS Discovery was a small ship, commissioned in 1741. She was commanded by Lieutenant William Moor as she accompanied the larger HMS Furnace, commanded by his cousin, Christopher Middleton, on an expedition to Hudson's Bay, to search for the Northwest Passage.

Like many other vessels the Royal Navy used for exploration, Discovery was a converted collier. She displaced 150 tons.
