= Francis Smith (Missouri politician) =

American politician and lawyer

Francis Smith (October 7, 1905 – March 7, 1984) was an American Democratic politician and lawyer who has served in the Missouri General Assembly. He was first elected to the Missouri Senate in 1938 after serving two terms in the Missouri House of Representatives.

Born in St. Louis, Missouri, he was educated in the public schools of St. Joseph, Missouri. Smith was secretary of the Democratic City Committee in St. Joseph for three terms and was assistant Prosecuting Attorney for Buchanan County from 1927 until 1930.

On June 12, 1937, he married Elizabeth Douglas, who died in 2011 at the age of 101.

He died in St. Joseph on March 7, 1984.
