= Brun Smith =

New Zealand cricketer (1922–1997)

- The New Zealand Test team, Christchurch, March 1947. Brun Smith is furthest right in the front row.

Personal information
- Full name: Frank Brunton Smith
- Born: 13 March 1922; Rangiora, Canterbury, New Zealand
- Died: 6 July 1997 (aged 75); Christchurch, Canterbury, New Zealand
- Nickname: Runty
- Batting: Right-handed
- Bowling: Right-arm offbreak
- Relatives: Frank Smith (father); Geoff Smith (son)

International information
- National side: New Zealand (1947-1952)
- Test debut (cap 42): 21 March 1947 v England
- Last Test: 8 February 1952 v West Indies

Domestic team information
- Years: Team
- 1946/47–1952/53: Canterbury

Career statistics
Competition	Test	First-class
Matches	4	49
Runs scored	237	2643
Batting average	47.40	33.03
100s/50s	0/2	4/14
Top score	96	153
Balls bowled	0	117
Wickets	–	1
Bowling average	–	76.00
5 wickets in innings	–	0
10 wickets in match	–	0
Best bowling	–	1/6
Catches/stumpings	1/–	21/–
- Source: Cricinfo, 1 April 2017

Frank Brunton Smith (13 March 1922 – 6 July 1997) was a New Zealand cricketer who played in four Tests between 1947 and 1952. He played first-class cricket for Canterbury from 1946 to 1953. His father Frank played for Canterbury in the 1920s; Brun's son Geoff played for Canterbury in the 1970s.

== Cricket career ==
An aggressive middle-order batsman, Brun Smith played for Canterbury in the Plunket Shield from 1946–47 to 1952–53. After scoring 106 out of a Canterbury total of 194 against Auckland in January 1947, he made his Test debut against England a few weeks later, scoring 18. He was not in the original selected team, but was included just before the match to replace the injured Stewie Dempster. His highest first-class score was 153 for Canterbury against Otago in Christchurch in the 1948–49 season, when his 392 runs at 56.00 helped Canterbury to win the Plunket Shield.

Smith toured England in 1949, scoring 1008 runs at 28.00, and playing two Tests. In the First Test at Headingley, he scored 96 in two hours in the first innings and 54 in the second. He made 23 in the Second Test, and was then replaced by John Reid, who was making his Test debut, for the Third and Fourth Tests.

Smith played in the First Test against the West Indies at Christchurch in 1951–52, top-scoring in the second innings with 37 despite a strained leg muscle. It was his last Test. For many years, his Test average of 47.40 placed him third (after Stewie Dempster and Martin Donnelly) among New Zealanders with 200 or more Test runs. He succeeded Walter Hadlee as captain of Canterbury during the 1951–52 season and led them to victory in the Plunket Shield.

Dick Brittenden said, "Smith's batting was always violent, usually brilliant. Not that it was always a sound proposition." In 1952, The Cricketer's New Zealand correspondent noted that, while the 1951-52 Plunket Shield season was characterized by an excess of cautious batting, "Smith, perhaps, went to the other extreme". He once scored a century before lunch for Canterbury, and hit 155 in 62 minutes in a club game in Christchurch.

== Outside cricket ==
Smith attended Christchurch Boys' High School, where in 1940 he received the Deans Scholarship, which is awarded annually to a boy in his final year "who in the highest degree exhibits the qualities of intellect, athletic ability, leadership and character". He served in the New Zealand Army in World War II as a signalman. He was later a primary school teacher and principal in Christchurch.
