= Frances Hagell Smith =

New Zealand missionary teacher and welfare worker

Frances Hagell Smith (1877–1948) was a notable New Zealand missionary teacher and welfare worker. She was born in Oamaru, North Otago, New Zealand in 1877.
