= Frank Kingston Smith =

American radio disk jockey

Frank Kingston Smith Jr.
- Born: Philadelphia, Pennsylvania, U.S.
- Occupation: Radio disk jockey
- Years active: 1966–present
- Parent: Frank Kingston Smith Sr. (father)

Frank Kingston Smith, Jr., is an American radio disk jockey who worked extensively in Top 40 and oldies formatted AM and FM stations in major Northeastern United States markets for almost three decades.

A native of Philadelphia, Pennsylvania, Smith worked at stations such as WFIL and WIBG, Philadelphia (1966; 1970); WICE, Providence (1967–68); WRKO, Boston, under the Bill Drake-assigned name "Bobby Mitchell" (1968–70); and WABC, New York (1971–74). At WRKO, "Mitchell" preceded Boston radio legend Dale Dorman as the morning personality (on one of his first days on the job, he was preempted by coverage of the assassination of Robert F. Kennedy), and was the successor to another Hub radio luminary, J. J. Jeffrey, in the afternoon drive slot.

In 1974, Smith returned to Boston radio, where he worked for almost 20 years at many of the city's "contemporary hit," mainstream and oldies music stations: WHDH (1974–75); WVBF (1975–78); WBZ (1978–79); WRKO again, this time under his real name (1979–81); WROR (1981–1985); WKKT (became WZLX, 1985–88); and WODS (1988–93).

A private pilot for many years, Smith also has served as master of ceremonies at air shows throughout the USA. He relocated to the Phoenix, Arizona, area in late 1993 and has continued to work as a host of such events and as a voice-over artist.

Smith's father, Frank Kingston Smith, Sr., was a well known and highly respected aviation writer. He wrote sixteen books and hundreds of magazine articles about private aviation.
