= Frank Smith (footballer, born 1889) =

English footballer

Personal information
- Full name: Frank Smith
- Date of birth: 22 November 1889
- Place of birth: Darnall, England
- Date of death: 1982 (aged 92–93)
- Height: 5 ft 8 in (1.73 m)
- Position: Wing half

Senior career*
Years	Team	Apps	(Gls)
1913–1914	Sheffield		
1914–1920	Barnsley	26	(0)
1920–1921	Swansea Town	1	(0)
1921–1922	Grimsby Town	4	(0)
1922–1923	Charlton's		
1923–1924	Haycroft Rovers		
1924–192?	Louth Town		
- * Club domestic league appearances and goals

Frank Smith (22 November 1889 – 1982) was an English professional footballer who played as a wing half.
