= Frank J. Smith (Illinois politician) =

American politician (1893–1977)

Member of the Illinois House of Representatives
- In office 1953–1973

Personal details
- Born: April 7, 1893 Chicago, Illinois, U.S.
- Died: November 15, 1977 (aged 84) Evergreen Park, Illinois, U.S.
- Party: Democratic
- Spouse: Mary Johnston (died 1965)
- Children: 7
- Profession: Engineer

Frank J. Smith (April 7, 1893 – November 15, 1977) was an American politician who served as a Democratic member of the Illinois House of Representatives.

== Career ==
Smith was an engineer. He was elected to the Illinois House of Representatives in 1952 and retired at the 1972 election.

== Personal life and death ==
Smith lived in Chicago. He and his wife, Mary (née Johnston), had seven children. Smith was a Catholic.

Smith died at a hospital in Evergreen Park, Illinois, on November 15, 1977. A 1965 Illinois Blue Book entry lists his birth date as April 7, 1893, meaning he would have been 84 when he died. However, an obituary in the Chicago Tribune gives his age at death as 90.
