= Wager Bay =

Bay in Nunavut, Canada

- Ukkusiksalik Bay
- Location within Nunavut
- Location: Kivalliq, Nunavut
- Coordinates: 65°26′N 88°40′W
- Type: Inlet
- Etymology: Sir Charles Wager
- Part of: Ukkusiksalik National Park
- Primary outflows: Roes Welcome Sound
- Catchment area: 28,551 km^{2} (11,024 sq mi)
- Basin countries: Canada
- Shore length^{1}: 150 km (93 mi)
- Surface elevation: 51 m (167 ft)
- Islands: Savage Islands, Paliak Islands
- ^{1} Shore length is not a well-defined measure.

Wager Bay or Ukkusiksalik Bay is long narrow inlet in the Kivalliq Region of Nunavut, Canada, which opens east into Roes Welcome Sound at the northwest end of Hudson Bay. Ukkusiksalik National Park surrounds it.

== History ==
Wager Bay was first charted by Christopher Middleton during his Arctic explorations of 1742. He named it after Sir Charles Wager and was trapped in the bay for three weeks until the ice cleared in Roes Welcome Sound. In 1747, William Moor sent boat parties to the head of the bay.

== Geography ==
The bay is a long inlet stretching through tundra; its shoreline measures 150 km (93 mi) in length. The elevation is 51 m (167 ft) above mean sea level. It drains an area of 28,551 km^{2} (11,024 sq mi), through numerous small rivers, including the Brown River and Sila River. North Lake, South Lake, Brown Lake, and Ford Lake are nearby.
