= James Isham =

Canadian fur trader and diarist

James Isham (1716–1761) was chief factor (master) at both York Factory and Fort Prince of Wales in Canada during the mid-1700s. He kept detailed journals that described life in the region, including flora and fauna that were unknown to people in England at that time. His journals are important historical documents and he is well known to scholars of the fur trade in Canada during the early years of the Hudson's Bay Company (HBC).

== Early years ==
James Isham was born in 1716 in Holborn, London, to Whitby Isham and Ann Scrimshire, and was christened at St. Andrew Holborn. He had a brother, Thomas, and a sister, Ann.

James Isham shared a common ancestry with the Baronets of Lamport. In the late 1500s, Eusby Isham and Anne Pulton had ten children. Their son, John, was the grandfather of the first hereditary baronet and his brother, Henry, was James Isham's third (three-times) great-grandfather. The lineage of the Isham family can be traced back to Azor in the Domesday Book of 1086.

Isham left England in 1732 at the age of sixteen to work as a clerk/bookkeeper for the Hudson's Bay Company (HBC) in North America. He was posted to (also called York Fort) at the mouth of the Hayes River and the Nelson River in Hudson Bay where Thomas McCliesh was master and Thomas White was second-in-command.

== Fur trader and chief factor ==
Isham became chief factor at York Fort in 1737 at the age of twenty-one after five years of service. He continued in this position until his death in 1761. His biographer, E.E. Rich, concluded that he was "the most acute and careful observer, the most sympathetic administrator, and the most voluminous writer of the fifty years which he represents. Neither heroic nor brilliant, Isham was also neither rash nor obstinate; he stood very near to his problems and he spared no pains. His character and his knowledge emerge clearly in his writings; most clearly emerges his thirst for knowledge."

Isham was responsible for the well-being and discipline of his men, the efficient running of the fort, and good relations with the Cree and Assiniboine traders who brought furs from further inland. The forts operated on an annual cycle that began with the arrival of the HBC supply ship from London. Once the trading goods and provisions were off-loaded and the furs put on board, the ship left until the following summer. Isham's attention then turned to repairing the fort, stockpiling food and firewood for the winter, and preparing trading goods for the spring season. At Christmas, all of the men who had been away hunting or fishing returned to the fort for the festivities. As soon as the ice disappeared on rivers, traders arrived and for several months Isham dealt with large flotillas of canoes loaded with furs. His men stacked and pressed the furs into bales in preparation for the ship which generally arrived in mid-August.

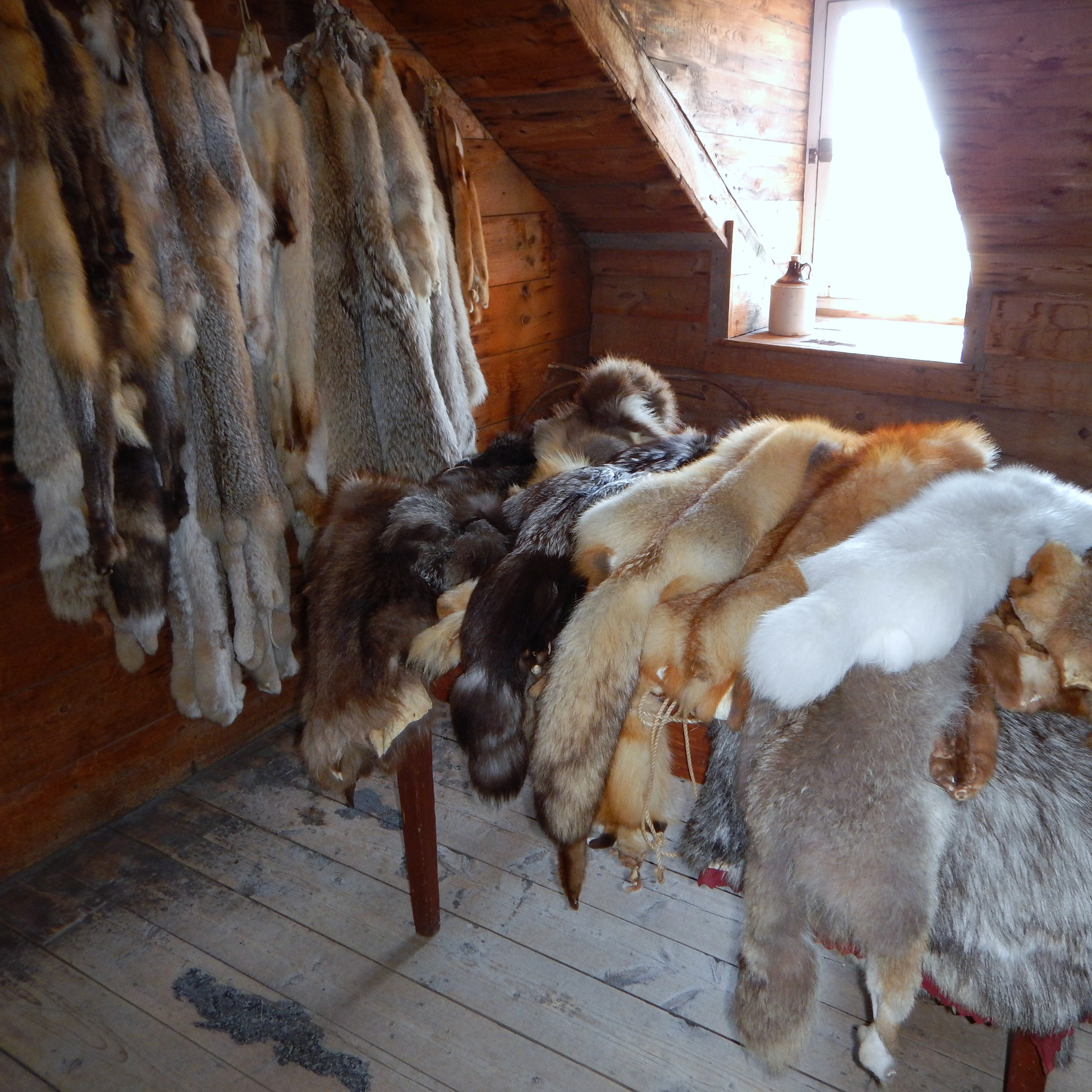
In addition to beaver, which was the mainstay of the fur trade, trappers also brought fox, marten, wolf and other furs to the forts on Hudson Bay

Isham was transferred to Fort Prince of Wales at the mouth of the Churchill River in 1741. As chief factor, he had two challenges to deal with – two exploration ships planned to stay there for the winter; and the stone fort needed to be rebuilt. The ships commanded by Christopher Middleton were searching for the Northwest Passage through Arctic waters to Asia. The presence of one hundred additional men (Isham had only forty) put a strain on resources and created tension between him and Middleton. The second challenge was the fort, which was built of stone following a military design popular in Europe. Unfortunately, the previous factor (Richard Norton) had taken shortcuts and workmanship was shoddy. Isham needed to renovate, included extending the ramparts to accommodate the recoil of the cannons.

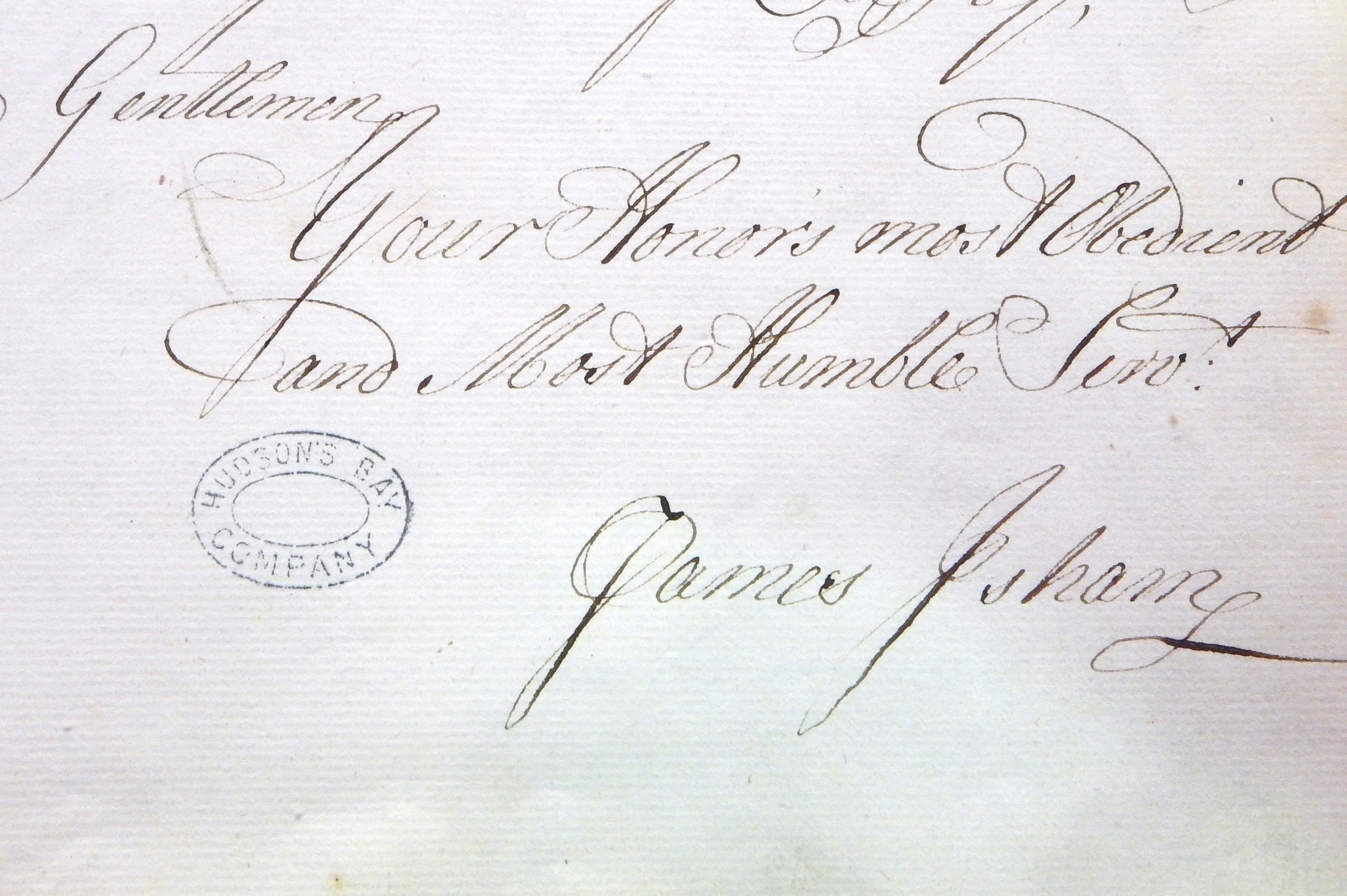
James Isham signed the post journal at the end of each fiscal year before it was sent on the annual supply ship to the HBC Committee in London.

== Isham’s observations ==
James Isham was curious about the new world he encountered on Hudson Bay. In 1743, he compiled his notes and sketches for the HBC's London Committee (board of directors). His ‘Observations on Hudson Bay, 1743’ were placed in the HBC Archives in London until his biographer published them two hundred years later. Isham's "Observations" includes descriptions of mammals and birds, as well as customs and the language of the Cree people.

In 1745, he returned briefly to London and while there delivered stuffed specimens of unusual birds to George Edwards who was writing a book, ‘A Natural History of Uncommon Birds’. Edwards acknowledged Isham's "commendable curiosity" and thanked him for providing "thirty different species of Birds, of which we have hitherto had little or no knowledge". Edwards created paintings for the book based on Isham's specimens, including the Snow Goose, Surf Scoter, Sharp-tailed Grouse, Whooping Crane, Sandhill Crane, and Sora.

Isham also wrote an extensive dictionary of "English & Indian" with common words, phrases, and sentences in Cree. Although he intended the dictionary to be used by future HBC servants to improve communication with their clients, he had no reliable way to record the Cree language since no phonetic script or scientific study of languages had yet been developed. The value of the dictionaries nowadays is that they provide a comprehensive sample of English words and phrases used in trade negotiations and everyday life at the forts. He was the first known person to bring certain Cree words into English – ne may cu sheeck (namaycush) for lake trout; shaganappi for rawhide thong; wa pis ka john (whiskey jack) for Canada jay; weywey (wavy) for Snow Goose.

== Later life ==
In 1746, Isham returned to the Bay and once again became chief factor at York Factory. For the second time in his career, two ships spent the winter in the vicinity of the fort. The crews of the Dobbs Galley and the California were looking for the Northwest Passage and, just as with the earlier voyage by Middleton, they were unsuccessful. Isham was pulled into the conflict between the two captains, William Moor and Frances Smith, during their time at York Factory. When they returned to England one of the crew published an article critical of Isham's support.

In 1748, Isham was recalled to England again. While there, he published a rebuttal to ‘A Voyage to Hudson’s Bay in the Dobbs Galley’ written by Henry Ellis. Isham was also one of the witnesses who testified before the British Parliament in 1749 when the HBC Charter was challenged. Eventually, the Charter was confirmed.

In the last decade of his career, Isham turned his attention to the French competition trading out of Montreal. The voyageurs made annual trips in large canoes, meeting the indigenous people in their own territories and returning in the fall to Montreal with a load of furs. Gradually, they built a series of forts along the HBC river routes so they could intercept the Cree and Assiniboine traders before they reached York Factory and other forts on the Bay. In 1754, Isham sent the first of nine groups of men inland to encourage distant tribes to come to York Factory to trade. Anthony Henday led the first group and became known as the first European to see the eastern edge of the Rocky Mountains. Subsequent trips organized by Isham had some success in bringing clients to the Bay and they also increased the HBC's knowledge of inland routes, which would be essential in the following years when the company began to build forts inland to compete with the Montreal traders.

Isham died on April 13, 1761, of kidney failure, following twenty years of gout and kidney stones. He was buried at York Factory (the second site, which was abandoned a few years later).

== Descendants ==
James Isham married Catherine Mindham in 1748 on one of his trips to London. They had a daughter, Mary Lillys, who was christened at Saint Martin in the Fields, Westminster in 1750. Isham left for Hudson Bay soon after and saw his English wife and daughter only once when he returned in 1758 to deal with family business.

In 1754, his son, Charles Thomas Isham, was born at York Factory. The boy's mother was likely Swampy Cree but her name is unknown. In James Isham's will, he left everything to his son who also spent his career with the HBC.

Charles Thomas Isham married a Cree woman according to local custom and they had four children – Thomas, Mary, Jane and James. All four children were named in Charles’ will.

Jane Isham (sometimes Asham) married Joseph Heywood, who was a labourer and canoe man with the HBC from 1804 to 1820. They had three children – Charles, Ann and Elizabeth Heywood. When Heywood returned to England, Jane married Adam Mowat, an HBC labourer from the Orkney Islands.

The 1870 Manitoba Census shows that James Isham's great-grandchildren, Charles, Ann and Elizabeth Heywood, were all living in the Red River Settlement (Winnipeg). Charles (1814–1890) married Margaret Cook (1816–1858). Ann (1815–1898) married George Adams (1796–1865). Elizabeth (1818–1897) married James Knight Junior (1818–1897).
