= Christopher Middleton (navigator) =

18th-century British navigator

Christopher Middleton FRS

Personal details
- Born: Unknown date, c. 1690 Newton Bewley, England
- Died: 12 February 1770 (aged 79–80) Norton, Durham, England
- Occupation: Explorer, navigator
- Employer: Hudson's Bay Company
- Works: "The Effects of Cold" (1743)
- Awards: Royal Society of London's Copley Medal (1742)

Military service
- Branch: Royal Navy
- Service years: 1741–1770

Christopher Middleton FRS (c. 1690 – 12 February 1770) was a British navigator with the Hudson's Bay Company and Royal Navy officer. He was elected a Fellow of the Royal Society on 7 April 1737.

== Career ==
=== Privateer in Queen Anne's War ===
Middleton described serving aboard a privateer in Queen Anne's War. The war was fought between 1702 and 1713.

=== Hudson's Bay Company service ===
Middleton was appointed second mate of the Hannah, in 1721, and appointed her captain in 1725. He eventually made 16 annual voyages on ships supplying Hudson Bay Company outposts.

Middleton was a scientific sailor, and he methodically observed compass deviations, on his voyages. Hudson's Bay was close to the location of the North Magnetic Pole. Middleton published a paper, describing his observations, in the Royal Society's Philosophical Transactions. Middleton's scientific endeavours earned him a Fellowship in the Royal Society.

=== Northwest Passage ===
Middleton's Northwest Passage expedition established Wager Bay was just a deep bay, not an outlet to the Pacific Ocean

On 5 March 1741, Middleton was appointed to the command of HMS Furnace, a Royal Navy bomb vessel which was refitted at Deptford Dockyard and rigged as a three-masted ship. In May, he left England on Furnace, accompanied by a smaller vessel, the purchased HMS Discovery, under the command of William Moor, and sailed to Hudson Bay in search of a Northwest Passage.

He spent the winter at Fort Churchill, and then proceeded north into Roes Welcome Sound and discovered Wager Inlet, where he was iced in for three weeks. At the head of the sound he found himself blocked by ice, and named the place Repulse Bay.

Middleton returned to England in 1742, where he was presented with the Royal Society's Copley Medal, to whom he presented a paper entitled "The effects of cold; together with observations of the longitude, latitude, and declination of the magnetic needle, at Prince of Wales's fort, upon Churchill-River in Hudson's Bay, North America".

Middleton was given command of HMS Shark in May 1745, and commanded her until 1748, when peace was negotiated with Spain. Royal Navy officers were entitled to half-pay when not employed, and Middleton spent the rest of his life on half-pay. He went back to the Hudson's Bay Company and requested a command, without success.

== See also ==
- Arthur Dobbs
