= Finback =

Finback may refer to:

- Alternate name for a Fin whale
- USS Finback the names of two US Navy submarines
- Finback (whaler)
- The Shenyang J-8's Nato reporting name
