= Duke of York Bay =

Bay in Nunavut, Canada

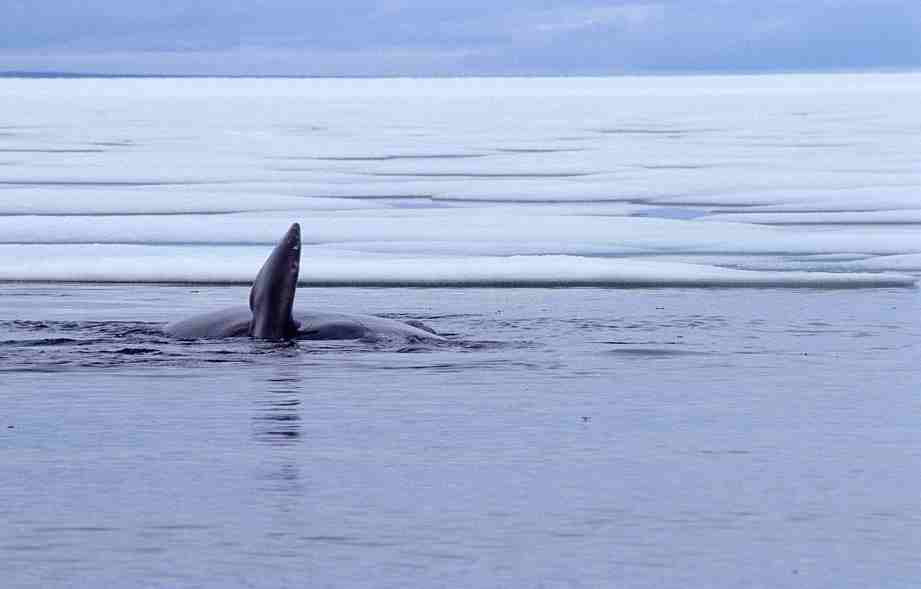
- Bowhead whale, Foxe Basin, 1999

- Location within Nunavut
- Location: Foxe Basin
- Coordinates: 65°25′N 84°50′W
- River sources: Cleveland River
- Ocean/sea sources: Arctic Ocean
- Basin countries: Canada
- Settlements: Uninhabited

Duke of York Bay is an arm of Foxe Basin, in the Qikiqtaaluk Region of Nunavut, Canada. It is located in northeastern Southampton Island. The bay is directly south of the southern end of Qikiqtaaluk (formerly White Island), with Comer Strait at the western entrance and Falcon Strait at the eastern entrance.

== History ==
Sir William Edward Parry and his crew gave the bay its name on 17 August 1821 during his second voyage for the discovery of a Northwest Passage from the Atlantic to the Pacific, in honour of Prince Frederick, Duke of York and Albany, having first entered the bay the day before, 16 August 1821, the Duke's birthday.

In January 1996, Duke of York Bay was selected by delegates from across Nunavut as the site of the first bowhead whale hunt in Nunavut's waters. When the Nunavut Wildlife Management Board switched the location to Naujaat (then called Repulse Bay) the following month, the community of Coral Harbour, south of Duke of York Bay, was angered with the decision. Some thought it was politically motivated, others said that elders felt the ice conditions and strong currents in the bay would make for a difficult beaching.

== Road to Aqiarungna ==
An all weather road running 175 km (109 mi) from Coral Harbour currently under construction since 1999 will link the community and the Bay with the intention of allowing better access to the north end of the island. Construction is expected to complete in 2027.

== See also ==
- Royal eponyms in Canada
