= Thomas Luce =

Thomas or Tom Luce may refer to:

- Thomas Luce (British politician) (1790–1875), British politician
- Captain Thomas Luce (1827–1911), American whaling captain, and founder of Thomas Luce & Company
- Thomas W. Luce, III, founding CEO and former chairman of the board of the National Math and Science Initiative and former Assistant Secretary of the U.S. Department of Education
- Tom Luce, American musician and namesake of the California rock band Luce (band)

== See also ==
- Tom Luse, American film producer
