= George Comer =

American whaler and explorer (1858–1937)

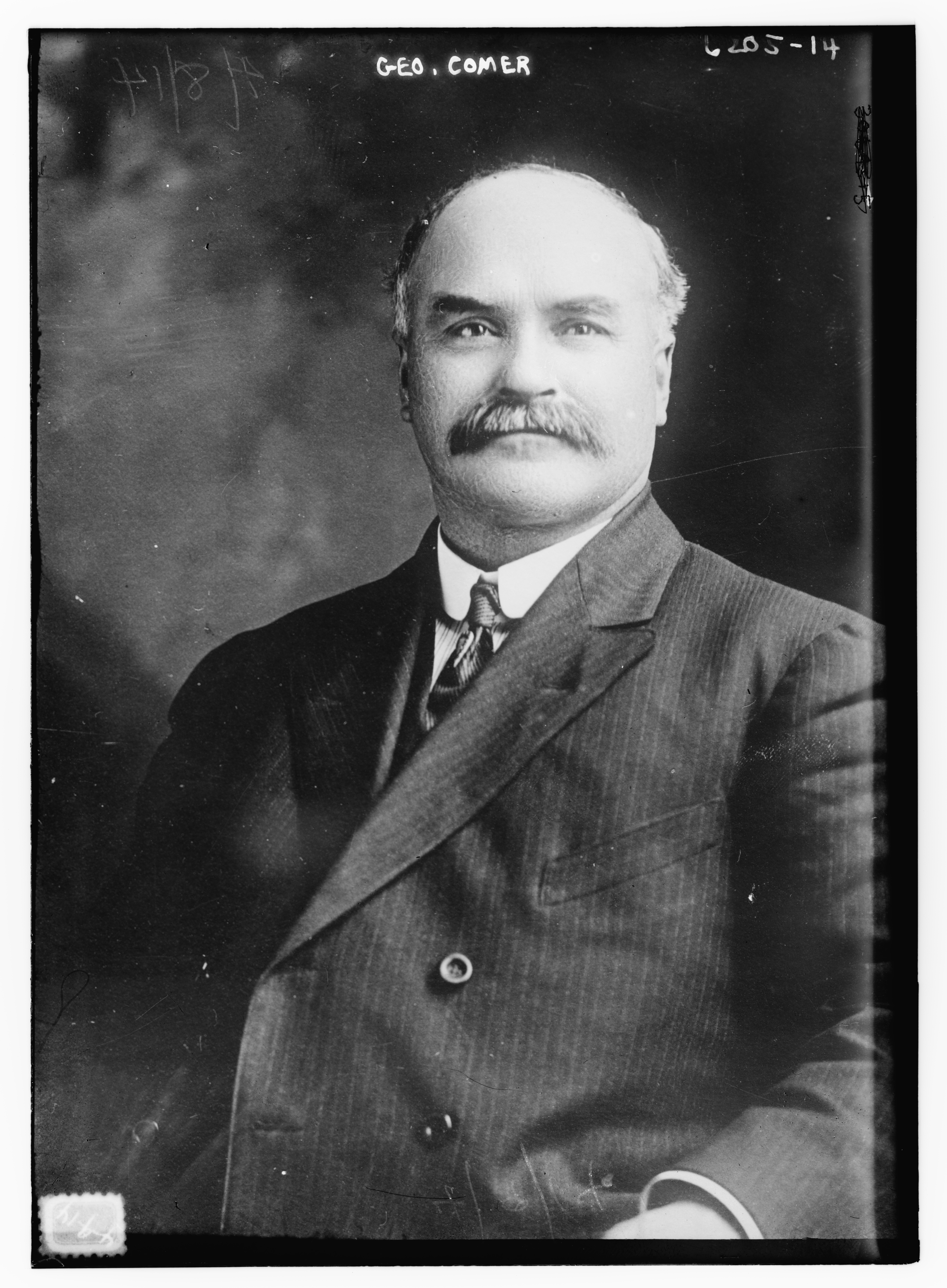
- Capt. George Comer
- Born: April 1858; Quebec City, Canada East
- Died: 1937; East Haddam, Connecticut, USA
- Other names: Angakkuq ("the shaman")
- Occupation: Whaler
- Known for: Polar explorer
- Title: Captain
- Spouse: Julia Chipman Comer
- Children: Nellie, Thomas, Laurent Pameolik, John Ell(?)

Captain George Comer (April 1858 – 1937) was considered the most famous American whaling captain of Hudson Bay, and the world's foremost authority on Hudson Bay Inuit in the early 20th century.

Comer was a polar explorer, whaler/sealer, ethnologist, cartographer, author, and photographer. He made 14 Arctic and three Antarctic voyages in his lifetime. These expeditions (ca. 1875–1919) commonly began in New London, Connecticut or New Bedford, Massachusetts. Comer's circle of friends and colleagues included other notable explorers of the time, such as Robert Peary and Capt. Frederick Cook, and his mentor, Franz Boas, the "Father of American Anthropology".

== Personal life ==
Comer was born in Quebec City, Canada East in 1858. His father was English, and his mother was Irish. The family immigrated to the United States in 1860 and Comer grew up in East Haddam, Connecticut. He attended school for only two years. After Comer's father was lost at sea, his mother couldn't support the children. Subsequently, Comer spent time in an orphanage and an East Haddam foster home. In 1877, Comer (age 19), married Julia Chipman (age 20; born in Pennsylvania) and they made their home on Mount Parnassus Road in East Haddam. They had two children: daughter, Nellie G. (born April 1878), and son, Thomas L. (April 1886 – 1930), a seaship officer.

== Arctic expeditions ==
Comer made the first of his Arctic voyages at age 17 on the whaler Nile bound for Cumberland Sound, Baffin Island in 1875. From 1889 to 1891, he made three cruises on the schooner Era to southeastern Baffin Island. These were followed by 15 months whaling on the Canton during 1893–1894.

After 20 years of seafaring, Comer became captain of his first ship in 1895. From 1895 to 1912, Comer was the master on six whaling cruises to the Hudson Bay, including wintering in Roes Welcome Sound, on the Era (wrecked off Newfoundland in 1906) (Eber, 1989, pp. 25), and the A. T. Gifford.

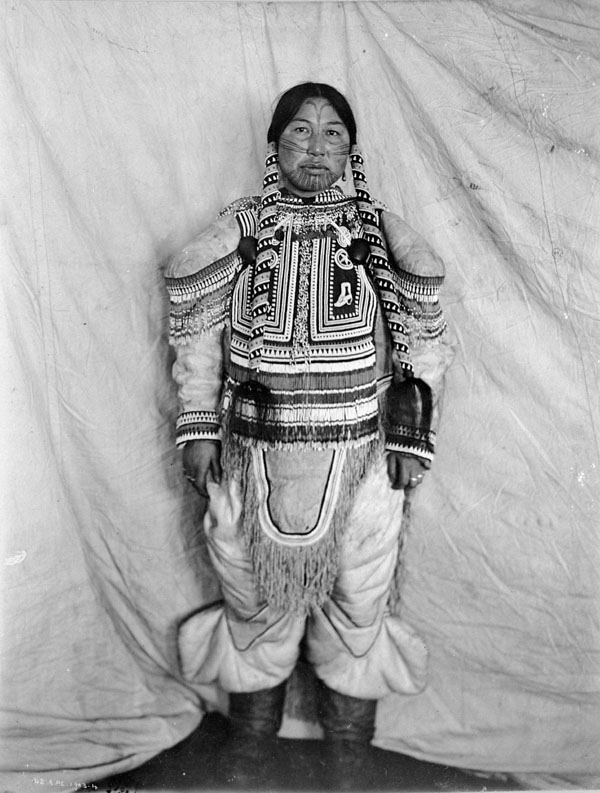
Capt. Comer's Aivillik companion Niviatsinaq (aka "Shoofly"), c. 1903–4 at Cape Fullerton.

While wintering in the Hudson Bay, Comer became acquainted with and concerned for the Aivilingmiut, Netsilingmiut, and Kivallirmiut (also known as Qaernermiut or Caribou Inuit. Comer hired the Caribou Inuit men as whaling hands and they supplied caribou meat for his crew saving them from developing scurvy. The Inuit women made caribou clothing for Comer's men, vital for survival through Arctic winters. Comer photographed the Inuit on many occasions and for that he was given the Inuktitut name "Angakkuq" (meaning, "the shaman"), as the images were not a reality easily understood by the Inuit.

Comer developed a bond with an Aivilik woman named Niviatsianaq (or Nivisanaaq), referred to amongst Inuit as "Shoofly Comer". She was Comer's traveling companion on his ships for several years, bringing her son Oudlanak, referred to as "John Ell", who was rumored to be Comer's biological son, with her. Comer fathered at least one other child while in Hudson Bay with an Inuk woman named Ooktok, Laurent Pameolik (1911–?). Pameolik was adopted by Shoofly and the shaman Angutimarik after the death of his birth mother.

In 1906, New York City furrier F. N. Monjo purchased the Era and hired Capt. Comer as its captain, but Comer wrecked the vessel on the island of Miquelon, off Newfoundland, later that year. Comer then became captain of Monjo's next purchase, the schooner A. T. Gifford, which he commanded from 1907 until 1912. This whaler operated out of New London, Connecticut, for the 1907 voyage and New Bedford, MA, for the 1910 voyage, hunting for whales and furs, and wintering at Cape Fullerton.

His 1907 Anthony Fiala expedition was chartered to establish supply bases in the Arctic in preparation for a second team who would attempt to the reach the North Pole. Comer retired from whaling in 1912.

In 1915, Comer served as ice master on the George B. Cluett, chartered by the American Museum of Natural History to bring back Donald MacMillan's men from the Crocker Land Expedition at Etah, in northern Greenland. En route, the Cluett became ice trapped for two years, giving Comer opportunity to perform archaeological excavations at Mount Dundas (Umánaq, Uummannaq or Umanak), a hill near Pituffik, where he unearthed evidence of what is now referred to as the Thule people, ancestors of the Inuit. His find is called "Comer's Midden" as it included a kitchen-midden.

Comer's last Arctic trip occurred in 1919, in part as a farewell to his Inuit friends. It was a charter by Arctic explorer/ethnologist Christian Leden to study amongst the Inuit. But the schooner, the Finback, grounded at Cape Fullerton and was lost. An investigation was made into the grounding, and the circumstances were found to be suspect. For Comer, the benefit of the accident was the time extension he had with his long-time Inuit friends.

== Antarctic expeditions ==
Comer visited Antarctica on several sealing voyages, including: South Georgia (October 9, 1885 – February 11, 1886) and Kerguelen Island (November 24, 1887 – February 5, 1888).

On his third voyage, he was Second Mate on the American schooner, the Francis Alleyn that sealed at Gough Island (August 22, 1888 – January 23, 1889). Comer is noted as having written the first account of the island's endemic flightless moorhen, the species Gallinula comeri, named after him. Comer wrote of them:

They cannot fly and only use their wings to help them in running ... They are quite plentiful and can be caught by hand. Could not get on a table three feet high. The bushes grow on the island up to about 2,000 feet (610 m), and these birds are found as far up as the bushes grow ... Tip of bill bright yellow, scarlet between the eyes. Legs and feet yellow, with reddish spots.

== Ethnologist and cartographer ==
Comer was highly regarded for his Arctic anthropology, ethnology, natural history, geography, and cartography work. Lacking formal training, Comer was mentored by anthropologist Franz Boas. In return, Comer provided Boas with information that was used by Boas's in his 1888 book, The Central Eskimo.

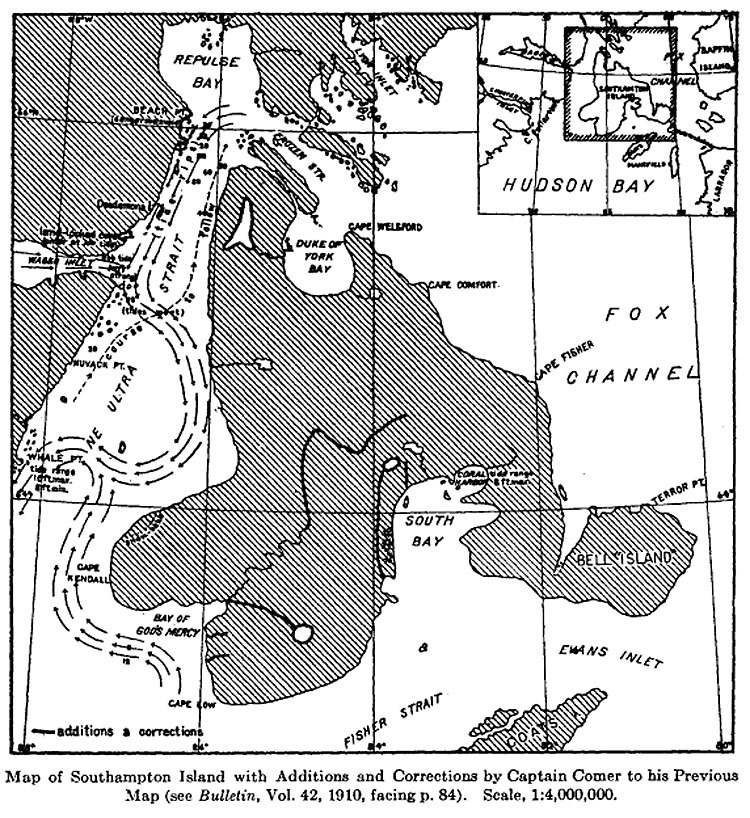
Capt. Comer's 1913 map of Southampton Island.

Comer published papers in 1910 and 1913 in the Bulletin of the American Geographical Society of New York providing improved maps and charts of Southampton Island. In appreciation for his cartography, the government of Canada named the narrow strait around the bend of Roes Welcome Sound that separates northern Southampton Island from White Island "Comer Strait" (65°45′N 85°05′W) in his honor.

Comer also published notes in American Anthropologist (1923) about Southampton Island's isolated Sadlermiut who became extinct in 1902. Subsequent to their extinction, Comer attempted to repopulate Southampton Island at the exceedingly flat Cape Kendall on the island's western shore, northwest of the Bay of Gods Mercy, with Aivilik. Shoofly's only child, Oudlanak ("John Ell"), was the Aivilik group leader. However, within a year, the Aivilik moved to South Bay (an inner cove on the south side of Southampton Island) and they occasionally crossed to Repulse Bay when weather permitted.

In November 1903, Comer recorded Aivilingmiut and Qaernermiut songs on a phonograph while in northwestern Hudson Bay, notable as some of the earliest recorded voices of Inuit. Frozen in the ice at Cape Fullerton during the winters of 1910–1912, he made phonograph records of local Inuit, and preserved Adelaide Peninsula's Iluilirmiut folklore and legends. On board the Era, Comer made plaster casts of their faces. The 300 masks can be found in museums in Germany, Canada, and New York. The Canadian Museum of Civilization bought a large collection of Comer's artifacts in 1913, including a group of animal ivories (fox, musk ox, narwhal, polar bear, wolf), most of which, if not all, were created by "Harry" Ippaktuq Tasseok (or Teseuke), Chief of the Aivilingmiut, and Comer's chief Inuit shipmate while wintering at Cape Fullerton. Commissioned by the American Museum of Natural History, Comer also collected Arctic and Antarctic animal skins, birds, bird's eggs, and geological specimens now at the museum's Comer Collection.

== Later years ==
Comer retired in East Haddam, but he continued to send presents to his Inuit friends. He remained active, serving in the Connecticut State Legislature. He was in ill health in his latter years, and died in East Haddam in 1937 at the age 79.

== Vessels ==
- Green mate, Nile (whaler), 1875
- Mate, Era (whaler), 1889–1892
- Mate, Canton (whaler), 1893–1894
- Master, Era (schooner), 1895–1906
- Master, A. T. Gifford (whaling/sealing schooner of New Bedford), 1907–1912
- Master, George B. Cluett, 1915–1917
- Lt. J. G. George Comer, navigation officer, U.S.S. Radnor (freighter) and U.S.S. Wyska (freighter), 1918–1919
- Lt. George Comer, 2nd officer, U.S.S. Elinor (steamship), 1919
- Master, Finback (auxiliary schooner), 1919
- Master, Blossom (schooner), 1923–1924

== Partial bibliography ==
- "A geographical description of Southampton Island and notes upon the Eskimo". Bulletin of the American Geographical Society. 42. New York. 1910. OCLC 48622589.
- "Additions to Captain Comer's Map of Southampton Island". Bulletin of the American Geographical Society. 45 (7). New York: 516–518. 1913. doi:10.2307/200062. JSTOR 200062.
- "Notes ... on the Natives of the Northwestern Shores of Hudson Bay". American Anthropologist. 23 (2). Menasha, Wisconsin: 243–244. 1923. doi:10.1525/aa.1921.23.2.02a00270. OCLC 70746662.

== Awards and honors ==
- Fellow in the council of the American Geographical Society
- Named in his honor:
  - Comer Strait, off Southampton Island, Nunavut
  - Gallinula comeri, flightless bird on Gough Island
