= Monjo =

Monjo may refer to:

== People ==
- Ferdinand Nicholas Monjo or Nicolas F. Monjo - early 20th-century New York fur traders and owners of the Monjo Company
- Ferdinand Nicholas Monjo III (1924-1978) - popular children's author
- John Cameron Monjo (1931- ) - United States Ambassador to Malaysia (1987-89), Indonesia (1989-92) and Pakistan (1992-95)
- Justin Monjo - American screenwriter

== Places ==
- Monjo - a village in Nepal
