= Christian Leden =

Norwegian explorer, anthropologist, composer and musicologist

- Born: Christian Refsaa; 17 July 1882; Inderøy Municipality, Nordre Trondhjem, Norway
- Died: 19 November 1957 (aged 75)
- Education: Royal Hochschule fur Musik
- Occupations: Ethno-musicologist and composer
- Known for: The first person to record film in the northern Arctic
- Spouse: Liselotte Steinicke

Christian Leden (born Christian Refsaas; 17 July 1882 – 19 November 1957) was a Norwegian ethno-musicologist and composer. He was the first person to record film in the northern Arctic.

== Early years ==
Leden was born in Inderøy Municipality, Nordre Trondhjem county, Norway. In 1901, he trained in Christiania to be a musician. He studied musicology in Berlin, entering the composer class at Royal Hochschule fur Musik in 1904. While in Germany, he changed his surname from Refsaas to Leden. From 1904 through 1909, he was a church organist in Tromsø.

== Career ==
Leden was interested in the early music of Kalaallit (Greenland's Inuit). In the spring of 1909, he received travel funds from the Danish Carlsberg fund to go to northern Greenland to study Inuit music on a voyage with the Danish polar scientist Knud Rasmussen. In the autumn of that year, he returned to Europe and worked on the music he had collected. He traveled in Northern Canada in 1911, West Greenland in 1912, and through the Keewatin Region, Northwest Territories (now Kivalliq Region, Nunavut) in 1913. On his travels to Greenland and Canada, he collected large amounts of music, including approximately 1000 wax roll recordings. He collected large quantities of crafts with special emphasis on Inuit art. He preserved a significant amount of film and photographs from his expeditions, and he learned an Inuit language. During his fifth Arctic trip, a three-year expedition to the Keewatin Region on the west coast of Hudson Bay, he went to several villages collecting everything he could, from art to everyday objects. Leden cataloged his collection with each item's Inuktitut name and English name, as well as its function.

"I preserved many of their songs by means of a phonograph for I found that their intervals were so different from ours that it was almost impossible to retain them. For instance, in the third and sixth intervals, they have a neutral tone that is halfway between our major and minor tones and seems peculiar to their music." (C. Leden, 1922)

In 1919, American whaler George Comer was captain of Leden's chartered voyage to study amongst the Inuit. Their schooner, the Finback, grounded at Cape Fullerton and was lost. Fortunately, everyone survived. The following year, Leden was on another expedition that wrecked on a reef in Hudson Bay. He traveled to East Greenland in 1920 and 1926. In 1949 and 1954, he traveled in South America, including Chile, Argentina, and Easter Island, but the materials he collected during these expeditions were neither edited or published though he recorded thirteen songs on nine wax cylinders. He also worked to preserve Norwegian folk music, traveling the country in 1937-1938 making recordings.

Leden received support from the Geological Survey of Canada who helped him to continue his ethnographic work over several years. His expeditions were sponsored by the King and Queen of Norway, the University of Christiania, and the Danish Carlsberg fond. His work was compiled in the Danish Folklore Archives, and was later transferred to the Royal Danish Library. Some of his recordings are housed at the Musée d'ethnographie de Neuchâtel.

Leden wrote several articles that were published in journals, including "Christmas Among the Eskimos", "Trapping Salmon in the Far North", "A Chapter from my Eskimo Travels", and "Mobilizing the Arctic". The books he wrote, detailing his research, were published in German:

- Uber Kiwatins Eisfelder—Drei Jahre Unter Kanadischen Eskimos ("Across the Keewatin Icefields: Three Years Among the Canadian Eskimos, 1913-1916")
- Über die Musik der Smith Sund Eskimos und ihre Verwandtschaft mit der Musik der Amerikanischen Indianer
- Über die Musik der Ostgrönländer
- Bei den Indianern Kanadas
- Nanuk tauscht seine Frau

When he finished his field work, the analysis and book writing, he traveled around the world, giving a series of lectures about his work.

In the 1930s Leden became involved in Nazi German racial research, meeting with amongst others the leading Nazi racial theorist Hans F. K. Günther in Berlin. Leden joined the racial theorist organization Nordischer Ring c. 1930. He also had contacts with national socialist organizations both in Germany and Norway, including the SS Ahnenerbe think tank. He also worked for the Völkischer Beobachter, and in 1940 joined the foreign branch of the Norwegian national socialist party Nasjonal Samling. His Nazi connections is part of the reason his work is relatively unknown in Norway.

== Personal life ==
Leden lost his autobiography twice. The first time, his pre-written manuscript was taken as evidence during the war because he had lived in Germany and had married a German woman. The second time, in the 1950s, his suitcase was stolen. When he sat down to write his autobiography for the third time, he did not complete it. He married Liselotte Steinicke (born 1904, Danzig, Germany - died 1998, Nesodden, Norway) in 1934 and they made their home in Berlin and Oslo. They had six children. Leden died in 1957.
