= George Fred Tilton =

American whaler & mariner

- Capt. Tilton, 1925, New Bedford, MA
- Born: 1861; Chilmark, Massachusetts, U.S.
- Died: 1932 (aged 70–71)
- Occupations: Mariner, Whaler, Author
- Known for: Arctic whaling
- Spouse: Lucia Irene Look
- Parents: Oliver Tilton (father); Hannah Sisson (mother)

George Fred Tilton (1861–1932) was an American master mariner, whaler, storyteller, and author who went on his first whaling trip at age 14.

== Whaling career ==
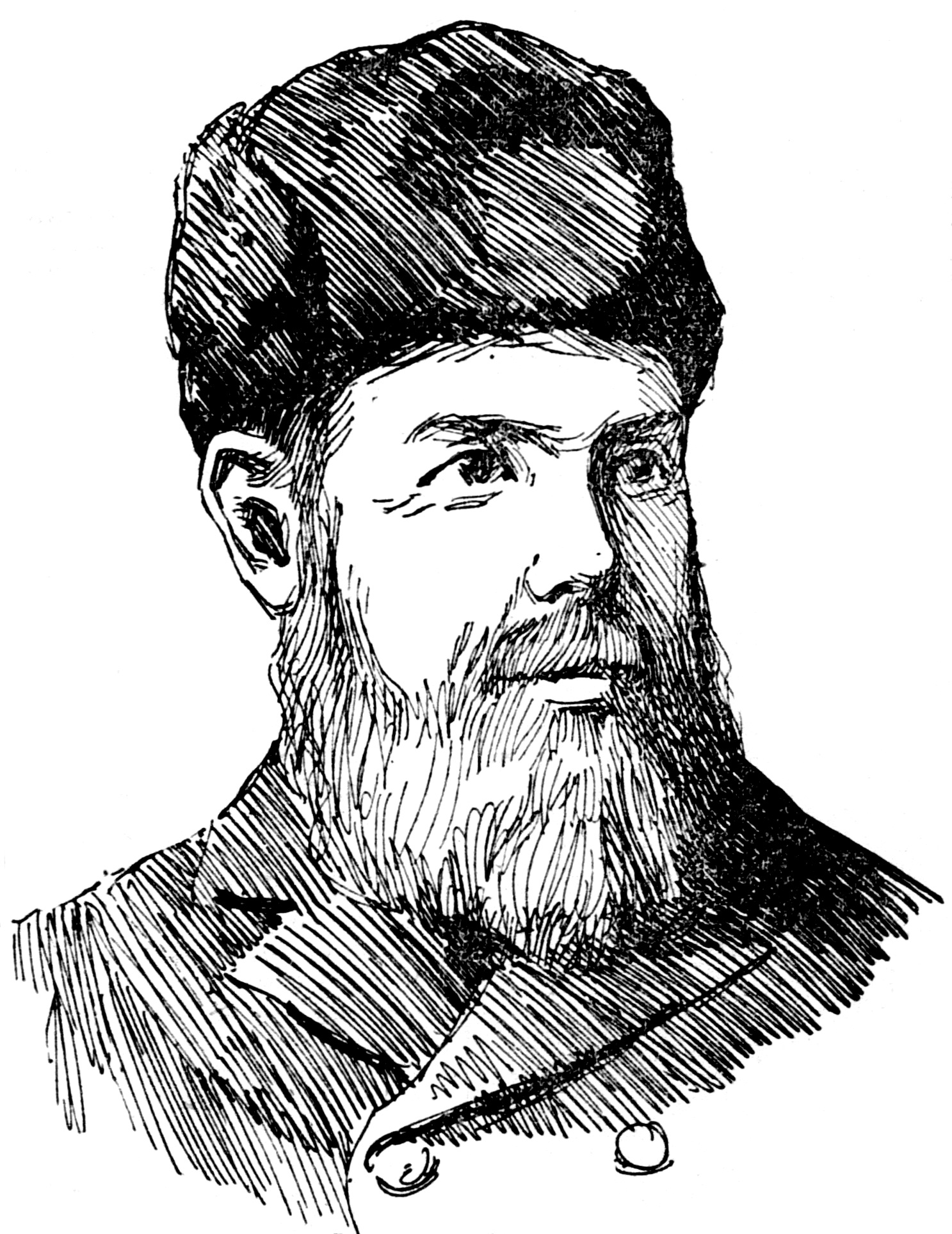

Tilton was born in Chilmark, Massachusetts to George Oliver Tilton and Hannah Sisson. He ran away from home at age 14, stowing himself aboard a New Bedford whaling schooner. By the time that he was discovered, the ship was too far from shore and the captain allowed him to stay.

Tilton became a highly accomplished whaler, spending more than forty years at sea hunting whales from the equator to the arctic. In 1898, he was part of a whaling fleet that got caught in an ice pack off Point Barrow, and the fleet decided to send someone to get help out of fear of starvation and death. Tilton filled his pockets with crackers and set out to walk the 3,000 miles to help declaring, "if any one can make the trip, I can." He later wrote:

Any Arctic whaleman will tell you that when a man goes into the Arctic he is a total stranger to conditions every year. In thirty-two years that I spent in the Arctic, I have never seen two summers alike as regards to ice.

== Post-whaling life ==
Tilton served four years in the U.S. Navy during World War I. In 1917, he was hired by the Monjo Company to investigate the disappearance of the A. T. Gifford in Hudson Bay. He sailed on the schooner Pythian, investigated the accident, and determined that fire was the cause of the sinking.

In 1925, Tilton was hired to supervise the overhaul of Charles W. Morgan and to serve as her "captain" when she was opened to the public. The ship was repaired in a sand berth at the Round Hill (Dartmouth, Massachusetts) estate of Edward Howland Robinson Green. In 1926, the Morgan opened to the public and had nearly two hundred thousand visitors. Tilton writes in his autobiography Cap’n George Fred Himself (1928): "perhaps we two, the ship and myself, compare pretty favorable ... now that we are not wanted to hunt whales anymore, we are laid up here so that people can get some idea of how the business used to be done. The ship is on exhibition, and I sometimes think I am too."

Tilton died in 1932 at age 71, and The New York Times published his obituary.
