= A. T. Gifford =

American schooner-rigged whaleship

History

United States
- Name: A. T. Gifford
- Owner: George Dennis, 1884-1900; F. N. Monjo, 1913-1915
- Laid down: March 1883
- Homeport: Gloucester, Massachusetts
- Fate: Lost, 1915

General characteristics
- Type: Schooner-rigged whaler
- Displacement: 82 short tons (74 t)
- Length: 82 ft 6 in (25.15 m)

The A. T. Gifford was the last American schooner-rigged whaleship to cruise Hudson Bay. She caught fire and sank in late 1915. Although the captain and a few of his crew escaped the wreck, none survived the disaster.

== Construction and ownership ==
A. T. Gifford was a sailing ship built in March 1883 in Essex, Massachusetts. Rigged as a schooner, she measured 82.6 feet (25.2 m) in length, and displaced 82 short tons (73 long tons; 74 t).

From 1884 until after 1900, George Dennis owned A. T. Gifford, and her home port was Gloucester, Massachusetts. From 1913 to 1915, furrier F. N. Monjo of New York City owned A. T. Gifford.

== Commanding officers ==
=== Edward M. Joyce ===
E. M. Joyce – presumably Edward M. Joyce, who had previously commanded the schooners Eliza K. Parker in 1881 and Henry L. Phillips 1883 – commanded A. T. Gifford from 1884 until at least 1900.

=== George Comer ===
George Comer served as captain of the Gifford on two voyages out of Stamford, Connecticut in 1907 and 1910. Comer had obtained command of the Gifford after his previous whaleship Era was wrecked off Newfoundland in 1906.

Comer spent two winters, 1910–1912, frozen in the ice at Cape Fullerton, during which time he made phonograph records of the local Inuit, and collected folklore and legends of the Iluilirmiut of Adelaide Peninsula (Iluilik), Hudson Bay. The vessel also took five small whales which yielded 2,000 pounds (910 kg) of whalebone, then valued at $10,000.

=== James Allen Wing ===
62-year-old James Allen Wing (1851–1925) was the next captain of the A. T. Gifford. Wing had recently left his post as master of the steam bark Gay Head of San Francisco, and was well-acquainted with arctic navigation. The son of whaling captain Andrew Wing of Acushnet, Massachusetts, he had sailed on whaleships since the age of eleven, before moving in the early 1890s from New Bedford to California to follow the profits of the whaling trade. In California he became master of the bark Sea Breeze, the steamer Karluk, and the C. T. Walker, plying the western Arctic waters for whales, and was part of the "ice catch" of 1898 in which eight whalers were trapped in the ice off the coast of Alaska. After two seasons on river steamers between Stockton and San Francisco, he became captain of the Gay Head, a post he held from 1909 to 1912.

His voyage on the Gifford left in June 1913. During its cruise in Hudson Bay, Capt. Wing dropped off Capt. George Cleveland of Martha's Vineyard, his partner Mr. Bumpus, and their supplies at Cape Fullerton to establish a trading post for the F. N. Monjo Company of furriers.

=== Arthur O. Gibbons ===
Arthur O. Gibbons (1859–1915) of Norwich, Connecticut was the last captain of the A. T. Gifford. He was unmarried, the son of Mrs. Mary A. (Gibbons) Murray of Norwich. He is presumably the same Arthur O. Gibbons who is listed as the master of the Francis Allyn (1897, 1899), the Ellen A. Swift (1902, 1906), and Charles W. Morgan (1908). He is probably the same man as Arthur B. Gibbons who captained the Sarah W. Hunt in 1892 and 1893, and perhaps the Margaret, the Bertha (1902, 1911), and the T. Towner.

== Fire and sinking ==
In July, 1915, the Gifford left Provincetown, MA on her final voyage. After dropping off supplies and picking up a two years' catch of furs from Captain Cleveland at Cape Fullerton in September 1915, she was never heard from again.

In 1917, George Fred Tilton of Martha's Vineyard was hired by the Monjo company to investigate the disappearance of the schooner. He sailed to Hudson Bay on the schooner Pythian and determined that it had burned and sank in flames on its homeward journey. Tilton wrote, "I found proof that the schooner had caught fire and burned until her gas tanks blew up and sunk her, and I learned from the natives of three men who landed in a small boat and died from burns and exposure."

An overturned fisherman's dory covering two skeletons were found by Capt. Cleveland at Coats Island in 1921, alleged to be the remains of crew of the schooner A. T. Gifford. One of the two bodies was identified as Captain Gibbons by his small stature and his revolver. The second skeleton remained unidentified, but was presumed to be one of the Gifford's officers. The men were thought to have been trying to reach the nearest Hudson Bay trading post, some 70 miles (110 km) from where the dory was found, when winter storms set in. The Canadian Government held a criminal investigation.

No other survivors of the wreck have ever been located. All 15 lives on board were deemed lost.
