= New Bedford Meeting House =

- New Bedford Friends Meeting
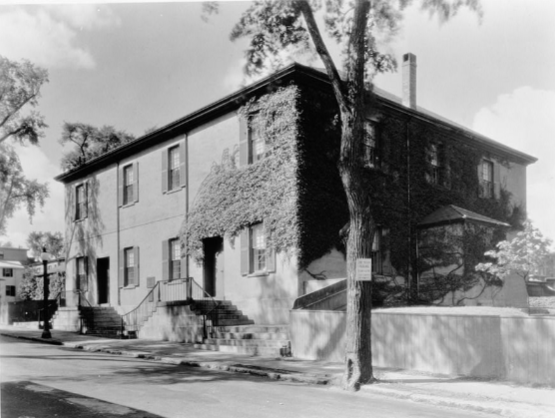

- New Bedford Meeting House
- 41°38′0.6″N 70°55′41.3″W
- Location: 83 Spring Street, New Bedford, Massachusetts
- Country: United States
- Denomination: Society of Friends (Quakers)

History
- Founded: 1785

Architecture
- Years built: 1785 (original); 1822 (rebuilt)

Administration
- Division: Friends General Conference
- District: Sandwich Quarter

New Bedford Friends Meeting House, also known as New Bedford Friends Meeting, is a Quaker house of worship in New Bedford, Massachusetts. Since 1822, this meeting house has been the home to the New Bedford Meeting of the Religious Society of Friends (Quakers); the meeting meets every Sunday at 10:00 a.m.

== Background ==
Quakers settled in Dartmouth near Buzzards Bay in the seventeenth century, and were among the first colonial settlers in the area. Prior to their respective incorporations, Dartmouth was a larger area that additionally encompassed Acushnet, Fairhaven, New Bedford, and Westport; this historical region is now referred to as Old Dartmouth. Quakers settled where the farmland was most fertile, without establishing a town center. The Apponegansett Meeting House was established in 1699 and expanded three times by 1743. As the membership grew, additional meeting houses were established in Westport and at Allen's Neck.

Due to the prevalence of Quakers living in Dartmouth, it had become a place of religious acceptance, based on the preachings of George Fox. Some of their neighbors were Baptists, who believed in religious freedom. The town of New Bedford became a sanctuary for fugitive slaves, aided by the Quakers. The town became a major Underground Railroad station, due to the Quakers' belief in equality. In 1834, a branch of the Anti-Slavery Society was founded in New Bedford.

Some Quakers in the Dartmouth, New Bedford, and Nantucket area engaged in the whaling industry. Residents such as Charles Waln Morgan, George Howland Sr., and several members of the prominent Rotch and Russell families owned and captained whaling ships. Other industries that relied upon or supported the whaling industry were established, such as a candleworks that made candles out of whale oil. Some of the Quakers from New Bedford were businessmen.

== History ==
The first iteration of the Friends Meeting House was built in 1785, on land donated by Joseph Russell III in that same year. It was the first building constructed for religious purposes in what was then Bedford Village. (Note: This source mistakenly attributes the land donation as coming from Joseph Rotch (rather than Russell), who by all accounts died the year before in 1784; the other provided sources all attribute the donation to Joseph Russell. Both the Rotch and Russell families were highly influential in the founding of New Bedford, and were prominent Quakers, merchants, and whalers. Joseph Rotch had purchases 10 acres of land from Joseph Russell in 1765.) The meeting house was rebuilt in 1822 on top of the original construction, and is the current standing iteration of the building. It is a brick building with no decorations and separate entrances for men and women, an external reflection of the Quakers' strict beliefs in simple living.

In his 1845 autobiography Narrative of the Life of Frederick Douglass, Frederick Douglass mentions two men who were members of New Bedford Monthly Meeting—William C. Taber and Joseph Ricketson—because of their assistance in helping Douglass and his wife get to New Bedford from Newport, Rhode Island when he was escaping enslavement. "They seemed at once to understand our circumstances, and gave us such assurance of their friendliness as put us fully at ease in their presence. It was good indeed to meet with such friends, at such a time," Douglass wrote of Taber and Ricketson. William C. Taber led Quaker congregation's business meetings of New Bedford Monthly Meeting from 1835 until early 1852. He was also the meeting's treasurer from 1831 through 1848.

== Members ==
New Bedford Meeting's members have included Captain John Howland Jr., who partnered with his brother James, in the firm J. and J. Howland. George Howland Jr., who also lived on Sixth Street, was a businessman and the fifth mayor of New Bedford. He was the son of Ann Howland Dunbar, the daughter of John Howland Jr., and Elisha Dunbar, a successful whaling merchant. George Howland Sr., married to Susan, was one of the very wealthy whaling merchants. Of his ships, one of them was named the George and Susan, which was launched on their wedding day in 1811. Frederick Douglass said of his former employers, George Howland Sr. was "a hard driver, but a good paymaster, and I got on well with him."

Susan Howland and Rachel Howland were Quaker ministers who were members of New Bedford Meeting in the nineteenth century.

The Grinnell family, which includes bankers Cornelius Grinnell and his son Joseph Grinnell, were early settlers in New Bedford.

Hetty Green, known as "The richest woman in America" during the Gilded Age, grew up in New Bedford Meeting.

Abolitionists Nathan and Polly Johnson, who lived next door to the older New Bedford Friends Meetinghouse, which is kitty cornered across an intersection from the current New Bedford Meetinghouse, hosted Frederick Douglass in 1838. Abolition Row Park, containing a statue of Frederick Douglass, is across the street from the New Bedford meetinghouse.
