= J. & W. R. Wing Company =

Defunct American whaling company

- House flag

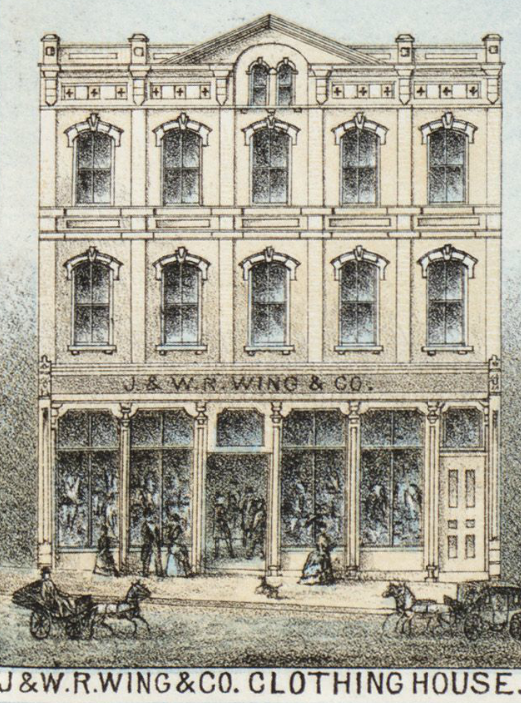
- Engraving of a store-front building titled J. & W. R. Wing & Co. clothing house
- Founded: 1849
- Defunct: 1914
- Headquarters: New Bedford, Massachusetts

The Joseph & William R. Wing Company was the largest whaling firm in the United States. Based in New Bedford, Massachusetts during the late 19th and early 20th centuries, the J. & W. R. Wing Co. was the agent for 236 whaling voyages from 1852 until 1914 and was among the last whaling companies operating in the United States.

== The Wing brothers ==
Brothers Joseph Wing (born 1810) and William Ricketson Wing (1830–1908) were born on a farm at Russells Mills near South Dartmouth, southwest of New Bedford. They opened as partners in a dry goods business in a New Bedford in 1849, providing clothing for mariners embarking and returning on New Bedford whaling voyages. The Wings began to invest in whaleships in 1849, and in 1852 they became the owners and agents of their first vessel.

== Profits ==
The Wings made their fortunes primarily from outfitting seamen, and to a lesser extent from the production and sale of the whale oil and whalebone. Typically, they would indebt a recruited sailor for the cost of their clothing and supplies, the cost for boarding them before the ship departed, and then charge substantial interest on these loans.

== The Wing Co. fleet ==
The Wings increased their fleet during the Civil War, and by 1866 were managing 16 vessels. By 1870, they controlled the largest fleet of whaleships in the United States. Among their possessions was the Charles W. Morgan, today moored at Mystic Seaport in Mystic, Connecticut.

== W. R. Wing's fatal accident ==
In 1908, 78-year-old William R. Wing and his ten-year-old grandson were killed when the horse-drawn buggy they were driving was struck by a train. The last whaling voyage by the J. & W. R. Wing Co. was in 1914, the voyage of the bark Andrew Hicks under Capt. Charles A. Chace.
