= Comer Strait =

Waterway in Nunavut

Coordinates: 65°45′00″N 085°04′59″W

Comer Strait is a narrow waterway separating the northeastern tip of Southampton Island from the western shore of White Island in Nunavut's Foxe Basin. It is also the western entrance to the Duke of York Bay.

Comer Strait was named for American whaling captain George Comer.
