= Cape Fullerton =

Cape and peninsula in Nunavut, Canada

Cape Fullerton Qatiktalik (Inuktitut)
- Cape
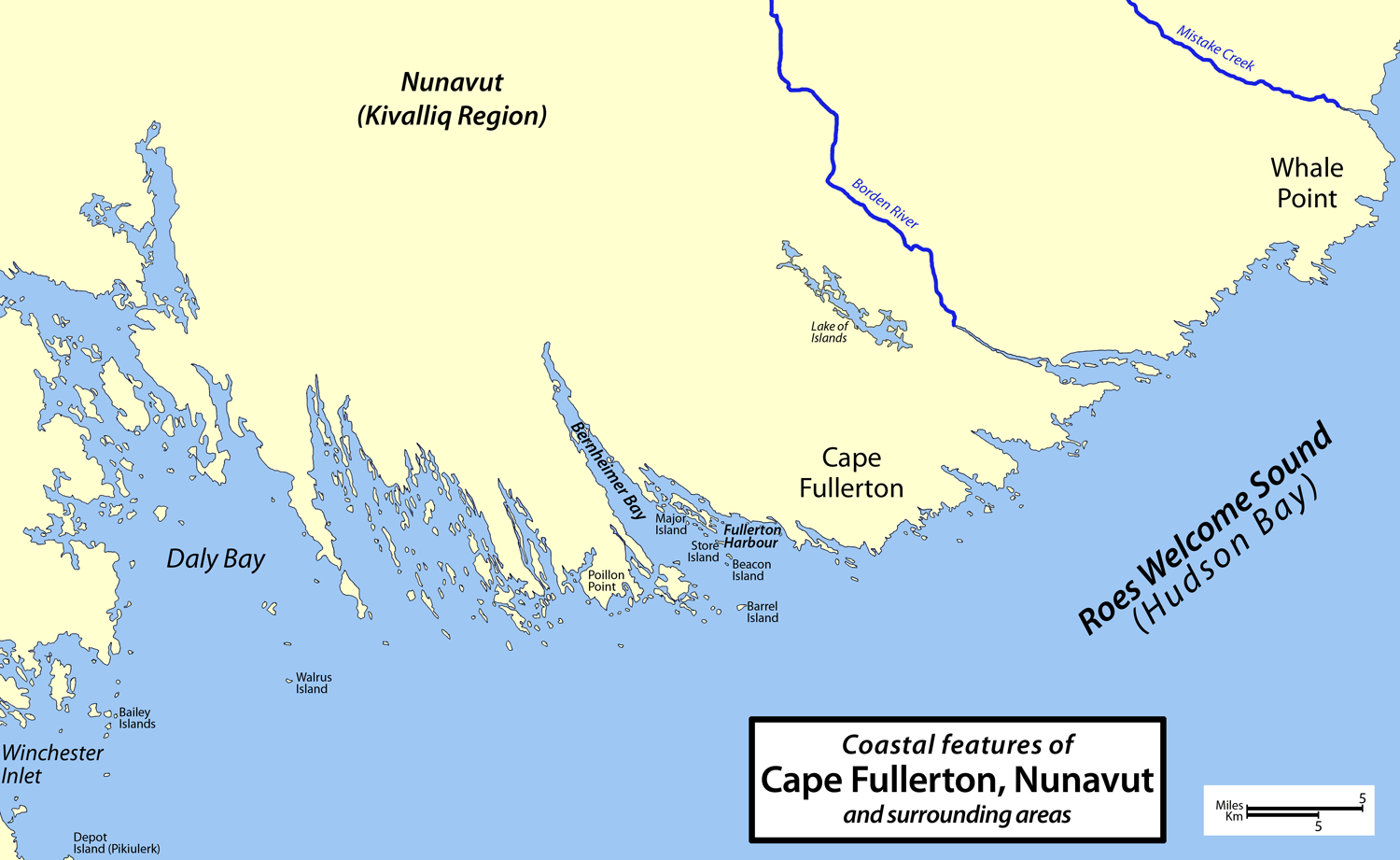
- Cape Fullerton, Nunavut, Canada

- Coordinates: 63°59′07″N 88°45′28″W
- Location: Ukkusiksalik National Park, Nunavut, Canada
- Offshore water bodies: Roes Welcome Sound, Hudson Bay
- Topo map: NTS 55P15 Cape Fullerton

Cape Fullerton (Inuktitut: ᖃᑎᒃᑕᓕᒃ, romanized: Qatiktalik) is a cape and peninsula in the Kivalliq Region of Nunavut, Canada, located on the northwest shores of Hudson Bay on Roes Welcome Sound and includes Fullerton Harbour. Today it is part of Ukkusiksalik National Park.

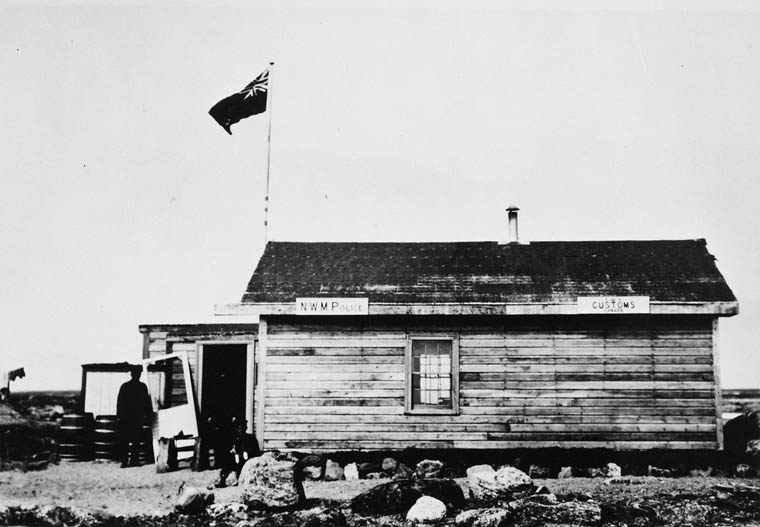
Barracks at Cape Fullerton, Nunavut, Canada, 1904. Photo by J. D. Moodie. The original notes with this photograph added "Officers' Quarters only built at that time and occupied by Detachment, 1904."

Although Cape Fullerton was traditionally home to migrant Inuit, including the Aivilingmiut and the Kivallirmiut (Caribou Inuit), today the nearest permanently populated settlement is Chesterfield Inlet, roughly 100 km (62 mi) to the southwest.

In the early 1900s, Fullerton Harbour was a popular wintering station for American and Scottish whaling ships and a trading point between Inuit and southern whalers. In September 1903, the first North-West Mounted Police outpost was established at Cape Fullerton both to establish Canadian sovereignty as well as to administer whaling licenses, collect customs, control liquor, and maintain order. The NWMP closed about 1914.

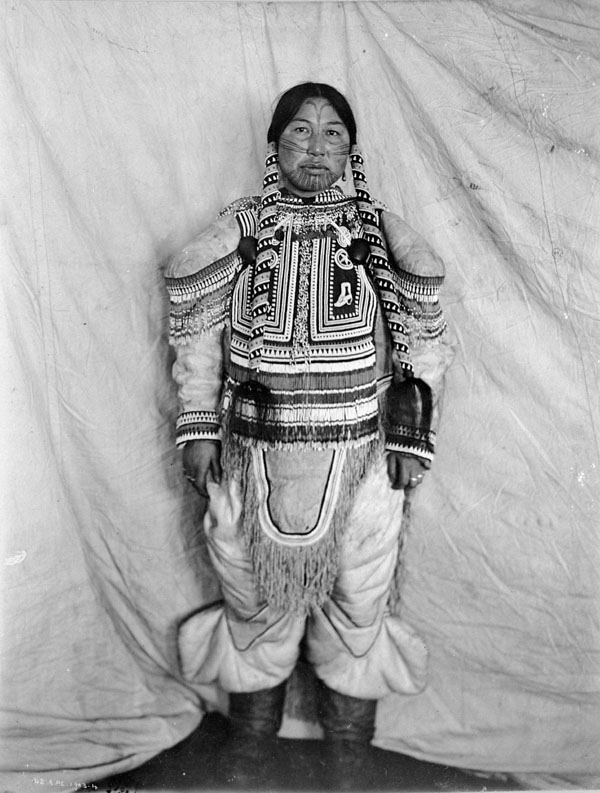
Aivilingmiut woman Niviatsinaq ("Shoofly Comer"), wife of George Comer, at Cape Fullerton, circa 1903-1904

George Comer served as captain of the A. T. Gifford on two voyages out of Stamford, Connecticut in 1907 and 1910. Comer had obtained command of the Gifford after his previous whaleship Era was wrecked off Newfoundland in 1906.

Comer spent two winters, 1910–1912, frozen in the ice at Cape Fullerton, during which time he made phonograph records of the local Inuit, and collected folklore and legends of the Iluilirmiut of Adelaide Peninsula (Iluilik), Hudson Bay. The vessel also took five small whales which yielded 910 kg (2,000 lb) of baleen, then valued at $10,000.

From 1915 until 1919, Captain George Cleveland (1871–1925) ran a trading post at Fullerton Harbour, under the employ of furrier F. N. Monjo of New York City. In 1919, the Hudson's Bay Company obtained the post and Cleveland moved it to Repulse Bay (now Naujaat). It was also in 1919 that Captain George Comer grounded his schooner, the Finback, at Cape Fullerton; it was to be his last Arctic voyage.

In 1924, an old carpenter's shop and an outbuilding were dismantled from the remains of Cape Fullerton Outpost and the lumber shipped to Chesterfield Inlet.

In the winter of 1940–41, "the disused Police barracks at Fullerton Harbour" were still being used for refuge for travellers.
