= Charles W. Morgan (ship) =

American whaling ship built in 1841

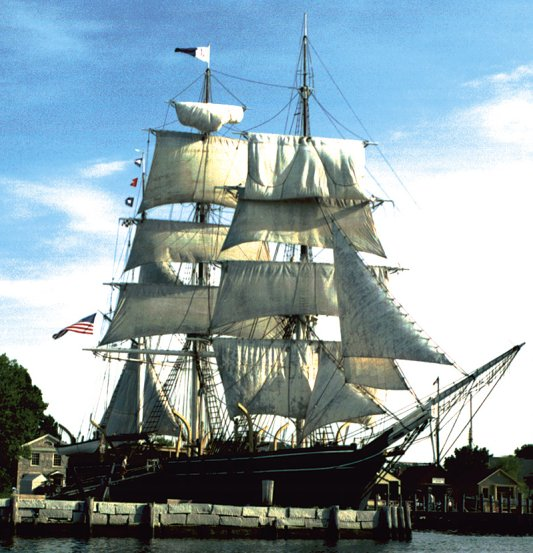
- Charles W. Morgan at Mystic Seaport, Connecticut

History

United States
- Owner: Charles Waln Morgan, 1841–; J. & W. R. Wing Company, c.1863 – c.1912; Col. E H R Green, c.1925–1941; Whaling Enshrined, Inc., 1941; Mystic Seaport, 1941–
- Builder: Jethro and Zachariah Hillman, New Bedford, Massachusetts
- Launched: 1841
- Identification: MMSI number: 367608930; Call sign: WDH3594
- Status: Museum ship

General characteristics
- Tonnage: 351.3 (Old Tons); 313.8 (New Tons)
- Length: 113 ft (34 m) LOA
- Beam: 27 ft 6 in (8.38 m)
- Depth: 17.1 feet (5.2 m)
- Sail plan: Double-topsail bark rig; 13,000 sq ft (1,200 m^{2}) of sail
- Charles W. Morgan
- U.S. National Register of Historic Places
- U.S. National Historic Landmark
- U.S. Historic district – Contributing property
- Location within Connecticut Location within the United States
- Location: Mystic, Connecticut
- Coordinates: 41.36222°N 71.96518°W
- Built: 1841
- Part of: Mystic Bridge Historic District (ID79002671)
- NRHP reference No.: 66000804

Significant dates
- Added to NRHP: 13 November 1966
- Designated NHL: 13 November 1966
- Designated CP: August 31, 1979

Charles W. Morgan is an American whaling ship built in 1841 that was active during the 19th and early 20th centuries. Ships of this type were used to harvest the blubber of whales for whale oil which was commonly used in lamps. Charles W. Morgan has served as a museum ship since the 1940s, and is an exhibit at the Mystic Seaport museum in Mystic, Connecticut. She is the world's oldest surviving merchant vessel, the only surviving wooden whaling ship from the 19th century American merchant fleet (of an estimated 2,700 built), and the second-oldest seaworthy vessel in the world after USS Constitution. Charles W. Morgan was designated a National Historic Landmark in 1966.

== Construction ==
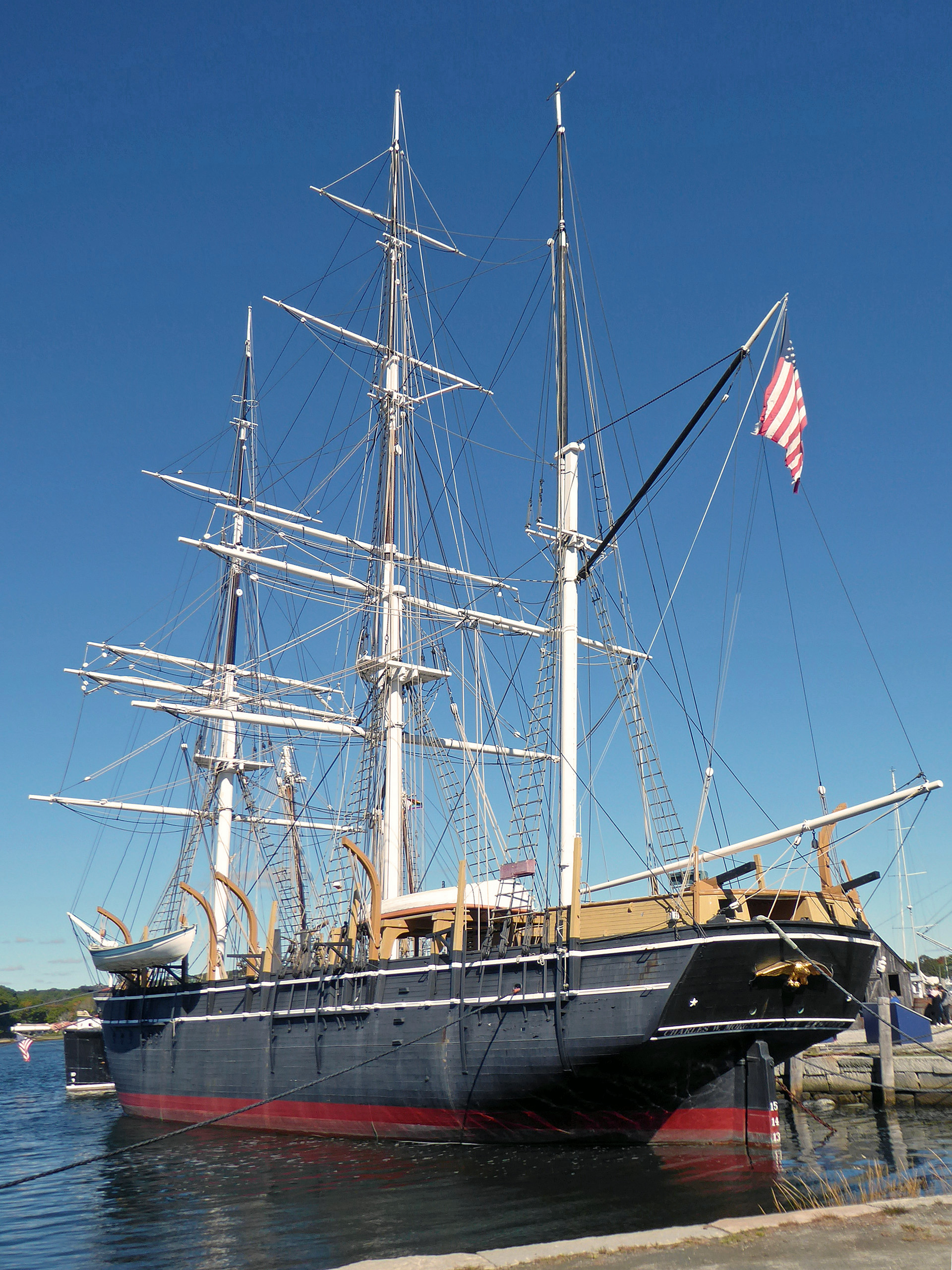
Charles W. Morgan 2022 in Mystic

Charles W. Morgan (often referred to simply as "the Morgan") was a whaling ship named for owner Charles Waln Morgan (1796–1861). He was a Philadelphian by birth who moved to New Bedford, Massachusetts in 1818 and invested in several whalers over his career. He chose Jethro and Zachariah Hillman's shipyard in New Bedford to construct a new ship. The Morgan's live oak keel was laid down in February 1841 and fastened together with copper bolts. The bow and stern pieces of live oak were secured to the keel by an apron piece. The sturdy stern post was strengthened with hemlock root and white oak. Yellow pine shipped from North Carolina was used for the ship's beams, and hemlock or hackmatack was used for the hanging knees.

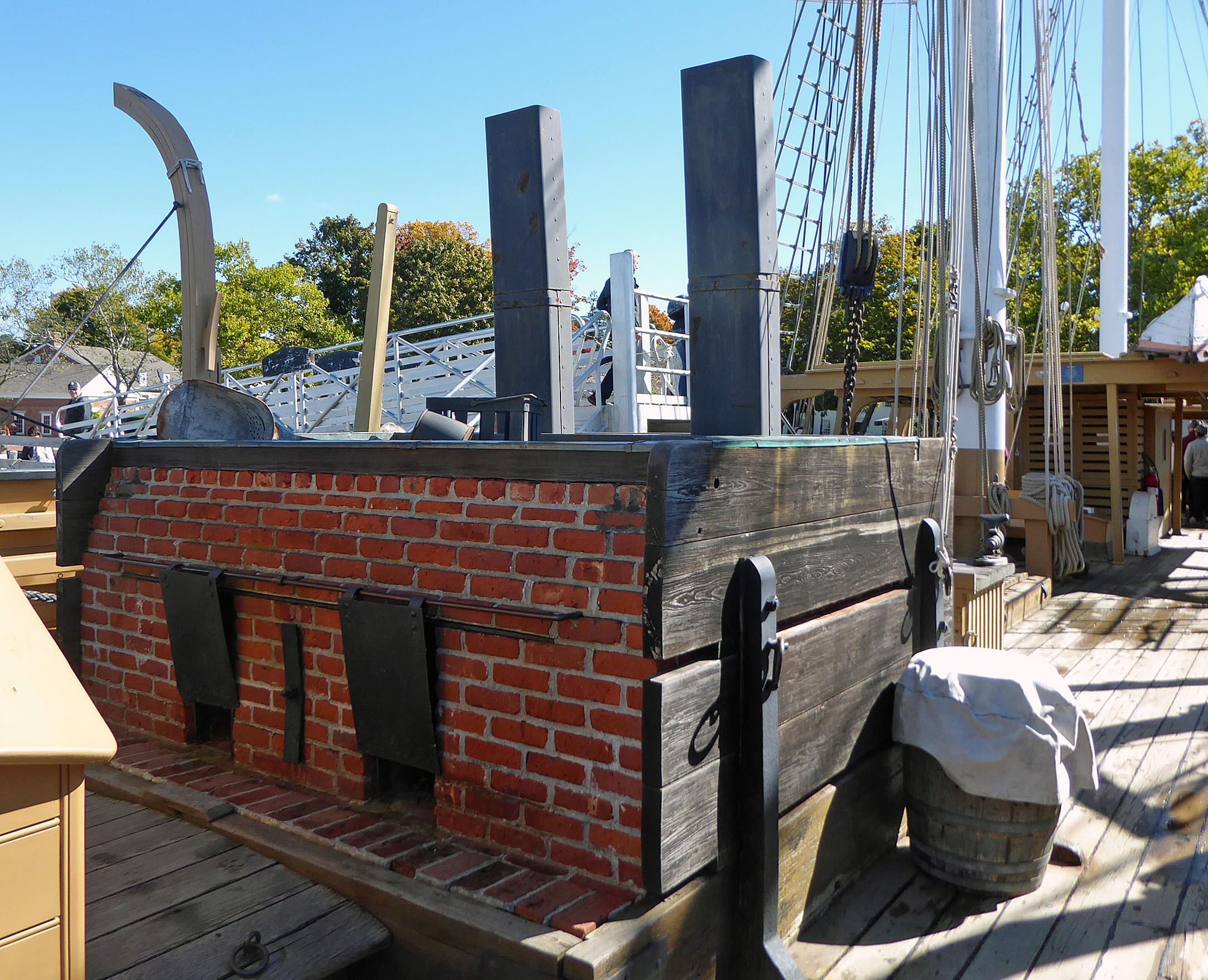
Try-works oven on deck

Construction continued until April 19, 1841, when the workers went on strike, demanding a ten-hour work day. The strike gathered support until it encompassed the shipyard, the oil refineries, and the cooper shops. Morgan was appointed chairman of the employers and given the task of resolving it. He opposed their demands, and a meeting with four master mechanics ended in failure. An agreement was reached on May 6 when the workers accepted a 10½ hour workday. Work resumed on the ship without incident and she was launched on July 21, 1841. Morgan was registered as 106 1/2 feet (32.5 m) in length, 27 feet 2 1/2 inches (8.293 m) inches in breadth, and 13 feet 7 1/4 inches (4.147 m) in depth. She measured 314 gross register tons.

Charles W. Morgan was outfitted at Rotch's Wharf for the next two months while preparations were made for her first voyage. Captain Thomas Norton sailed her into the Atlantic alongside Adeline Gibbs and Nassau towards the Azores. They stopped at Porto Pim (Horta, Azores) on Faial Island to gather supplies before crossing the Atlantic. The ship passed Cape Horn, then charted a course to the north. On December 13, the men launched in their whaleboats and took their first whale. The Morgan entered the port of Callao in early February and departed again on the 10th for the Galapagos Islands. In 1844, the ship sailed to the Kodiak Grounds before sailing for home on August 18. She returned to her home port in New Bedford on January 2, 1845. The voyage of three years and three months resulted in 59 whales being processed for 1,600 barrels of sperm oil, 800 barrels of right whale oil, and five tons of whale bone.

== Service life ==
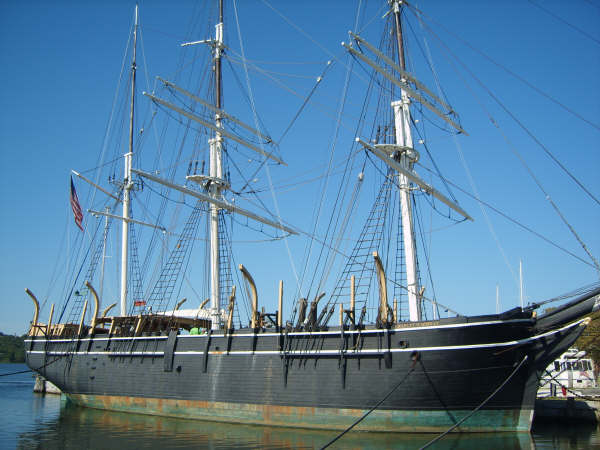

Charles W. Morgan made most of her 37 voyages in her 80 years of service from her home port of New Bedford, Massachusetts, ranging in duration from nine months to five years. She brought home a total of 54,483 barrels of sperm and whale oil and 152,934 pounds of whalebone. She sailed in the Indian and South Atlantic Oceans, surviving ice and snow storms. She was based in San Francisco between 1888 and 1904.

The Morgan had more than 1,000 whalemen of all races and nationalities in her lifetime. Her crew included sailors from Cape Verde, New Zealand, the Seychelles, Guadeloupe, and Norfolk Island. The ship's crew averaged around 33 men per voyage. The ship was often home to the captain's family, as was common among whaling ships. She was owned and managed by the J. & W. R. Wing Company of New Bedford.

Experts have calculated the lifetime financial returns from Charles W. Morgan at over $1.4 Million.

Charles W. Morgan was used in several movies, including Miss Petticoats (1916), Down to the Sea in Ships (1922), and Java Head (1923).

== Voyage summary ==
Voyage	Port	Captain	Departure	Arrival	Mainly operated in
1	New Bedford	Thomas A. Norton	September 6, 1841	January 2, 1845	Pacific
2	New Bedford	J.D. Samson	June 10, 1845	December 9, 1848	Pacific
3	New Bedford	J.D. Samson	June 5, 1849	May 27, 1853	Pacific
4	New Bedford	Tristram P. Ripley	September 20, 1853	April 27, 1856	North Pacific
5	New Bedford	Thomas N. Fisher	September 15, 1856	April 16, 1859	North Pacific
6	New Bedford	James. A. Hamilton	October 4, 1859	May 12, 1863	North Pacific
7	New Bedford	Thomas C. Landers	December 1, 1863	June 12, 1867	North Pacific
8	New Bedford	George Athearn	July 17, 1867	August 16, 1871	Pacific
9	New Bedford	John M. Tinkham	September 26, 1871	October 31, 1874	Indian
10	New Bedford	John M. Tinkham	April 23, 1875	May 17, 1878	Atlantic
11	New Bedford	Thomas L. Ellis	July 17, 1878	May 11, 1881	Atlantic
12	New Bedford	Charles F. Keith	July 13, 1881	Jun 17, 1886	Pacific
13	New Bedford	George A. Smith	October 6, 1886	November 4, 1887	North Pacific
14	San Francisco	George A. Smith	December 3, 1887	November 5, 1888	North Pacific
15	San Francisco	John S. Layton	November 26, 1888	October 27, 1889	North Pacific
16	San Francisco	John S. Layton	December 5, 1889	November 8, 1890	Japan and Okhotsk
17	San Francisco	J. A. M. Earle	December 2, 1890	October 31, 1891	Japan and Okhotsk
18	San Francisco	J. A. M. Earle	November 24, 1891	November 7, 1892	Japan and Okhotsk
19	San Francisco	J. A. M. Earle	December 8, 1892	November 9, 1893	Japan and Okhotsk
20	San Francisco	J. A. M. Earle	December 6, 1893	November 5, 1895	Japan and Okhotsk
21	San Francisco	J. A. M. Earle	December 2, 1895	November 1, 1896	Pacific
22	San Francisco	John S. Layton	December 3, 1896	October 25, 1897	Pacific
23	San Francisco	Thomas Scullion	November 11, 1897	October 28, 1898	Japan and Okhotsk
24	San Francisco	Thomas Scullion	November 26, 1898	November 2, 1899	Japan and Okhotsk
25	San Francisco	Thomas Scullion	December 7, 1899	October 29, 1900	Japan and Okhotsk
26	San Francisco	J. A. M. Earle	November 22, 1900	October 29, 1901	Japan and Okhotsk
27	San Francisco	Thomas Scullion	November 27, 1901	October 28, 1902	Japan and Okhotsk
28	San Francisco	J. A. M. Earle	November 20, 1902	October 27, 1903	Japan and Okhotsk
29	San Francisco	J. A. M. Earle	November 18, 1903	October 31, 1904	Japan and Okhotsk
30	San Francisco	Edwin J. Reed	November 25, 1904	June 12, 1906	South Pacific
31	New Bedford	J. A. M. Earle, Hiram Nye	August 11, 1906	July 4, 1908	Atlantic
32	New Bedford	A. O. Gibbons, Charles S. Church	September 2, 1908	September 12, 1910	Atlantic
33	New Bedford	Charles S. Church	May 10, 1911	August 9, 1913	Atlantic
34	New Bedford	Benjamin D. Cleveland	September 5, 1916	October 23, 1917	Atlantic
35	New Bedford	James Edwards	July 16, 1918	September 7, 1919	Atlantic
36	New Bedford	James Edwards	October 18, 1919	July 16, 1920	Atlantic
37	Provincetown	J. Gonsalves	September 9, 1920	May 28, 1921	Atlantic
38*	New Bedford	George Fred Tilton	May 7, 1925	May 7, 1925	
39*	Fairhaven	William H. Tripp	November 5, 1941	November 8, 1941	

== Preservation ==
Charles W. Morgan was nearly destroyed in 1924 when the steamer Sankaty caught fire and broke free of her mooring lines. The burning Sankaty drifted into Morgan's port quarter, but the Fairhaven firemen managed to save her. This event spurred Harry Neyland and some New Bedford citizens to restore and preserve the Morgan, but the attempts were unsuccessful. Neyland then persuaded Colonel Edward Howland Robinson Green to save the ship. Neyland appealed to Green that the Morgan was of historical importance and was a family heirloom because she was once co-owned by Green's grandfather and his wife's company. Green had the ship towed to his estate in Round Hill (Dartmouth, Massachusetts) and founded Whaling Enshrined, consisting of himself, Neyland, and John Bullard, the great-grandson of Charles Waln Morgan.

Captain George Fred Tilton began restoring the Morgan, making her into an exhibition for Green's estate in a berth constructed by Frank Taylor. Green held a dedication ceremony on the 86th anniversary of the ship's launch and gave her to Whaling Enshrined on July 21, 1926. The ship's fate came into question when Tilton died in 1932 and Green died in 1935, resulting in lengthy court proceedings over Green's estate. The 1938 New England hurricane damaged Morgan's hull and tore the sails; Whaling Enshrined attempted to secure funds for the ship but were unable to do so.

In 1941, the Morgan was saved by the Marine Historical Association (later renamed Mystic Seaport) based on Taylor's word that the ship could be freed and towed to Mystic, Connecticut. Taylor's crew dug the ship from her berth and dredged a channel for her to pass through, but the first attempt to pull her free was unsuccessful. More digging and caulking of the ship preceded her successful tugging into the channel, and the century-old hull withstood the move and floated into bay with assistance from the Coast Guard cutter General Greene.

She was towed to the old berth in Fairhaven for several days of preparations and repairs before the trip to Mystic.

On November 5, 1941, General Greene pulled Charles W. Morgan from the wharf only to have her be caught by the tide and swept downstream, coming to rest on a mud flat and taking two hours to be freed. The journey came to an end on November 8 when she passed through the Mystic bridge and was moored in the Mystic Seaport. The Seaport took shape around Charles W. Morgan with the restoration of its buildings and historic ships that came to reside alongside the Morgan. As author Edouard Stackpole describes it, "Over it all, the Morgan presided like Old Neptune—the centerpiece, the king seated on a throne of gravel, towering high above the scene."

== Restoration ==
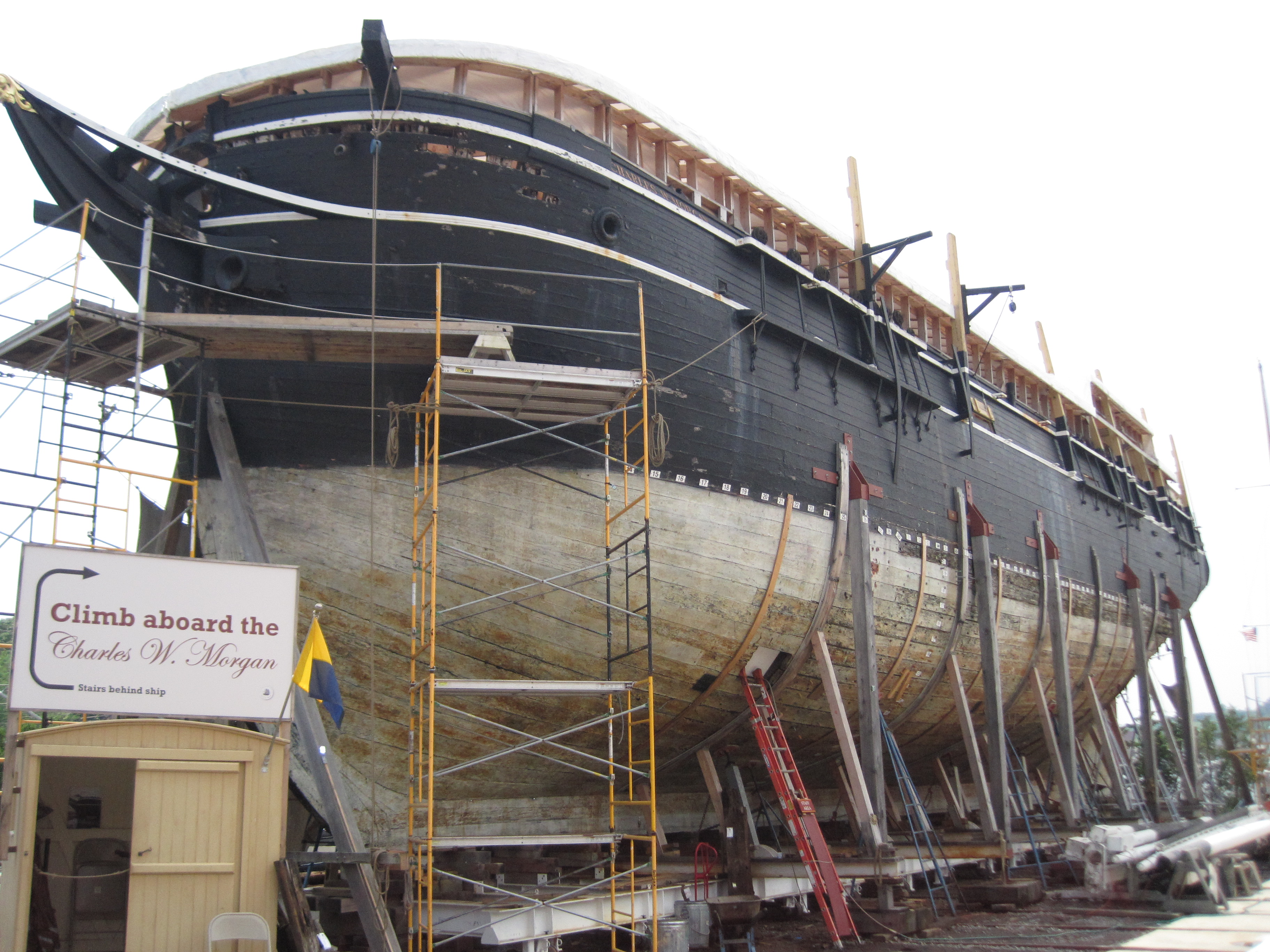
Charles W. Morgan in dry-dock undergoing restoration

Charles W. Morgan arrived at Mystic Seaport in December 1941, and she was declared a National Historic Landmark and listed on the National Register of Historic Places in 1966. In 1971, Melbourne Brindle of Bridgeport, Connecticut, designed four commemorative stamps of historic landmarks including the Morgan.

For the first 30 years at Mystic Seaport, she was surrounded by a bed of sand to prevent her from sinking. Even so, she was open to the public and was the centerpiece of a recreated 19th century maritime village museum inspired by Colonial Williamsburg. She is the only preserved 19th century whaling ship in the world.

The Mystic Seaport undertook a restoration and preservation project in 1968 to make her seaworthy, and the sand bed was removed. Prior to the 1968 restoration, she had a wide white stripe painted on her sides with large black squares that resembled gun ports when viewed at a distance. This "camouflage" was often employed by 19th century merchant ships to make them resemble warships so as to deter pirates and hostile navies.

In 2010, Mystic Seaport engaged in a multimillion-dollar project to restore the ship to seaworthy status. She was re-launched into the Mystic River on July 21, 2013, marking the 172nd anniversary of the vessel's initial launch. During the summer of 2014, she sailed her 38th voyage on tour of New England seaports which included New London, Connecticut, Newport, Rhode Island, Boston, and her home town of New Bedford, Massachusetts.

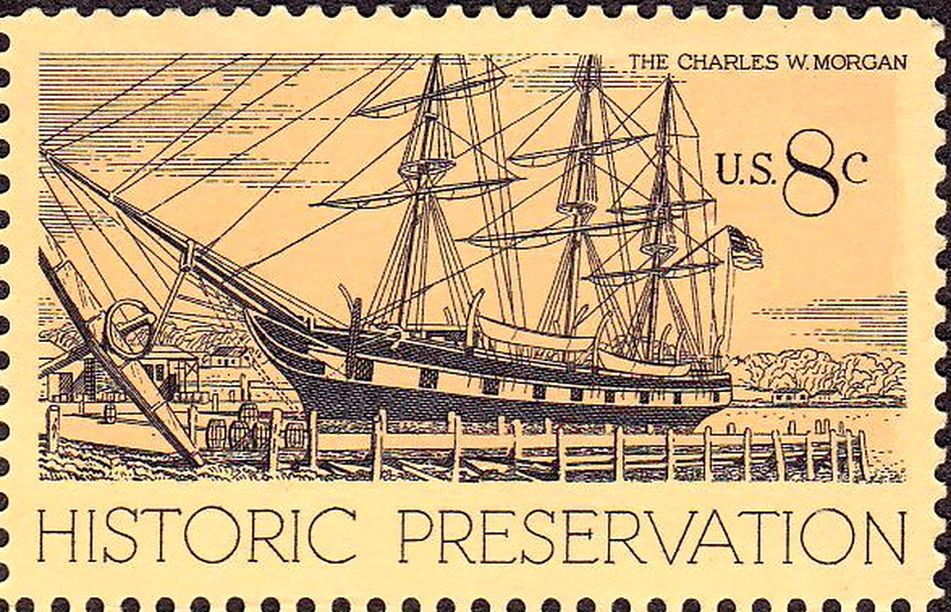
1971 U.S. commemorative stamp honoring Charles W. Morgan by Melbourne Brindle

== See also ==
- List of National Historic Landmarks in Connecticut
- National Register of Historic Places listings in New London County, Connecticut
- List of museum ships

Other preserved 19th-century sailing ships:

- USS Constitution
- USS Niagara
- USS Constellation
- Cutty Sark
- Effie M. Morrissey / Ernestina
- Coronet
