= Charles Waln Morgan =

American whaling industry executive, banker and businessman

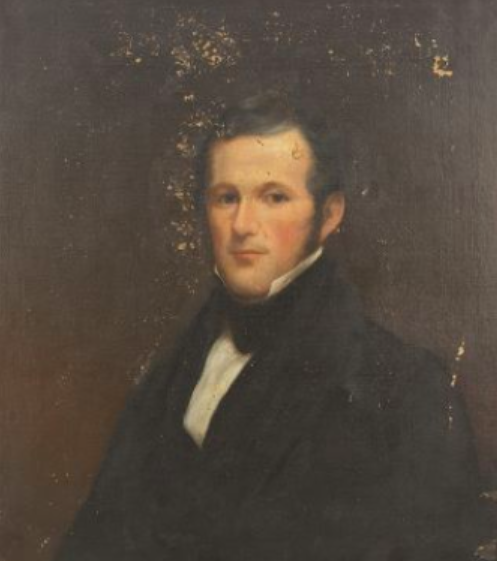
- Born: September 12, 1796; Philadelphia, Pennsylvania, US
- Died: April 7, 1861 (aged 64)
- Resting place: Oak Grove Cemetery, New Bedford, Massachusetts
- Occupations: Whaling industry, banking
- Years active: 1819–1861

Charles Waln Morgan (September 14, 1796 – April 7, 1861) was a whaling industry executive, banker and businessman. At his peak in the whaling industry, he owned fourteen whaling ships, one of which was named after him, the Charles W. Morgan. It became a National Historic Landmark. He sold the sperm oil that came from his ships, and also used it in his candle-making factory.

He was an abolitionist, and for the early years of his life, while he lived in Philadelphia, he was a Quaker. After he moved to New Bedford, he became a member of the Unitarian First Congregational Society.

== Early life and education ==
Morgan, the son of Thomas Morgan and Ann Waln Morgan, was born on September 14, 1796, in Philadelphia. Born into the Quaker faith, he had five siblings. His father died in 1804. His mother, also called Nancy, was born about 1760 and died on June 2, 1814, of consumption. They were the ancestors of many notable families of Philadelphia, including the Whartons, Rotchs, Churchmans, and Morgans. (Note: Thomas Morgan, after being raised in the household of Robert Waln and Rebecca (Coffin) Waln of Philadelphia, married Waln's daughter, Ann in the Quaker Meeting House in Philadelphia. Thomas died in 1804, and Ann died later of consumption. Their children included Robert, who died in 1805, Eliza, Thomas, Rebecca, Charles, Ann, and Susan.) and Morgan became head of the family. His uncle, also named Charles Waln Morgan, was the executor of the estate. Morgan and his siblings married people from New Bedford and became established there. Rebecca married William R. Rodman. Francis Rotch courted and married his sister Anne. Susan married Benjamin Rodman.

Around 1817, when Morgan was 21, he went with Richard Wells, his cousin on a trip to the West. Traveling for pleasure and for work, he documented his journey, the people he met, and places he visited in detail. He noted in 1819, that he was spending beyond his means, and having to take money from the family's principal investments. When the estate was settled, Morgan received stocks, about $14,000 (equivalent to $294,500 in 2025), and the ship Enterprise, worth about $4,000 (equivalent to $84,130 in 2025). Upon receiving his share of the estate, he was able to marry.

== Marriage and children ==
He married Sarah Rodman (1793-1888), the daughter of Samuel and Elizabeth Rodman, on June 3, 1819. (Note: Morgan captured his thoughts and feelings in a diary, in which he spoke of Sarah as "my darling girl", "my sweet girl", and "my dear girl". He expressed his desire to live in New Bedford, where she lived.) They were married in the Quaker Meeting House in New Bedford. She was born on October 31, 1793, and had lived in New Bedford, Massachusetts. They had five children between 1821 and 1836: Emily, Samuel, Isabel, Elizabeth and Clara.

He was a Quaker in Philadelphia, but left the faith soon after he moved to New Bedford. He was an abolitionist, and at least by one person called a "fierce abolitionist." Between 1820 and 1840, Sarah and Charles employed 45 women, for several months each, who may have lived with them. A known employee was Polly Johnson, who with her husband Nathan took in Frederick Douglass when they had their own house. Peter Emanuel postulates that this was to give former slaves a "foothold" to establishing a successful life in New Bedford. Morgan wrote in 1841, "Sooner or later the minds of all good men must come to his conclusions & act upon them, be the consequences what they may."

In 1821, he built a house facing the New Bedford harbour. It looked down William Street and was near Joseph Arnold on County Street. The family celebrated Christmas with gifts and a Christmas tree, which became popular in the early 19th century in the United States. He read classic authors, like the Brontë family, Daniel Defoe, and William Makepeace Thackeray. He purchased two paintings made by John James Audubon. He gave natural history lectures on the whale at the New Bedford Lyceum, which he helped establish.

In a tribute following his death, his family and community were said to have lost a "kind and indulgent father, his wife an affectionate husband, and the community in which he resided a benevolent, enterprising, honest, christian man..."

== Career ==
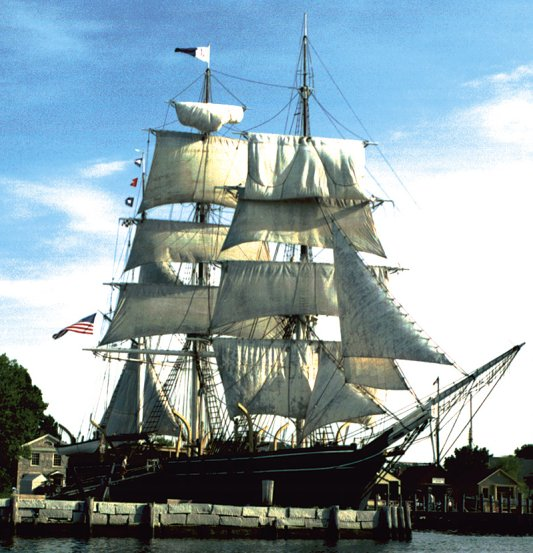
Charles W. Morgan

He began working for the William Rotch and Samuel Rodman whaling firm in his late teens and became a partner. His father-in-law was one of the two founding partners. He established his own whaling firm in the 1820s. He built the ship Charles W. Morgan for $50,000 and launched it in 1841. By 1841, he owned 15 whaling ships. From 1821 to 1845, he had shares in eighteen other whaling ships. He sold sperm oil to lighthouses and used it to make candles in his factory. The whaling and sperm oil industries began to fall and collapsed in the 1850s.

He was a banker, interested in paper mills and real estate. Morgan invested in real estate in New Bedford, as well as Illinois, New York, Ohio, Michigan, and Indiana. He was a director of the Bedford Commercial Bank for 20 years, and later felt that James Arnold, who had become a director, and president George Howland were out to destroy him financially. He was part owner of the Pocasset Cotton Mill in Fall River, Massachusetts, and invested in a paper mill, coal fields, a nail factory, insurance companies, and railroads. As the whaling industry started to shut down, he began investing in steel and iron works in Pennsylvania. Investing in the firm with his wife's brother-in-law, William Logan Fisher, he was a senior partner of Duncannon Iron Company. He suffered financial losses and in 1848 had to sell the Charles W. Morgan to the Howland family. The ship is now a National Historic Landmark.

== Philanthropist ==
He helped establish both the Friends Academy and the Lyceum. He donated funds for the New Bedford Temperance Society, the New Bedford Free Library, and the Port Society to benefit sailors. He joined the Unitarian First Congregational Society soon after moving to New Bedford and donated funds to the church.

== Death ==
Morgan died on April 7, 1861, when he was in debt. His papers are held at the New Bedford Whaling Museum and at the G. W. Blunt White Library at Mystic Seaport in Mystic, Connecticut. Sarah, who still lived at the County Street mansion, had five servants in 1880. She died in 1888.
