= Thomas Luce & Company =

Thomas Luce & Company was one of the last American whaling companies on the east coast. Based in New Bedford, Massachusetts and founded by an Azorean immigrant, the Thos. Luce company operated thirty-six whaling voyages between 1886 and 1903 into the Atlantic Ocean and Hudson Bay.

== Capt. Thomas Luce ==
The company's founder and owner, Capt. Thomas Luce (1827-1911), was born on the island of Flores in the Azores, to Azorean parents. “Thomas Luce” wasn't his real name, which has been lost. He emigrated to the United States as a teenager aboard the whaling ship Brunette, commanded by Capt. Eddy Manter Luce Jr. (1807-1849) of New Bedford and Falmouth, MA. The captain's only son, Thomas R. Luce (1836-bef 1840), had recently died, and so the captain evidently became a father figure to young Thomas, and gave him his late son's name to adopt. Although there is some evidence that young Thomas could have first come to the United States on the Brunette’s 1840 voyage, it was on a second whaling trip in 1842 that Thomas returned permanently with Capt. Luce to New Bedford. (Shortly after the second voyage the Brunette was purchased by Samuel Colt of Colt revolver fame, and blown up in a public demonstration of his new invention, an explosive underwater mine.)

As a teenager, Thomas Luce sailed on the ship Roman in 1844 to the northwest coast, and in 1849 he joined the gold rush to California, where he was modestly successful in seeking gold. He returned to New Bedford by 1851, became a naturalized citizen, and married Capt. Luce's daughter, Hannah B. Luce (1832-1879) in 1852. He began a cooperage business in New Bedford, which he ran for decades. In 1880 he married his second wife, Lydia Elizabeth Payne (1839-1911), and shortly afterwards became interested in the whaling business, although he remained a cooper until at least 1890. His daughter Annie Budlong Luce (c.1858-1890) married the man who became the longest-serving mayor of New Bedford, Charles Ashley, in 1879.

== Luce's Fleet ==
The Thos. Luce Co. owned between eleven and fourteen whaling ships (sources vary), and was the agent for thirty-six whaling voyages between 1886 and 1903, including expeditions by the schooner Francis Allyn, schooner Era, schooner Mary E. Simmons, schooner Antarctic, schooner Clara L. Sparks, bark George & Mary, schooner Sarah W. Hunt, schooner Star King, schooner Pearl Nelson, schooner Charles H. Hodgdon, and the bark Desdemona. George Comer, captain of the Era, complained about the crews the Luce provided, claiming they were unseasoned and inept. Capt. George Comer also wrote about the aging Luce coming to the wharf to see off each expedition.

In 1899, Luce opened a whaling and trading station at the mouth of Wager Bay on Hudson Bay, manned by whaler George Cleveland. Cleveland built a twenty-four by twelve-foot wooden shack and spent two winters there, trading for furs with the local Inuit.

By 1902 Luce's business began to be referred to as “Thomas Luce & Son” - evidently referring to his youngest son Charles T. Luce (1864 - ____), who was listed as a New Bedford “shipping merchant” by 1900, and was said to be involved in his father's business. However, the business did not last long into the new century. The company's final two voyages were in 1903: the Mary E. Simmons, and the Era, which returned to New Bedford in July 1904 and Oct. 1905, respectively. The Luce family sold the Era to New York furrier F. N. Monjo during the winter of 1905–6.

Thomas Luce fully retired about 1907, at the age of eighty. During his final years he traveled with his wife extensively in Europe and spent his winters in Florida and California.
