= Aivilingmiut =

Canadian Inuit group

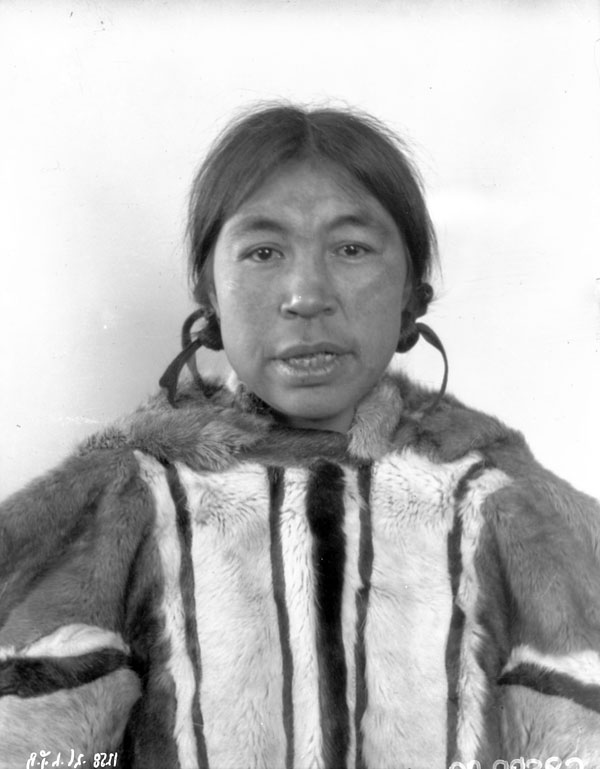
Aivilingmiut woman, Repulse Bay, 1926

The Aivilingmiut (or Aivilik) are those Inuit who traditionally have resided north of Hudson Bay in Canada, near Naujaat (Repulse Bay), Chesterfield Inlet, Southampton Island, and Cape Fullerton. They are descendants of the Thule people and are considered a southern subgroup of the Iglulik Inuit. In the late 19th century, they migrated south to work among American whalers hunting in Hudson Bay.

The Aivilingmiut are known for their dog teams and their walrus hunting.
