= USS Finback =

Two submarines of the United States Navy have borne the name USS Finback, named in honor of the finback.

- The first USS Finback (SS-230), was a Gato-class submarine, commissioned in 1942 and stricken in 1958.
- The second USS Finback (SSN-670), was a Sturgeon-class submarine, commissioned in 1970 and stricken in 1997.
