= Melbourne Brindle =

Australian-American illustrator and painter

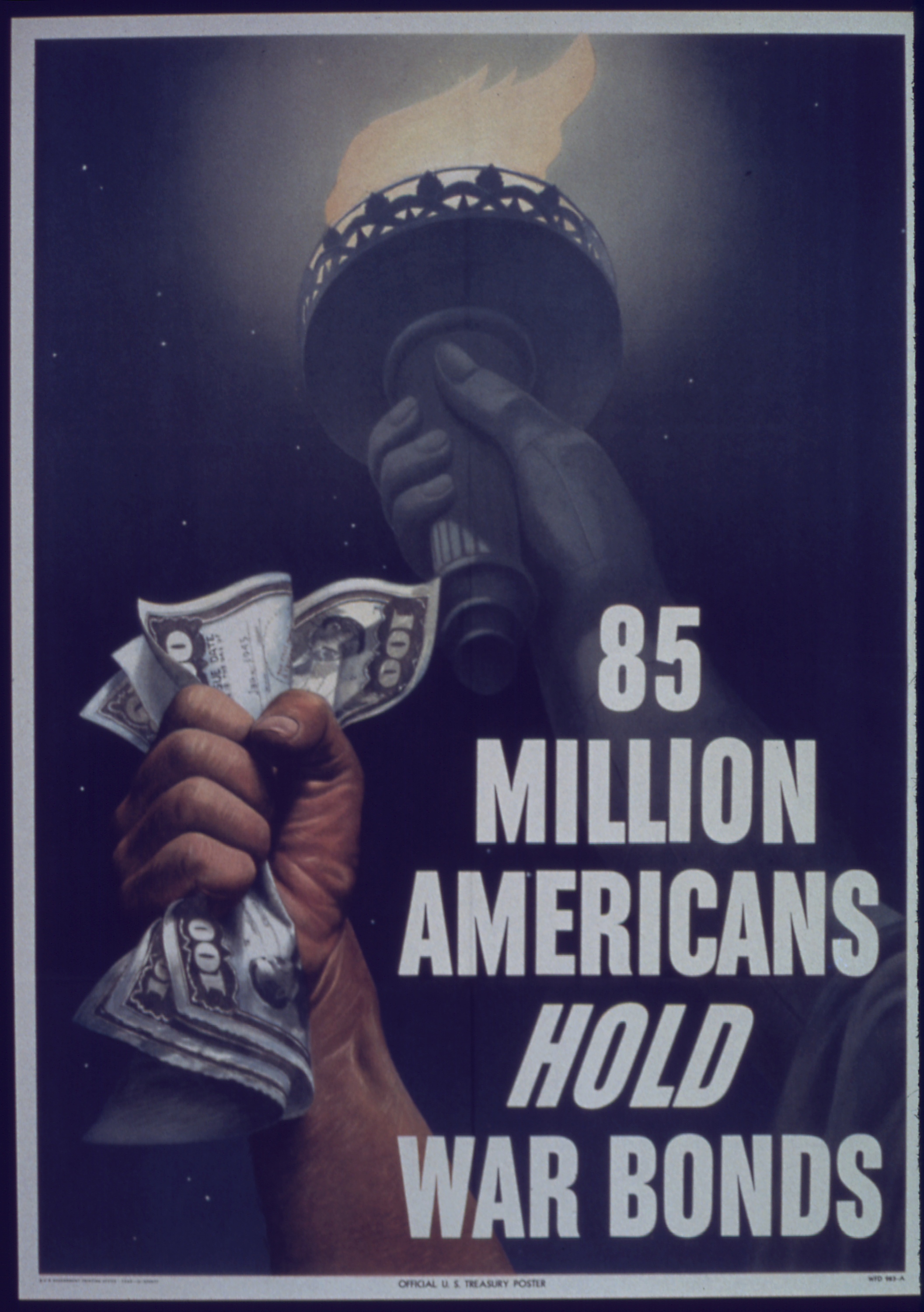
"85 Million Americans Hold War Bonds", World War II poster by Melbourne Brindle

Ewart Melbourne Brindle (November 18, 1904 – September 19, 1995) was an Australian-American illustrator and painter. His work included posters for World War II war bonds, magazine illustrations and covers, and US postage stamps; he was particularly known for his illustrations of cars, and in 1971 published a book of portraits of Rolls-Royce Silver Ghosts.

Melbourne Brindle was born in and named for Melbourne, one of seven children of Arthur Brindle, who was also an artist; in 1918 his family immigrated to San Francisco, where he briefly studied at the California School of Fine Arts and worked first for a department store, then for an advertising agency. At age 33 he moved to New York, where he started his own agency; his commissions included Douglas Aircraft, United Airlines, the Italian Steamship Lines, and various car manufacturers. He became known as a car artist, and portrayed the Ford Thunderbird and the Buick Riviera in their first advertisements in 1955 and 1963, and updated the Goodyear Tire ads with a new car each year in the 1950s and 1960s.

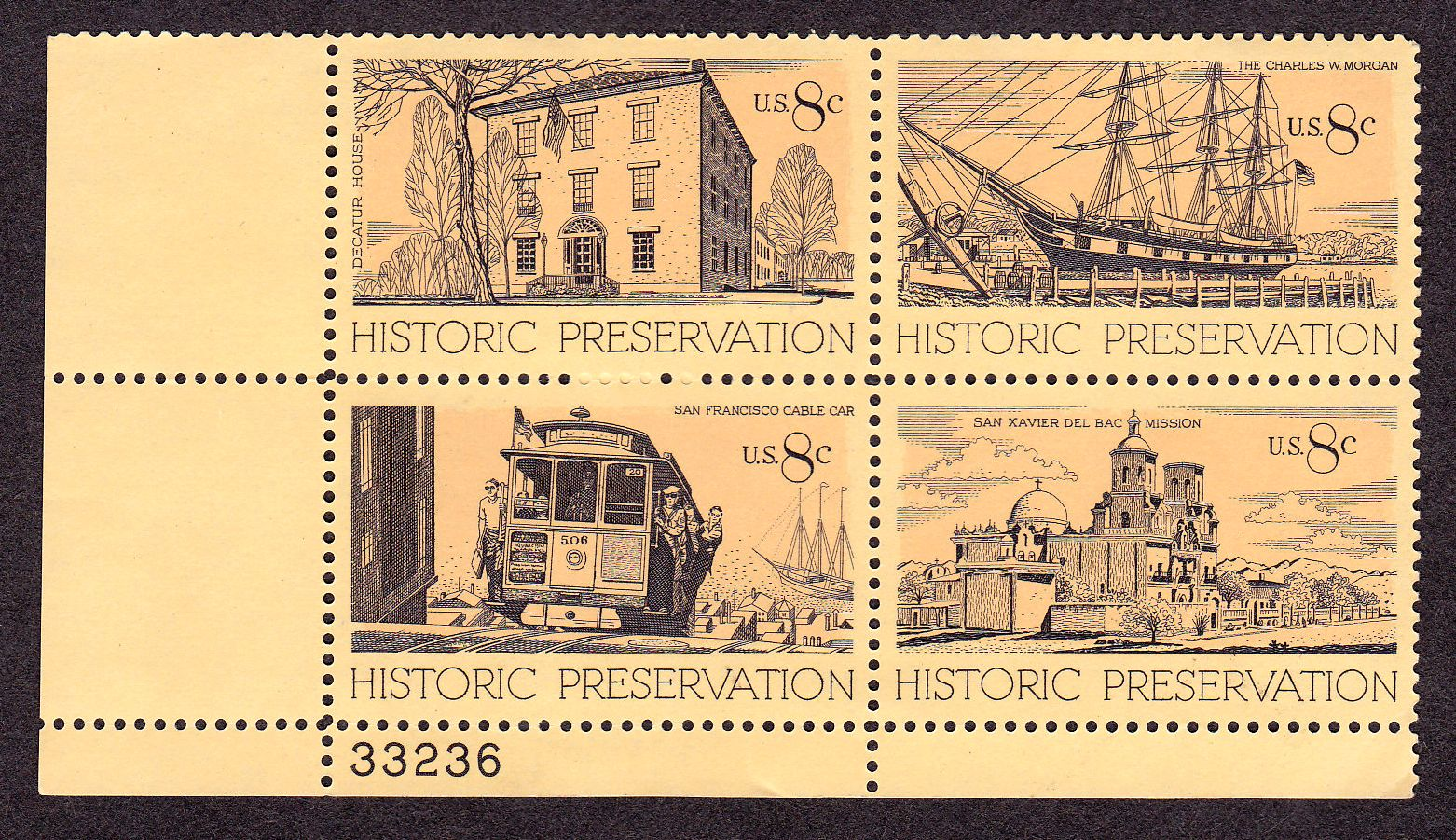
1971 Historic Preservation postage stamps

Brindle was initially known for his black and white work, for which he won medals at the 1934 and 1938 New York Art Directors Club shows. In 1940 he started illustrating magazines, initially Woman's Home Companion. He created covers for the Saturday Evening Post, The Medical Times, and others. During World War II he created posters for war bonds, including "Warhawks are Killers!" (1943) and "85 Million Americans Hold War Bonds" (1945). For the US Post Office, he designed a 1971 set of stamps on Historic Preservation, 1972 postal cards for the Tourism Year of the Americas, the 1975 "World Peace through Law" stamp, and a 1982 postal card depicting the Academy of Music in Philadelphia.

He collected and restored antique cars, and in the late 1960s retired from advertising and devoted himself to painting; he spent several years researching and creating Twenty Silver Ghosts, a book of paintings of pre–World War I Rolls-Royces with text by Phil May. It was published in 1971 and reissued in 1979. His painting of King Edward VII's 1902 Daimler hangs in Buckingham Palace, and his painting of the Wright brothers' first flight is in the Air and Space Museum in Washington, DC.

Melbourne Brindle was married for fifty years to Louise "Mimi" Ives Congdon, with whom he lived in San Francisco, CA., New Canaan, CT., and Block Island, R.I., along with their daughter. His second marriage was to Emily Bennis; in 1978 he moved to her hometown of Boston. They later lived in Camden, Maine, and finally in Vero Beach, Florida, where he died at the age of 90 after a series of strokes.

== Publications ==
- Famous GM Cars: A General Motors Family Album. Paintings by Melbourne Brindle, social and historical background descriptions for each period by Philip Van Doren Stern. General Motors Rack Information Service, 1962. OCLC 4377143
- Twenty Rolls-Royce Silver Ghosts: The Incomparable Pre-World War I Motor Car, 1907–1914. Paintings by Melbourne Brindle, text by Phil May, introduction by Julien Levy. New York: McGraw Hill, 1971. ISBN 9780214653551.
