= Finback (whaler) =

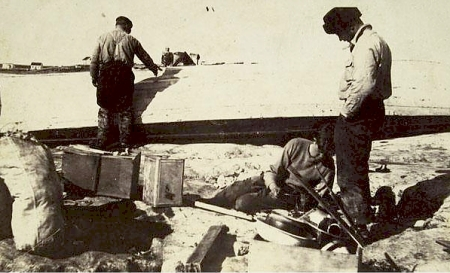
The crew of the wrecked Finback, repairing one of her boats.

The Finback was a schooner wrecked near Chesterfield Inlet in Hudson Bay in 1919. Sergeant W. O. Douglas of the Royal North-West Mounted Police, who helped restore the crew to civilization, described her as the last whaling ship from New England to work in the area. Her captain, George Comer, was a very experienced whaling captain, but scholarly biography says that the ship was supplying a scientific expedition on this voyage.

Douglas, who found himself responsible for feeding and housing Comer and her crew, described Comer as a fierce disciplinarian, who described his crew as having been "shanghaied" - involuntarily signed on after they had been first plied with drink. Douglas described suspecting that Comer and her owners had planned to wreck the Finback for her insurance value.

Douglas described bidding on the salvage rights to the wreck only because the other bids were so low, and purchasing her for $390 (equivalent to $7,242 in 2025). Because she was hung up on the rock that holed her hull, much of the ship was still above water, and he commissioned an Inuit family to visit the site, giving them permission to help themselves to all the canned goods aboard, in return for bringing back some of the ship's maritime gear. He turned a profit by selling the ship's boats. Douglas later inspected the wreck himself, and thought, with expert help, the ship could have been salvaged. But, eventually, a storm pulled her off the rock that had holed her, and she finally sank in deeper water.
