= Qikiqtaaluk (Foxe Basin) =

Uninhabited island in Nunavut, Canada

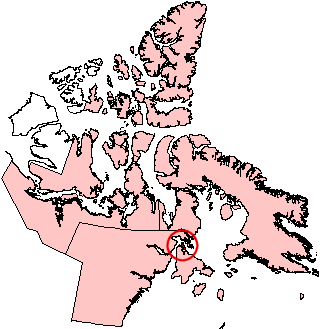
- Location of Qikiqtaaluk on a Nunavut map

- Location within Nunavut Location within Canada

Geography
- Location: Foxe Basin
- Coordinates: 65°47′31″N 84°52′28″W
- Archipelago: Arctic Archipelago
- Area: 789 km^{2} (305 sq mi)
- Highest point: 368 m (1,207 ft)

Administration
- Canada
- Nunavut: Nunavut
- Region: Kivalliq

Demographics
- Population: 0

Qikiqtaaluk (ᕿᑭᖅᑖᓗᒃ), formerly White Island, is one of the uninhabited Canadian arctic islands in the Kivalliq Region, Nunavut, Canada. Located in Foxe Basin off the northern tip of Southampton Island, it measures 789 km^{2} (305 sq mi) in area.

White Island is separated from Southampton Island by the narrow (less than 2 km (1.2 mi) Comer Strait to the west, and Falcon Strait to the south. There are several capes including Cape Middleton, Cape Frigid, and Cape Deas. Whale Sound and Toms Harbour are on the eastern coast, and Frozen Strait is just beyond. White Island is surrounded by several small islands including Passage Island, Whale Island, Seekoo Island, Nas Island, as well as many that are unnamed. The highest peaks are 368 m (1,207 ft) and 367 m (1,204 ft). While the island is strewn with lakes, the largest is 17 km (11 mi) long.
