= Monjo Company =

American fur trading company

The Monjo Company was a New York City-based fur trading business that obtained furs in the Canadian arctic, Alaska, and the Northwest United States, and sold them wholesale in New York during the late 19th and early 20th centuries. It was among the eleven largest fur importers in New York.

== Founding ==
The Monjo company was founded by Nicholas F. Monjo, a Spanish immigrant from Algiers, shortly after the Civil War, in Brooklyn, New York, and became a substantial business by the early 1880s.

The company was located at 160 Mercer St, opposite Fireman’s Hall in 1884, when the building suffered a fire. Monjo losses in water damage totaled nearly $3000. By 1905, the company was located at 34-36 Houston Street and had become the American agent for A & W Nesbitt & Co. of London. The business later leased an 11,000 sq ft (1,000 m^{2}). storefront on West 25th Street in New York City, and at one time was a partner in the Monjo, Murley & Hennessey, New York and London fur commission house.

== F. N. Monjo and schooner purchases ==
N. F. Monjo’s son, Ferdinand Nicolas Monjo (1875–1929) of Stamford, Connecticut, took over the business by the early 1900s. F. N. Monjo was born in Brooklyn, but moved to Stamford after he graduated from school.

In early 1906 the company purchased a whaling schooner, the Era, from the Thomas Luce Company of New Bedford and hired Capt. George Comer as its master. Comer wrecked the vessel shortly afterwards on the coast of Newfoundland.

The company’s second purchase was the A. T. Gifford. Capt. Comer commanded this vessel during two voyages to Hudson Bay during 1907-1912 hunting for whales and trading for furs, followed by Capt. James Wing in 1913, and finally by Capt. Arthur Gibbons in 1915. The Gifford met disaster with its entire crew killed in 1915 in Hudson Bay.

In June 1913, Monjo sent two traders, George Cleveland and Mr. Bumpus to establish a trading post at Cape Fullerton. The post lasted until about 1919.

== The Monjo family ==
Ferdinand Nicholas Monjo died at his home "The Cedars" in Stamford, CT in 1929. His obituary notes "He was head of a wholesale fur business at 152 West Twenty-fifth Street, New York, bearing his name." He was married to Jennie Rogers Monjo. At the time of his death he was a director of the New York Auction Company and the co-director of the Charity Chest of the Fur Industry of the City of New York as well as the Fur Trade Foundation. Ferdinand and Jennie May Monjo had three sons: Ferdinand Monjo Jr., Edward R. Monjo, and George L. Monjo. F. N. Monjo’s grandson, Ferdinand Nicholas Monjo III (1924–1978), became a popular children’s author, and wrote about his grandfather’s business in several of his books. Another grandson, John Cameron Monjo, was a career Foreign Service officer who served as the United States Ambassador to Malaysia from 1987 to 1989, the United States Ambassador to Indonesia from 1989 to 1992, and the United States Ambassador to Pakistan from 1992 to 1995.
