= Maittuq =

Island in Nunavut, Canada

- Location within Nunavut Location within Canada

Geography
- Location: Roes Welcome Sound
- Coordinates: 66°09′16″N 085°50′49″W
- Archipelago: Arctic Archipelago

Administration
- Canada
- Territory: Nunavut
- Region: Kivalliq

Demographics
- Population: Uninhabited
- Ethnic groups: Inuit

Maittuq, formerly Anarnittuq Island, is a small uninhabited island, approximately 44 km (27 mi) south of Naujaat in the Kivalliq Region of Nunavut, Canada. It is located towards the north end of Roes Welcome Sound, just offshore of the Canadian mainland, where it meets Frozen Strait.

To the south lies Southampton Island and the community of Coral Harbour.

== Climate ==
Naujaat to the north has a tundra climate (Köppen ET) with short but cool summers and long, cold winters.

Climate data for Naujaat (Naujaat Airport) Climate ID: 2403490 ; coordinates 66°31′17″N 86°13′29″W; elevation: 22.9 m (75 ft); 1981–2010 normals
| Month | Jan | Feb | Mar | Apr | May | Jun | Jul | Aug | Sep | Oct | Nov | Dec | Year |
|---|---|---|---|---|---|---|---|---|---|---|---|---|---|
| Record high humidex | −4.6 | −11.6 | −2.1 | 2.4 | 7.9 | 21.1 | 29.3 | 21.9 | 15.4 | 4.2 | 0.4 | −1.0 | 29.3 |
| Record high °C (°F) | −1.7 (28.9) | −6.1 (21.0) | −1.5 (29.3) | 3.5 (38.3) | 8.0 (46.4) | 22.5 (72.5) | 28.0 (82.4) | 23.0 (73.4) | 15.5 (59.9) | 4.0 (39.2) | 0.0 (32.0) | 1.1 (34.0) | 28.0 (82.4) |
| Mean daily maximum °C (°F) | −27.5 (−17.5) | −27.5 (−17.5) | −22.1 (−7.8) | −12.6 (9.3) | −3.2 (26.2) | 6.4 (43.5) | 13.6 (56.5) | 10.7 (51.3) | 3.4 (38.1) | −3.7 (25.3) | −15.1 (4.8) | −21.4 (−6.5) | −8.2 (17.2) |
| Daily mean °C (°F) | −30.7 (−23.3) | −30.8 (−23.4) | −26.1 (−15.0) | −16.7 (1.9) | −6.5 (20.3) | 3.2 (37.8) | 9.1 (48.4) | 7.1 (44.8) | 1.1 (34.0) | −6.4 (20.5) | −18.7 (−1.7) | −25.0 (−13.0) | −11.7 (10.9) |
| Mean daily minimum °C (°F) | −33.6 (−28.5) | −33.8 (−28.8) | −30.0 (−22.0) | −20.9 (−5.6) | −9.7 (14.5) | −0.1 (31.8) | 4.7 (40.5) | 3.5 (38.3) | −1.3 (29.7) | −9.2 (15.4) | −22.2 (−8.0) | −28.5 (−19.3) | −15.1 (4.8) |
| Record low °C (°F) | −47.8 (−54.0) | −50.0 (−58.0) | −45.0 (−49.0) | −40.0 (−40.0) | −29.0 (−20.2) | −11.0 (12.2) | −1.0 (30.2) | −3.0 (26.6) | −11.5 (11.3) | −31.0 (−23.8) | −42.0 (−43.6) | −46.0 (−50.8) | −50.0 (−58.0) |
| Record low wind chill | −66.0 | −64 | −59 | −50 | −30 | −19 | 0 | −8 | −18 | −41 | −50 | −59 | −66 |
| Average precipitation mm (inches) | 22.1 (0.87) | 18.0 (0.71) | 21.6 (0.85) | 26.7 (1.05) | 18.6 (0.73) | 24.7 (0.97) | 31.1 (1.22) | 49.5 (1.95) | 36.0 (1.42) | 31.6 (1.24) | 27.6 (1.09) | 21.3 (0.84) | 328.7 (12.94) |
| Average rainfall mm (inches) | 0.0 (0.0) | 0.0 (0.0) | 0.0 (0.0) | 0.4 (0.02) | 2.5 (0.10) | 19.1 (0.75) | 31.1 (1.22) | 48.5 (1.91) | 25.2 (0.99) | 2.1 (0.08) | 0.0 (0.0) | 0.0 (0.0) | 128.9 (5.07) |
| Average snowfall cm (inches) | 22.5 (8.9) | 22.5 (8.9) | 25.0 (9.8) | 30.0 (11.8) | 19.4 (7.6) | 5.2 (2.0) | 0.0 (0.0) | 0.9 (0.4) | 12.1 (4.8) | 35.5 (14.0) | 31.7 (12.5) | 24.8 (9.8) | 229.5 (90.4) |
| Average precipitation days (≥ 0.2 mm) | 10.4 | 7.6 | 11.9 | 10.1 | 9.5 | 9.1 | 9.7 | 12.2 | 11.9 | 14.7 | 11.2 | 9.9 | 128.1 |
| Average rainy days (≥ 0.2 mm) | 0.0 | 0.0 | 0.0 | 0.22 | 1.1 | 7.4 | 9.7 | 12.1 | 7.8 | 0.89 | 0.0 | 0.1 | 39.1 |
| Average snowy days (≥ 0.2 cm) | 10.3 | 8.2 | 12.5 | 10.8 | 9.2 | 2.4 | 0.0 | 0.33 | 4.9 | 13.9 | 11.7 | 10.2 | 94.5 |
Source: Environment and Climate Change Canada Canadian Climate Normals 1991–2020 (Humidex and wind chill from Canadian Climate Normals 1981–2010)
