= First Air =

Airline of Canada (1946–2019)

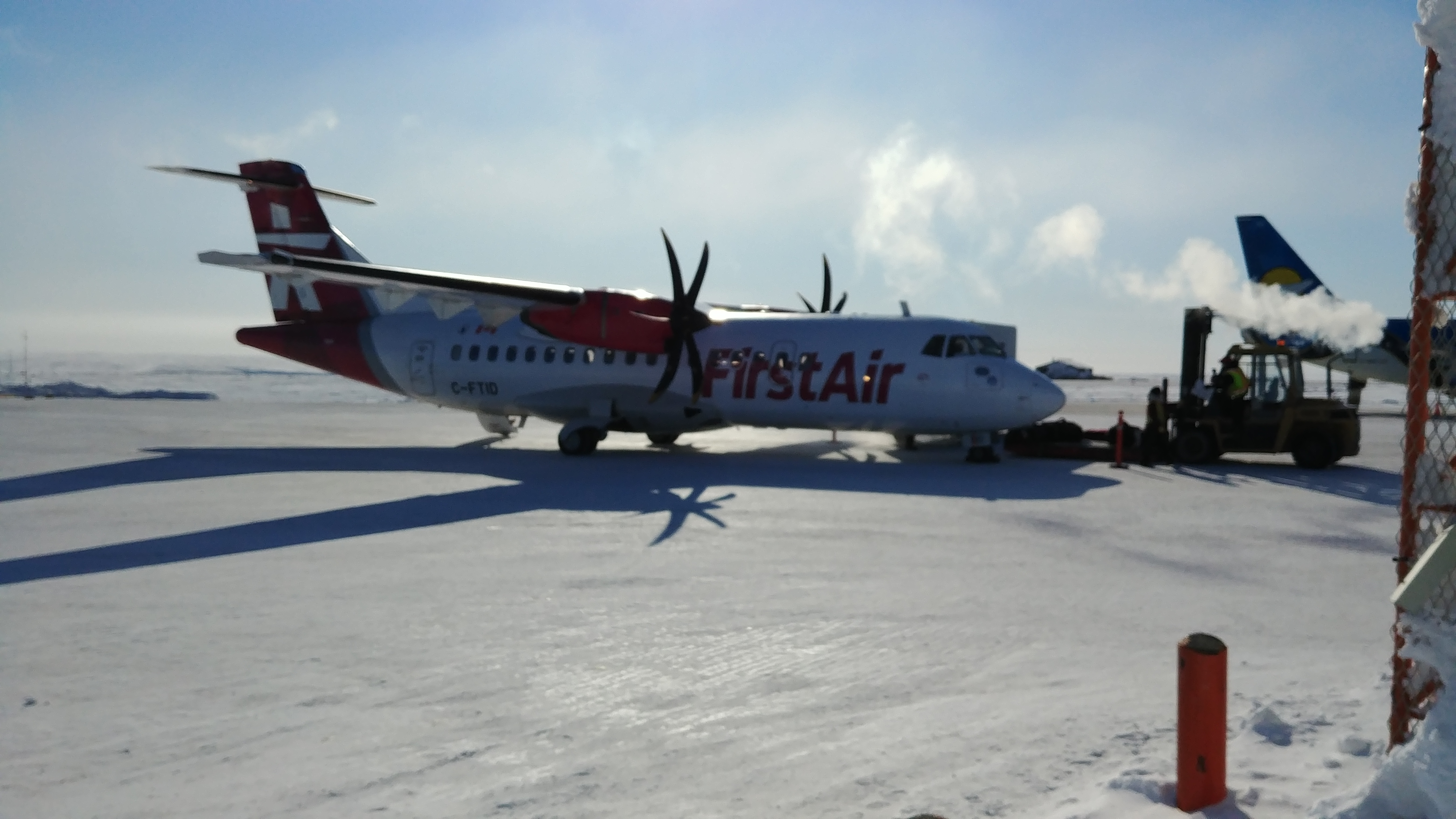
- An ATR 42 at Cambridge Bay Airport
IATA	ICAO	Call sign
7F	FAB	First Air
- Founded: 1946; 80 years ago
- Ceased operations: November 1, 2019; 7 years ago (acquired Canadian North and adopted that name)
- AOC #: Canada: 107; United States: KBJF476F
- Hubs: Iqaluit; Rankin Inlet; Yellowknife
- Frequent-flyer program: Aeroplan
- Fleet size: 31
- Destinations: 35
- Headquarters: 20 Cope Drive, Kanata, Ontario
- Key people: Shelly De Caria (President & CEO); Alexandra Pontbriand (VP Finance); Rashwan Domloge (VP Maintenance); Aaron Speer (VP Flight Operations); Andrew Pope (VP Commercial)

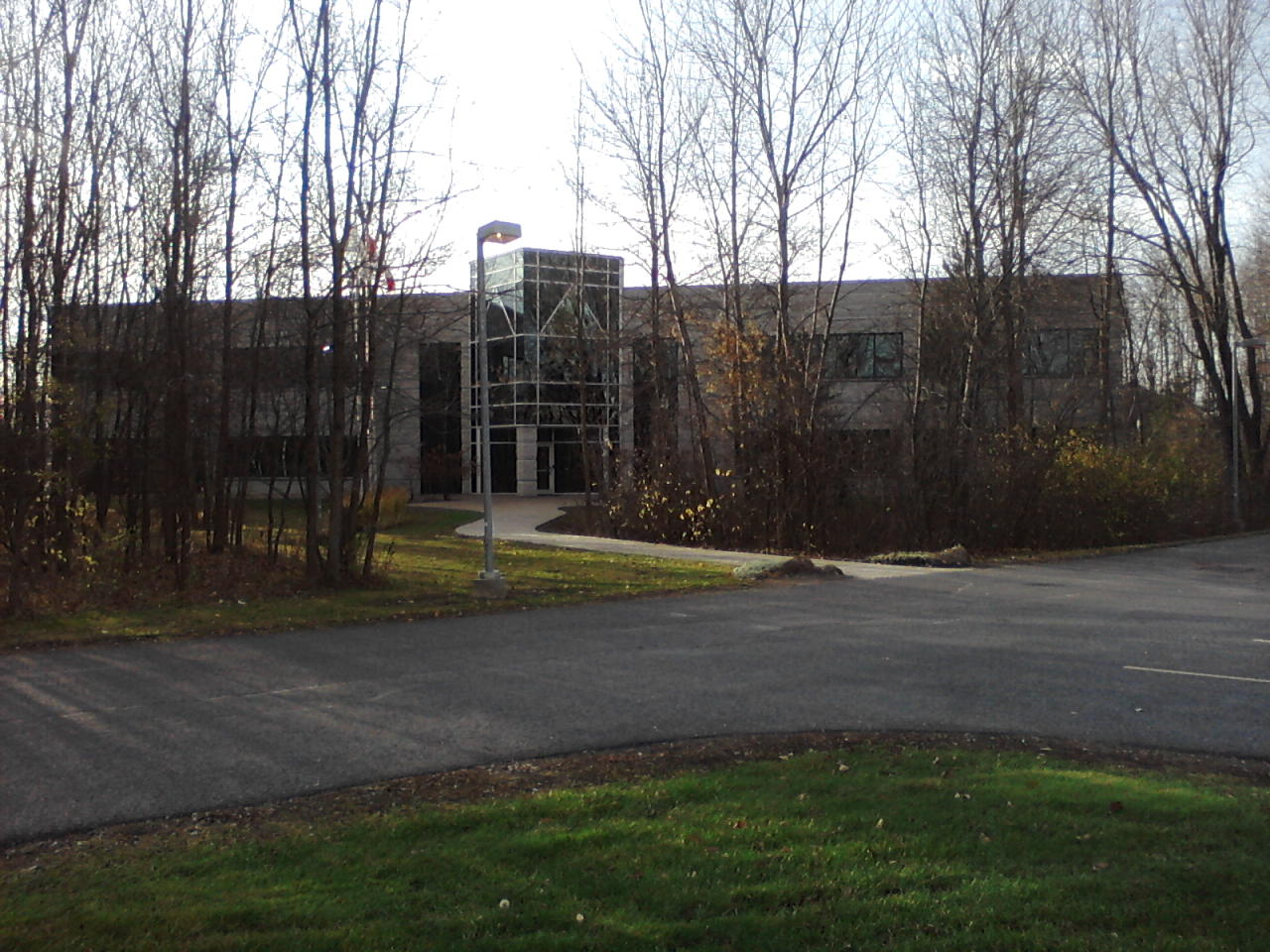
First Air's headquarters in Kanata, Ontario

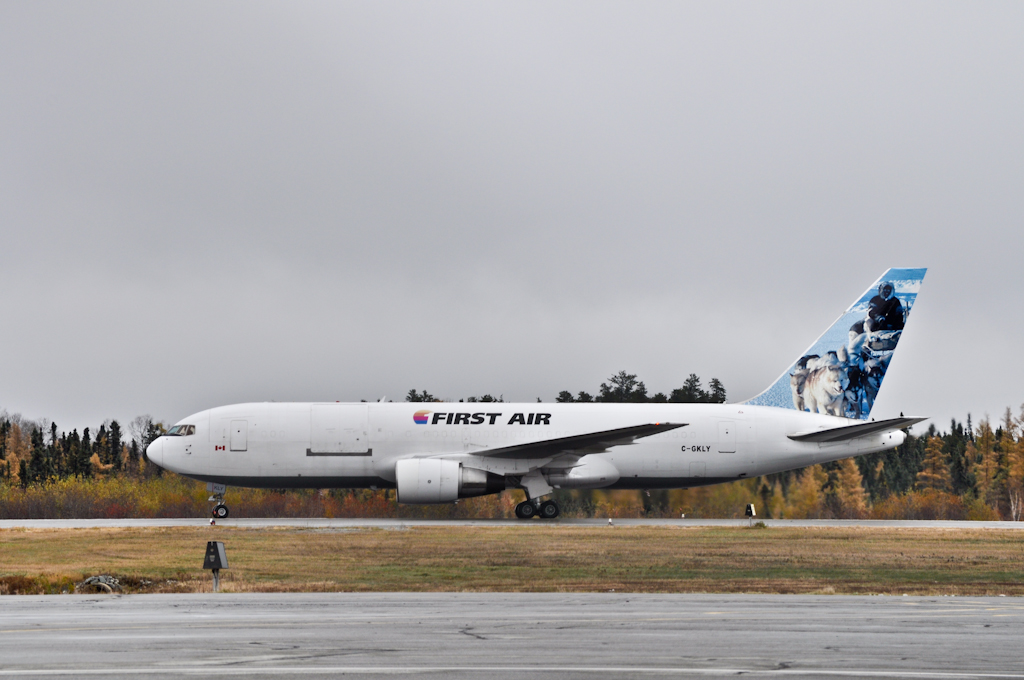
A First Air Boeing 767 at Val-d'Or Airport

Bradley Air Services Limited, operated as First Air, was an airline headquartered in Kanata, a suburb of Ottawa, Ontario, Canada. It operated services to 34 communities in Nunavut, Nunavik, and the Northwest Territories. First Air has assisted in various humanitarian missions such as the 2010 Haiti earthquake, airlifting relief supplies and equipment. Its main base, which included a large hangar, cargo and maintenance facility, was located at Ottawa Macdonald–Cartier International Airport, with hubs at Iqaluit Airport, and Yellowknife Airport. On November 1, 2019, the airline fully consolidated operations with Canadian North.

== History ==
The airline was founded at Ottawa International by Canadian aviation pioneer Russell (Russ) Bradley and started operations as Bradley Flying School in 1946, changing the name in 1950 to Bradley Air Services, concurrent with a move to Carp Airport, and is still registered under that name. First Air started scheduled operations in 1973, between Ottawa and North Bay. This service was operated with an eight-seat passenger plane.

The airline opened southern gateways at Edmonton, Winnipeg, Montreal and Ottawa. Through Kuujjuaq in Nunavik and Yellowknife in the Northwest Territories (NWT), as of 2015 the airline provided services to 26 Inuit communities in Nunavut, Nunavik and the NWT. Service to Sanikiluaq, Nunavut, was provided in partnership with Air Inuit.

In 1995, First Air acquired Ptarmigan Airways, and in 1997 Northwest Territorial Airways (also known as NWT Air), both merged into First Air. Ptarmigan Airways operated smaller turboprop aircraft types such as the Beechcraft King Air (BE-200 model), DHC-6 Twin Otter and Grumman Gulfstream I turboprops, and a single Cessna Citation II business jet aircraft. At the time of the merger NWT Air operated Boeing 737-200 jetliners and a single Lockheed L-100 Hercules cargo turboprop.

First Air was wholly owned by the Inuit of Quebec through the Makivik Corporation, which purchased the company in 1990.

On 21 August 2008, First Air fired president Bob Davis and replaced him with Scott Bateman. Davis had been president since December 1997 and had several disagreements with First Air over a period of time.

On 5 June 2009, First Air received a wide-body aircraft, a Boeing 767-223SF (Special Freighter), which was under a three-year dry lease from Cargo Aircraft Management (CAM), a subsidiary of Air Transport Services Group (ATSG). The 767 has since left the fleet.

After the introduction of the operationally and logistically more economical Boeing 767-223SF in March 2010, First Air retired and removed its two Boeing 727-233 aircraft from its fleet. One was one of only two combi types in the world, and the last 727-200 in North America on scheduled passenger-freight services. The other 727-233F full freighter was also phased out. A Hawker Siddeley HS 748 turboprop (C-GFNW) was retired in March 2011. Replacing this aircraft type were two ATR 72 Combi turboprops as part of First Air's fleet replacement program. They were outfitted with a cargo handling system, and one was outfitted with a large cargo door. A first of its kind in North America, it was able to handle built unit Load Device positions. This in turn created a larger load capacity and flexibility reaching remote communities. One began service in the last quarter of 2011, and the second in the first quarter 2012.

In 2009 First Air added routes in the Kivallaq Region adding flights from Rankin Inlet to Arviat and Baker Lake. On 30 March 2010, it added Whale Cove, Repluse Bay, Coral Harbour and Chesterfield Inlet to the Kivalliq Routes.

In February 2011, First Air and Qikiqtaaluk Corporation (QC) started a new airline named Qikiqtani First Aviation. The new company provided services throughout Nunavut's Qikiqtani Region using First Air's fleet. Another airline, Sakku First Aviation, was started the same time in partnership with Sakku Investments Corporation in Nunavut's Kivalliq Region.

In December 2011, Scott Bateman, President and CEO, abruptly resigned his position with First Air. Kris Dolinki became president and CEO after Bateman's departure.

In October 2012, Dolinki resigned his position as president and CEO of First Air. This announcement came shortly after Makivik Corporation stated that, after many rumours, its stake in First Air was not for sale. The position of President and CEO was filled on an interim basis by Chris Ferris, First Air's Vice President of Marketing and Sales.

In March 2013, First Air/Makivik Corporation hired Brock Friesen as its new president and CEO.

On 11 April 2014, the Makivik Corporation and Norterra, owners of Canadian North, began negotiations to merge the two airlines. According to a website set up the same day the new airline would be owned equally between the two companies and "a merger would create a stronger, more sustainable business, provide better service to customers and lead to new economic development opportunities across the North - "We believe the two companies would complement each other’s strengths." In October 2014, it was announced the merger would not go through, but First Air would still codeshare some flights with Canadian North.

In early 2015 First Air announced strategic agreements with Cargojet Airways and Summit Air. The 767 lease was transferred to Cargojet at that time and First Air was also providing ATR-72 turboprop services for Cargojet.

On 21 April 2015, First Air's Hercules C-GUSI flew the final civilian L382 flight in Canada, bringing to an end over 45 years of commercial Lockheed Hercules service. L382 Hercules operations in Northern Canada were begun during the 1960s by Pacific Western Airlines.

On 1 June 2015, First Air began their codeshare flights with Calm Air ending their Kivalliq Regional Flights from Rankin Inlet to Arviat, Baker Lake, Coral Harbour, Repulse Bay, Whale Cove, and Chesterfield Inlet.

Logo circa 2005, introduced in the 1990s used until 2017

In 2016, First Air/Bradley Air Services became the oldest airline in Canada still operating under its original name.

On 28 September 2018, Makivik Corporation and the Inuvialuit Corporate Group (ICG) signed a definitive agreement to merge Canadian North and First Air, awaiting government approval. The new airline would use the new First Air livery, but would operate under the name Canadian North. On 19 June 2019, the federal government gave approval to the merger provided several terms and conditions were met.

On 2 October 2018 First Air hired Chris Avery as the new CEO of First Air. He became the CEO of Canadian North after the merger was completed.

On 1 November 2019, First Air and Canadian North completed the merger and combined schedules. Operations were under the Canadian North name using the First Air branding. However, full integration was expected to take 12 to 18 months.

== Destinations ==
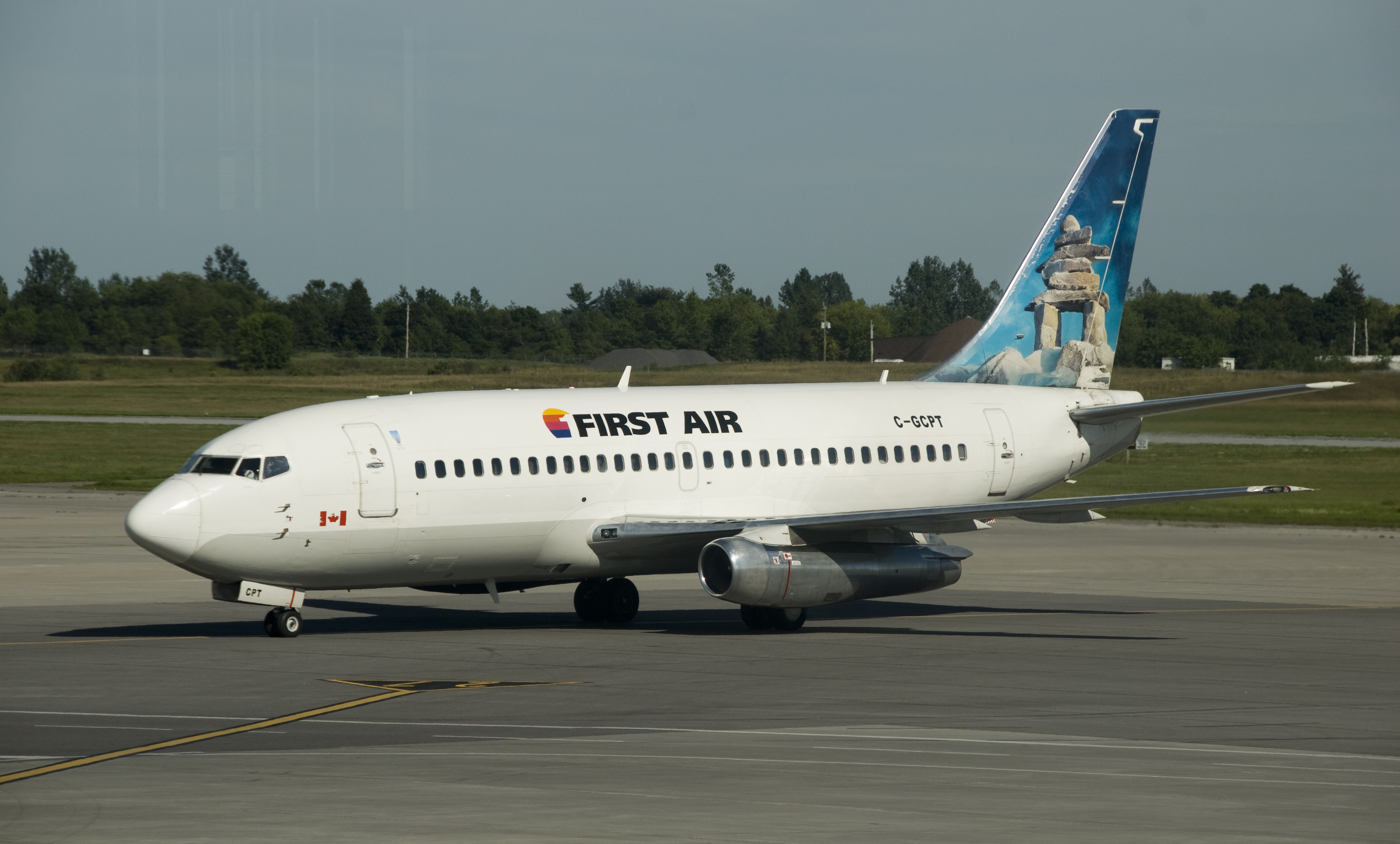
First Air Boeing 737-200 at Ottawa Macdonald–Cartier International Airport

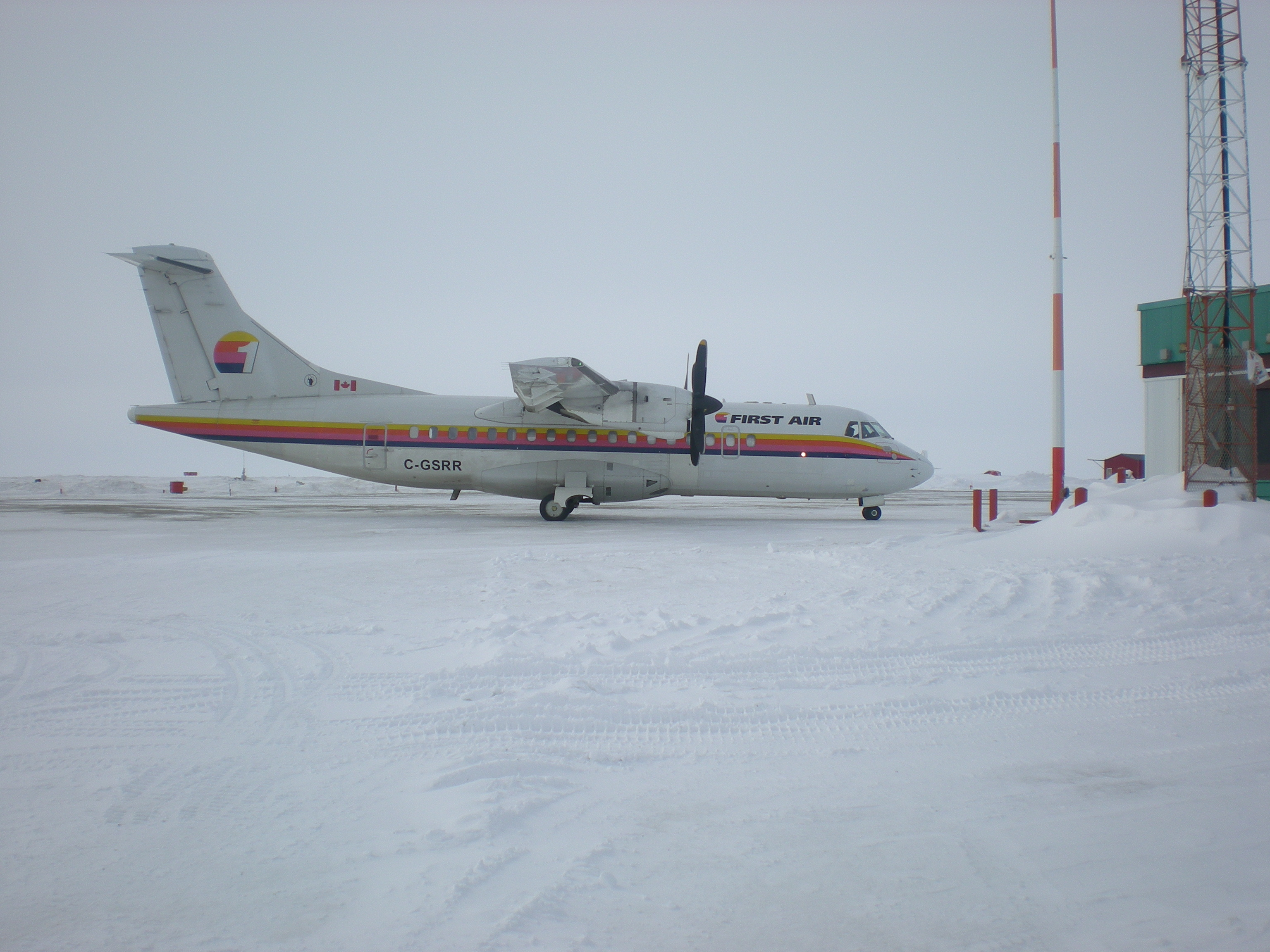
ATR 42 at Cambridge Bay Airport, older livery

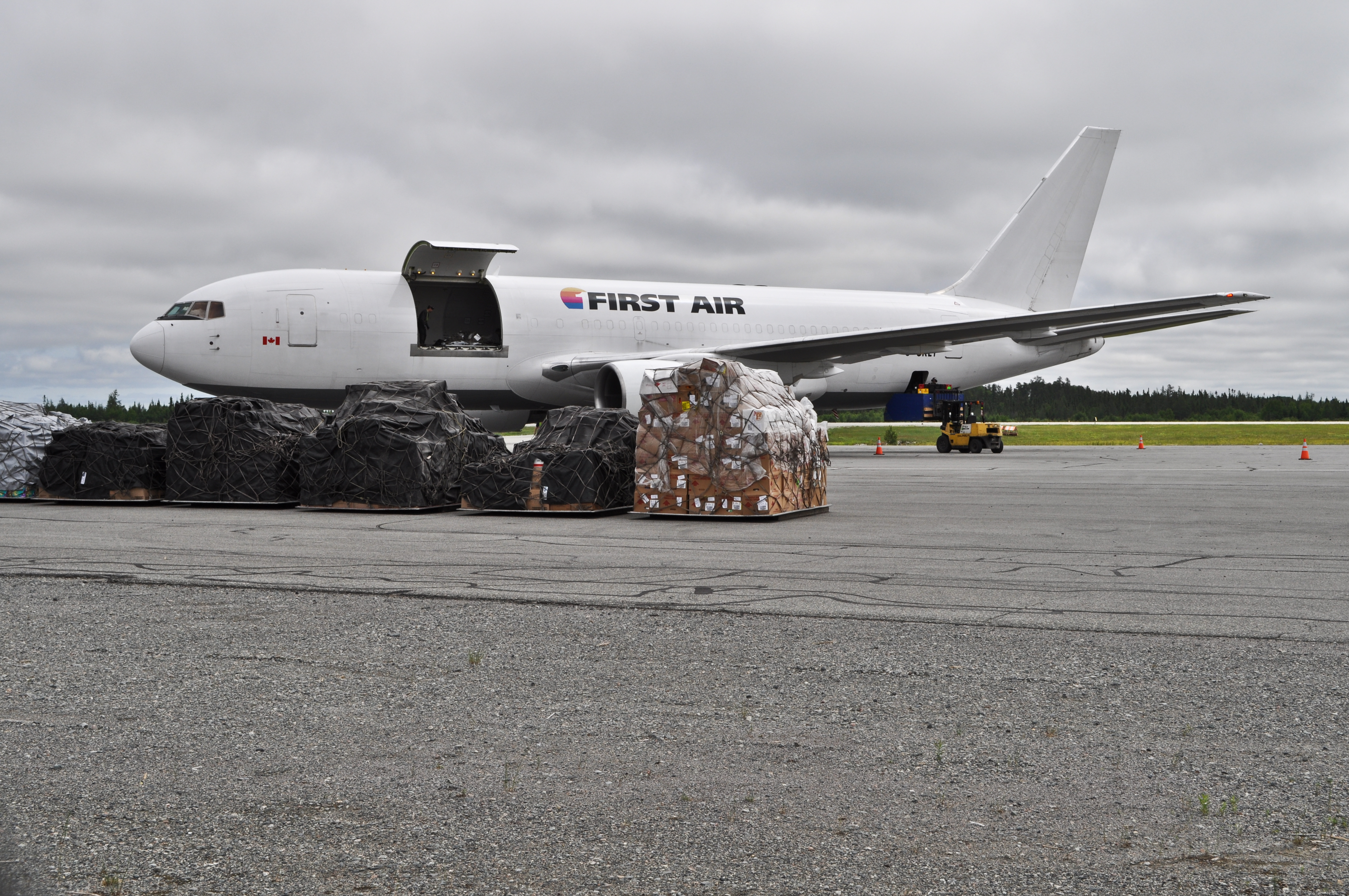
First Air Boeing 767 at Val-d'Or Airport, Quebec

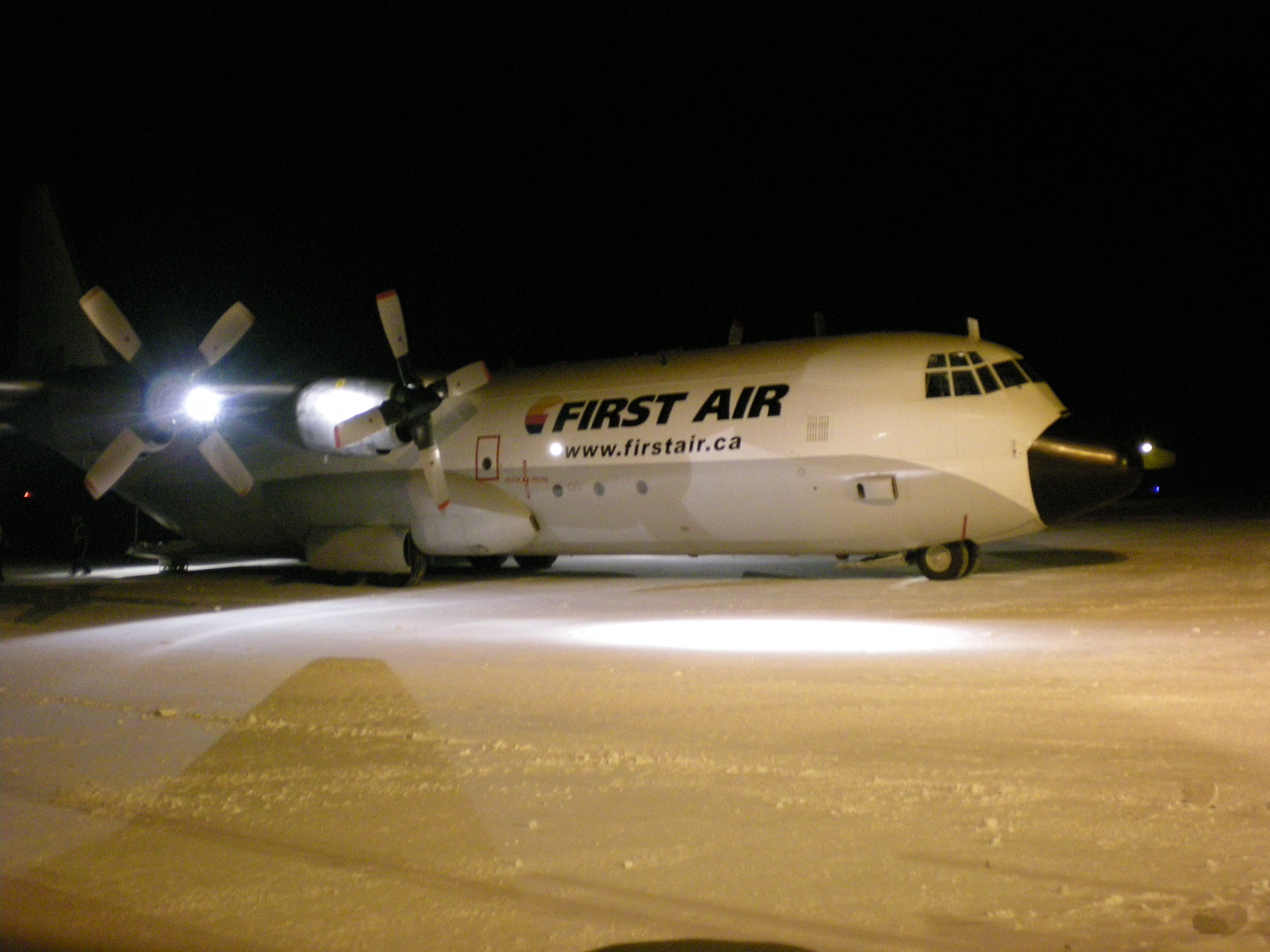
First Air L-382G

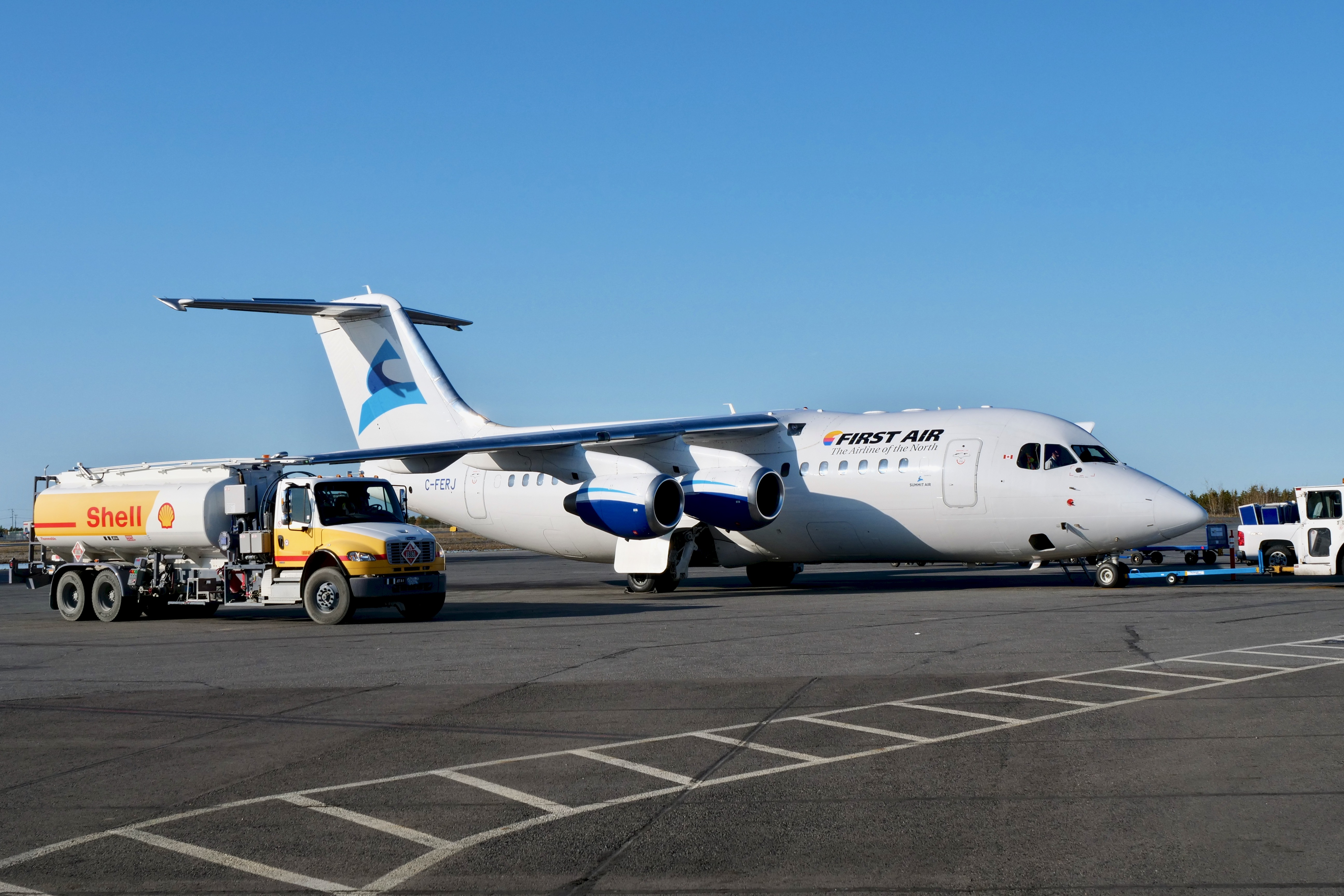
Summit Air Avro RJ85 operating for First Air

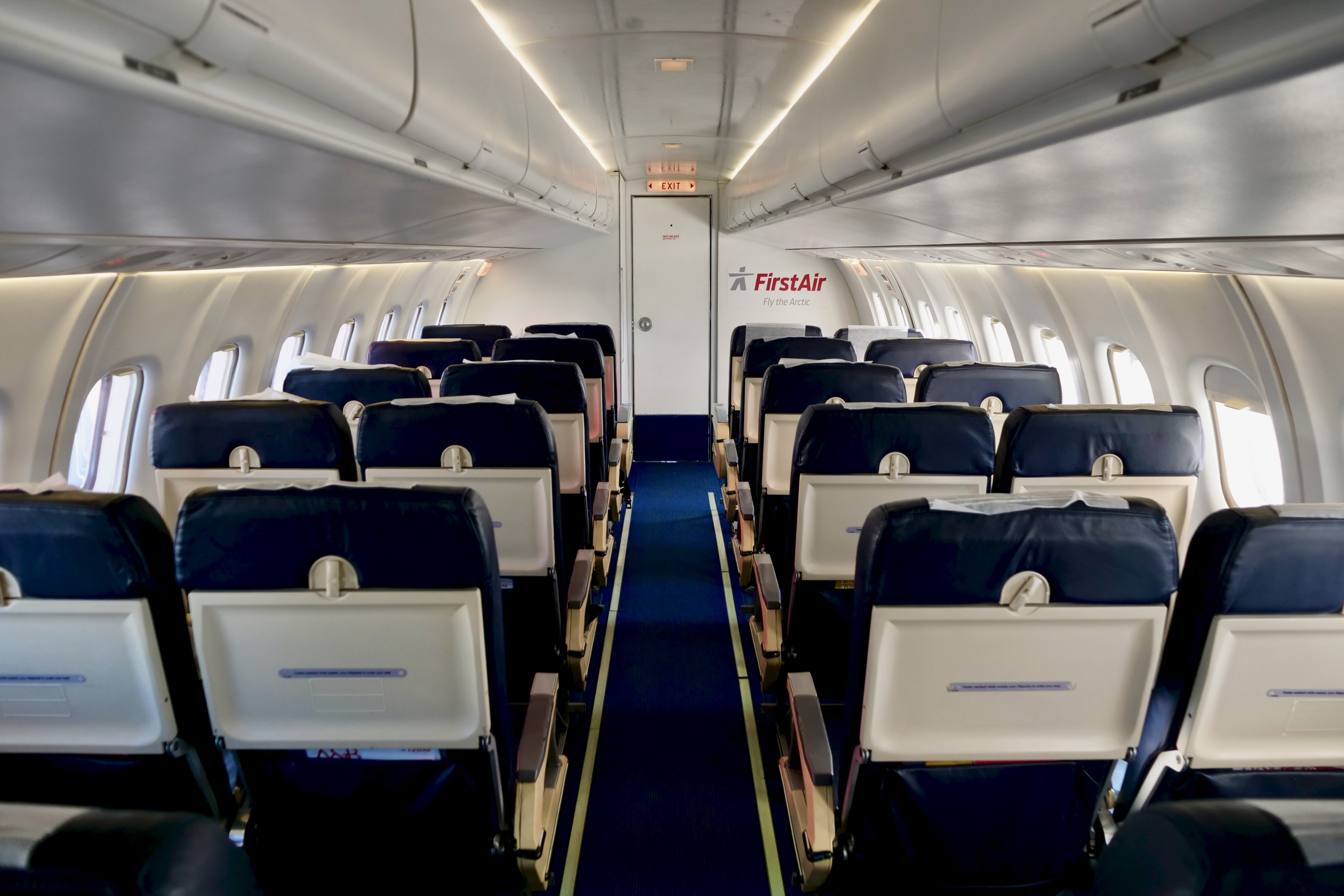
First Air ATR-42 cabin

First Air operates scheduled services to these domestic destinations in Canada:

City	Province	IATA	ICAO	Airport	Notes
Arctic Bay	Nunavut	YAB	CYAB	Arctic Bay Airport	
Arviat	Nunavut	YEK	CYEK	Arviat Airport	Codeshare with Calm Air
Baker Lake	Nunavut	YBK	CYBK	Baker Lake Airport	Codeshare with Calm Air
Cambridge Bay	Nunavut	YCB	CYCB	Cambridge Bay Airport	
Cape Dorset	Nunavut	YTE	CYTE	Cape Dorset Airport	
Chesterfield Inlet	Nunavut	YCS	CYCS	Chesterfield Inlet Airport	Codeshare with Calm Air
Churchill	Manitoba	YYQ	CYYQ	Churchill Airport	Codeshare with Calm Air
Clyde River	Nunavut	YCY	CYCY	Clyde River Airport	
Coral Harbour	Nunavut	YZS	CYZS	Coral Harbour Airport	Codeshare with Calm Air
Edmonton	Alberta	YEG	CYEG	Edmonton International Airport	
Fort Simpson	Northwest Territories	YFS	CYFS	Fort Simpson Airport	
Gjoa Haven	Nunavut	YHK	CYHK	Gjoa Haven Airport	
Hall Beach	Nunavut	YUX	CYUX	Hall Beach Airport	
Hay River	Northwest Territories	YHY	CYHY	Hay River/Merlyn Carter Airport	
Igloolik	Nunavut	YGT	CYGT	Igloolik Airport	
Inuvik	Northwest Territories	YEV	CYEV	Inuvik (Mike Zubko) Airport	
Iqaluit	Nunavut	YFB	CYFB	Iqaluit Airport	Hub
Kimmirut	Nunavut	YLC	CYLC	Kimmirut Airport	
Kugaaruk	Nunavut	YBB	CYBB	Kugaaruk Airport	
Kugluktuk	Nunavut	YCO	CYCO	Kugluktuk Airport	
Kuujjuaq	Quebec	YVP	CYVP	Kuujjuaq Airport	
Montréal	Quebec	YUL	CYUL	Montréal–Pierre Elliott Trudeau International Airport	
Naujaat	Nunavut	YUT	CYUT	Naujaat Airport	Codeshare with Calm Air
Ottawa	Ontario	YOW	CYOW	Ottawa Macdonald–Cartier International Airport	Main Base/Cargo Hub/ Maintenance Base
Pangnirtung	Nunavut	YXP	CYXP	Pangnirtung Airport	
Pond Inlet	Nunavut	YIO	CYIO	Pond Inlet Airport	
Qikiqtarjuaq	Nunavut	YVM	CYVM	Qikiqtarjuaq Airport	
Rankin Inlet	Nunavut	YRT	CYRT	Rankin Inlet Airport	Hub
Resolute	Nunavut	YRB	CYRB	Resolute Bay Airport	
Taloyoak	Nunavut	YYH	CYYH	Taloyoak Airport	
Ulukhaktok	Northwest Territories	YHI	CYHI	Ulukhaktok/Holman Airport	
Whale Cove	Nunavut	YXN	CYXN	Whale Cove Airport	Codeshare with Calm Air
Whitehorse	Yukon	YXY	CYXY	Erik Nielsen Whitehorse International Airport	Codeshare with Air North
Winnipeg	Manitoba	YWG	CYWG	Winnipeg James Armstrong Richardson International Airport	Codeshare with Calm Air
Yellowknife	Northwest Territories	YZF	CYZF	Yellowknife Airport	Hub

According to the Official Airline Guide (OAG), First Air operated scheduled passenger service from the mid-1980s to the early 1990s nonstop between Ottawa (YOW) and Boston (BOS) primarily with Hawker Siddeley HS 748 turboprops, but also with Boeing 727-100 Combi jetliners as well. This was the only scheduled passenger service ever operated to the U.S. by First Air.

=== Codeshare agreements ===
First Air had codeshare agreements with the following airlines:

- Air Greenland
- Air North
- Calm Air
- Canadian North (ended 16 May 2017)

== Fleet ==
As of January 2022, Bradley Air Services had 31 aircraft registered with Transport Canada. All aircraft are operated as Canadian North

=== Retired fleet ===
First Air previously operated the following aircraft types:

- Boeing 727-100 (combi)
- Boeing 727-200 (combi and freighter)
- Boeing 737-200 (combi and freighter)
- Boeing 767-200 (freighter)
- de Havilland Canada DHC-6 Twin Otter (STOL capable aircraft)
- Douglas DC-3
- Hawker Siddeley HS 748 (combi)
- Lockheed L-100 Hercules (freighter)
- ATR 72-202 (combi)

== Accidents and incidents ==
Five of ten incidents had fatalities.

- 28 January 1974, a Douglas C-47B CF-TVK, a de Havilland Canada DHC-6 CF-DIJ, and de Havilland Canada DHC-3 CF-OHD of Bradley Air Services were destroyed in a hangar fire at Carp Airport, Ottawa.
- 23 August 1978, a de Havilland Canada DHC-6 C-FQDG of Bradley Air Services was destroyed on final approach to Frobisher Bay (now Iqaluit), Northwest Territories. One of two crew died and all four passengers survived.
- 29 August 1979, a de Havilland Canada DHC-6 C-GROW of Bradley Air Services was destroyed when plane crash on approach and short of the runway at Frobisher Bay (now Iqaluit), Northwest Territories. Two crew and seven passengers perished in crash.
- 15 March 1981, a de Havilland Canada DHC-6 C-FDHT of Bradley Air Services sunk through polar ice near Nord, Greenland.
- 15 September 1988, a Hawker Siddeley HS 748 C-GFFA of Bradley Air Services was destroyed in a crash near Hammond, Ontario as it was approaching into Ottawa International Airport. Both crew on board perished.
- 12 January 1989, a Hawker Siddeley HS 748 C-GDOV of Bradley Air Services was destroyed in a crash near Dayton, Ohio killing both crew members.
- 12 August 1996, a de Havilland Canada DHC-6 C-GNDN of First Air was destroyed near Markham Bay, Northwest Territories. Both crew members perished.
- 3 December 1998, a Hawker Siddeley HS 748 C-FBNW of Bradley Air Services was damaged beyond repair while attempting take-off at Iqaluit, Northwest Territories. Crew of four and three passengers survived.
- 22 May 2001, a Boeing 737-210C C-GNWI of First Air was damaged beyond repair after landing in Yellowknife, Northwest Territories. All 98 passenger and 6 crew survived.
- 20 August 2011, Flight 6560, a First Air Boeing 737-210C (C-GNWN) flying a charter flight crashed en route from Yellowknife on final approach to Resolute, killing 12 and injuring 3 others.

== See also ==
- Above&Beyond
- List of defunct airlines of Canada
