= Bylot =

Bylot may refer to:

== Places ==
- Bylot Island, Nunavut, Canada, named after explorer Robert Bylot
- Bylot, Manitoba
  - Bylot railway station
- Bylot Sound, also called North Star Bay, in Wolstenholme Fjord, Greenland

== People ==
- Robert Bylot, 17th-century explorer in the Canadian Arctic region
