= Imiqqutailaqtuuq Islands =

Island group in Nunavut, Canada

- Location within Nunavut Location within Canada

Geography
- Location: Roes Welcome Sound
- Coordinates: 65°56′N 86°11′W

Administration
- Canada
- Nunavut: Nunavut
- Region: Qikiqtaaluk

Demographics
- Population: Uninhabited

The uninhabited Imiqqutailaqtuuq Islands are located in Roes Welcome Sound, closer to the mainland than Southampton Island. The island group is a part of the Qikiqtaaluk Region, in the Canadian territory of Nunavut.
