= Madeleine Isserkut Kringayak =

Canadian Inuk sculptor and jewelry artist

Madeleine Isserkut Kringayak (ᐃᓯᑯ) (1928–1984), was a Canadian Inuk sculptor and jewelry artist.

Her sculptures were carved primarily from natural materials such as soapstone (steatite), bone, and antler, reflecting the hunting habits and daily life of her family and the Inuit at large.

Born in 1928 to carver Apollina Nobvak (1906–1965), she married fellow carver Nicholas Kringayark in 1942. Their daughters, Martha Ulliyak Milortok (born 1944) and Simona Kringayark are also practicing carvers.

A pioneering carver in the Repulse Bay, Northwest Territories (now Naujaat, Nunavut) community, Isserkut's work has been featured in at least 25 different exhibitions at a variety of institutions including the Montreal Museum of Fine Arts, the Winnipeg Art Gallery, the Hamilton Art Gallery, and the Department of Indian Affairs and Northern Development, among others. In 1979, one of her soapstone sculptures was featured in the third Canada Post Inuit series of stamps. This series also included fellow Repulse Bay artist, Jean Mapsalak, on the 17 cent Canadian stamp.

Her work is included in the permanent collection of the National Gallery of Canada.
