= Carp Airport =

Ottawa/Carp Airport
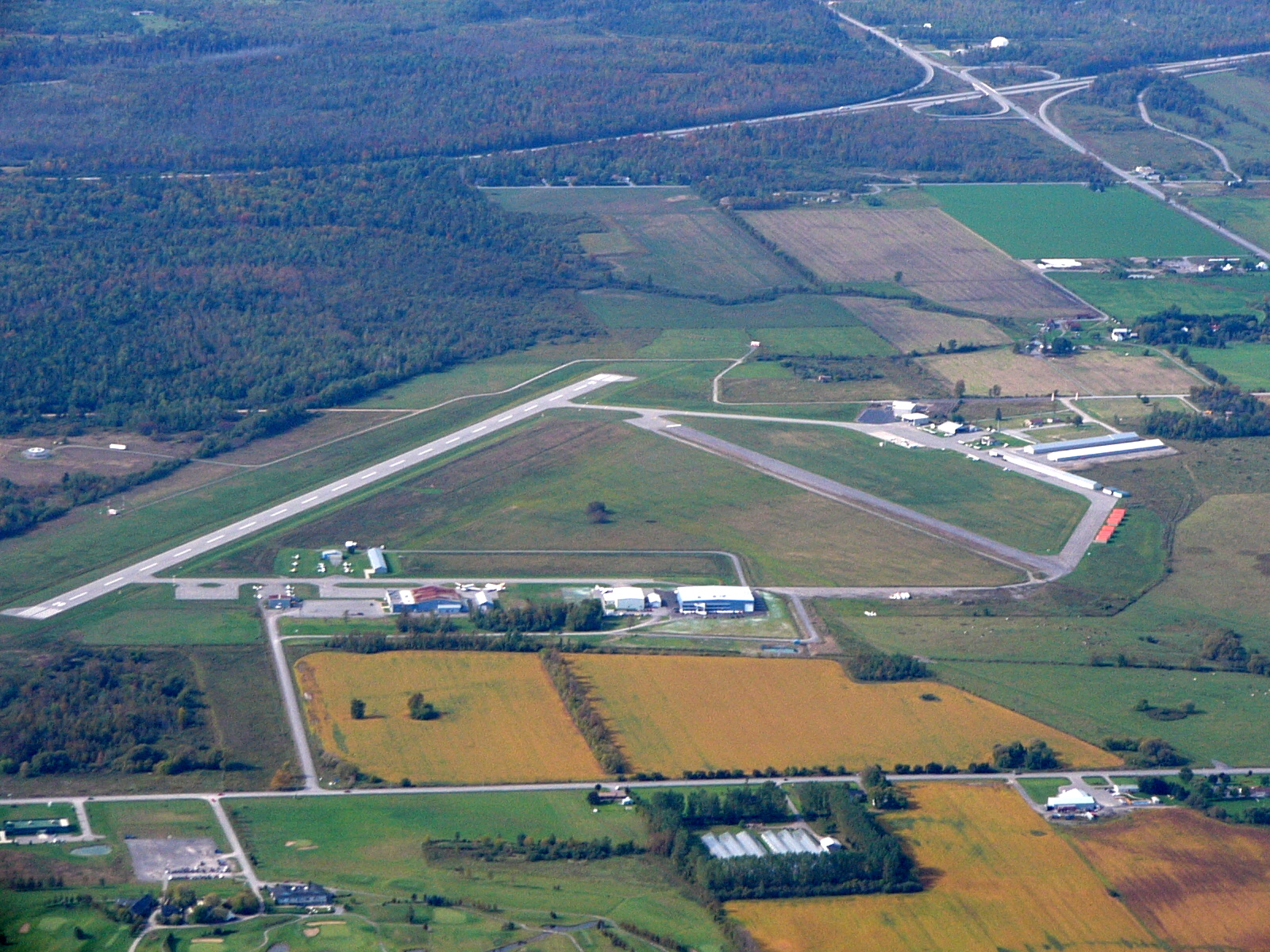
- IATA: none; ICAO: CYRP

Summary
- Airport type: Public
- Owner/Operator: West Capital Developments
- Location: Carp, Ontario
- Time zone: EST (UTC−05:00)
  - Summer (DST): EDT (UTC−04:00)
- Elevation AMSL: 384 ft / 117 m
- Coordinates: 45°19′21″N 076°01′20″W
- Website: www.carpairport.ca

Map
- Location in Ottawa CYRP (Ontario) CYRP (Canada)

Runways
Direction	Length		Surface
Direction	ft	m	Surface
10/28	3,936	1,200	Asphalt
04/22	2,205	672	Gravel
- Source: Canada Flight Supplement

Ottawa/Carp Airport or Carp Airport (ICAO: CYRP) is located 1.2 nautical miles (2.2 km; 1.4 mi) south of Carp, Ontario, Canada, a small village that is now part of Ottawa. Carp is the only airport in the Ottawa area where private hangar space is readily available, so it is a popular home base for local general aviation pilots.

The airport had been owned by the city of Ottawa until 2005 but was transferred to a private company, West Capital Developments, who plan to build an airport community and industrial park at the airport.

== History ==
RCAF Detachment Carp was constructed as a relief landing field for No.2 Service Flying Training School at RCAF Station Uplands, as part of the British Commonwealth Air Training Plan during World War II. The outline of the characteristic three-runway triangle is still visible in the shape of the taxiways, but one of the runways has disappeared, and another (04/22) is gravel-covered and restricted to visual flight rules (VFR) only. Near the airport is CFS Carp, the largest of the Canadian Cold War Emergency Government Headquarters (nicknamed the Diefenbunker), a giant long-term fallout shelter for government and military officials that now serves as a museum.

== Tenants ==
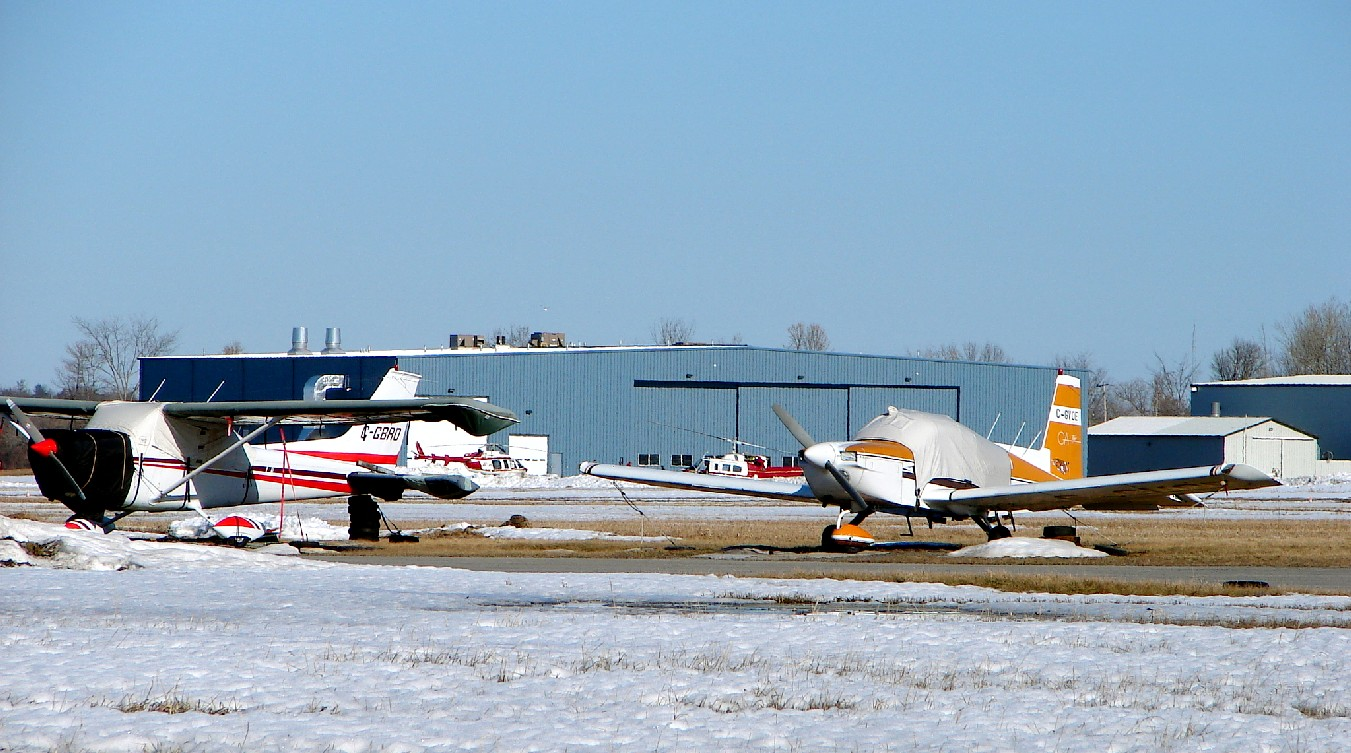
Ottawa/Carp Airport ramp

=== Former ===
Besides the RCAF, Carp was home to First Air (formerly Bradley Air Services), which at one time had its turboprop maintenance facility and head office at this airport.

=== Current ===
Carp is the home of Helicopter Transport Services and Experimental Aircraft Association (EAA) Chapter 245.

== Accidents and incidents ==
- On 28 January 1974, Douglas C-47B CF-TVK of Bradley Air Services, now First Air, was destroyed in a hangar fire.
- On 16 June 2006, BD-5J jet C-GBDV piloted by Scott Manning, crashed during a Friday practice session for the 2006 Carp Airshow after an incorrectly installed right flap deployed during a low pass, leading to an uncontrollable right roll and crash just beyond the end of runway 10. The pilot was killed.
- On 10 February 2021, a Blackshape BS100 performing circuits crashed at the airport, killing the pilot. The pilot reported an engine failure while climbing from runway 28, causing the aircraft to crash about 240 m (790 ft) south of the runway.

== See also ==
- List of airports in the Ottawa area.
