= Above&Beyond (magazine) =

Canadian magazine

above&beyond
- Categories: Lifestyle
- Frequency: 6 times a year
- Circulation: 250,000
- Founded: 1988
- First issue: January 1989
- Country: Canada
- Language: English
- Website: above&beyond

above&beyond, which runs under the byline "Canada's Arctic Journal", is a Canadian magazine that features northern-related lifestyle and news features. Published six times a year, the publication is also the official in-flight magazine of First Air.

== History and profile ==
above&beyond was established in 1988. The first issue of the magazine appeared in January 1989, It has focused on various facets of northern life, including its wildlife, people, social situation, and unique geography.
