= Cecilia Angmadlok Angutialuk =

Inuk artist

- Born: 1938 (age 87–88); Repulse Bay, Northwest Territories
- Known for: stone sculptures

Cecilia Angmadlok Angutialuk (born 1938) is a Canadian Inuk artist known for her stone sculpture. Angutialuk was born in Repulse Bay, Northwest Territories, (now Naujaat, Nunavut), where she continues to live.

Her work is included in the collections of the Musée national des beaux-arts du Québec, the National Gallery of Canada, the Winnipeg Art Gallery, and Feheley Fine Arts.
