= Robert Bylot =

English explorer

Robert Bylot (fl. 1610–1616) was an English explorer who made four voyages to the Arctic. He was uneducated and from a working-class background, but was able to rise to rank of master in the English Royal Navy.

== Voyages ==
=== Robert Bylot ===
==== First voyage, 1610–1611 ====
Bylot was first mate on Discovery during Henry Hudson's 1610–1611 expedition into what is now known as Hudson Bay. In the spring of 1611, Hudson wanted to continue the expedition, but the crew wanted to return home. There was discontent between the captain and members of the crew, and was stripped of his rank.

Later there was a mutiny in which Hudson, his son and several sailors were set adrift in an open boat in James Bay. It was due to Bylot's navigational skills that Discovery was able to return from the Arctic safely; Hudson and his party were never seen again. Upon return to England, Bylot was tried as a mutineer but was pardoned.

==== Second voyage, 1612–1613 ====
Bylot returned to Hudson Bay in 1612 with Sir Thomas Button. They wintered over at the mouth of the Nelson River, and in the spring of 1613, continued north. They were able to reach 65th parallel north, then returned to England.

=== Northwest Passage ===
==== First voyage, 1615 ====
In 1615, the Muscovy Company hired Bylot to find the Northwest Passage as captain of Discovery. William Baffin was the pilot. They sailed west from Hudson Strait and were blocked by ice at Frozen Strait.

==== Second voyage, 1616 ====
The following year, the Muscovy Company again hired Bylot and Baffin to continue to search for the Northwest Passage. The voyage resulted in several notable achievements. First was the circumnavigation and mapping of what is now called Baffin Bay. Second was the discovery of Smith Sound, by which the North Pole would eventually be reached. Third was the discovery of Lancaster Sound, through which the Northwest Passage would eventually be found three centuries later.

== Legacy ==
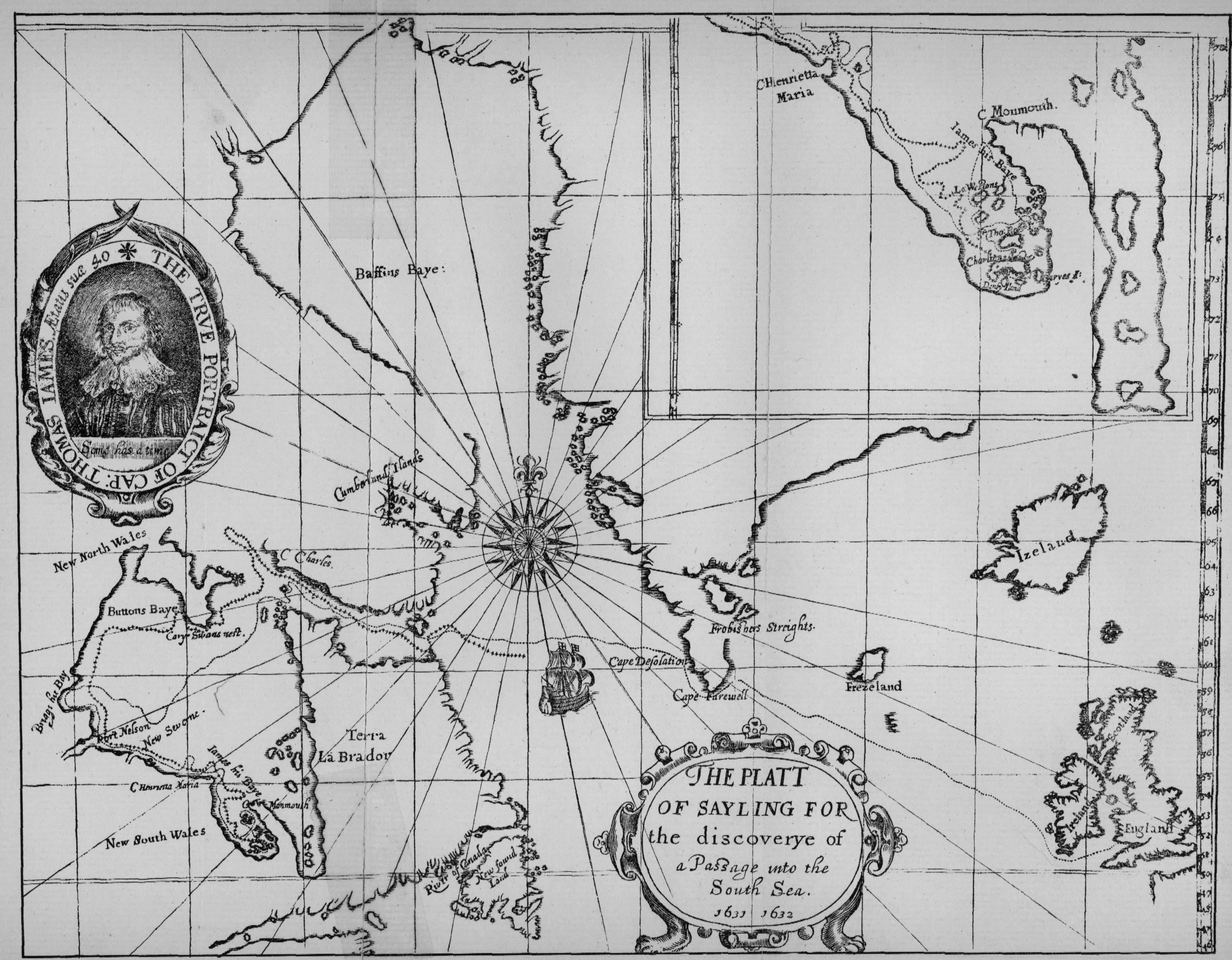
a map of the voyage undertaken by Thomas James in 1631–1632, showing clearly the approximate shape and size of Baffin Bay based on Bylot's voyage. The geographic features, including the approximate location of Lancaster Sound, are broadly accurate.

Bylot and Baffin's work in Baffin Bay was doubted by cartographers back in England. As late as 1812, some charts of the area only showed a dotted bulge with the words: "Baffin's Bay according to the relation of W. Baffin in 1616, but not now believed."

When the bay was "rediscovered" by Sir John Ross in 1818, the records of the Bylot–Baffin voyage proved extremely accurate. In England, almost total credit for the discovery was given to Baffin, and Bylot was virtually ignored. Historian Farley Mowat speculated two possible reasons for this: Bylot's lack of education and lower position relative to Baffin in English society, and his involvement in the mutiny during Hudson's expedition.

Bylot Island, off the northern end of Baffin Island and one of the more dramatic of the Canadian Arctic islands, was named after him.
