= Frozen Strait =

Strait in Nunavut, Canada

- Frozen Strait connects Roes Welcome Sound to Foxe Basin, with Naujaat in the north Frozen Strait (Canada)
- Location: Kivalliq Region, Nunavut, Canada
- Coordinates: 65°45′N 84°20′W
- Ocean/sea sources: Arctic Ocean
- Max. length: 80 km (50 mi)
- Max. width: 19 to 32 km (12 to 20 mi)
- Settlements: Naujaat

Frozen Strait is a waterway in Nunavut just north of Hudson Bay between the Melville Peninsula to the north and Southampton Island to the south. It connects Roes Welcome Sound in the west, passing Naujaat in the north (earlier known as Repulse Bay), with Foxe Basin to the east. The strait is 80 km (50 mi) long, and 19 to 32 km (12 to 20 mi) wide.

In 1615 Robert Bylot was blocked by ice at its east end. In 1742 Christopher Middleton reached the west end. He sailed north through Roes Welcome Sound to Repulse Bay. Seeing the strait ice-filled in August, it seemed clear that there was no passage so he gave the names Frozen Strait and Repulse Bay. In 1821 William Edward Parry passed the strait with no difficulty. Some have suggested that bowhead whales appear to migrate in the spring and fall through Roes Welcome Sound, but the possibility of migration through Frozen Strait cannot be ruled out.

== See also ==
- Arctic oscillation
- Little Ice Age
