= Roes Welcome Sound =

Waterway in Nunavut, Canada

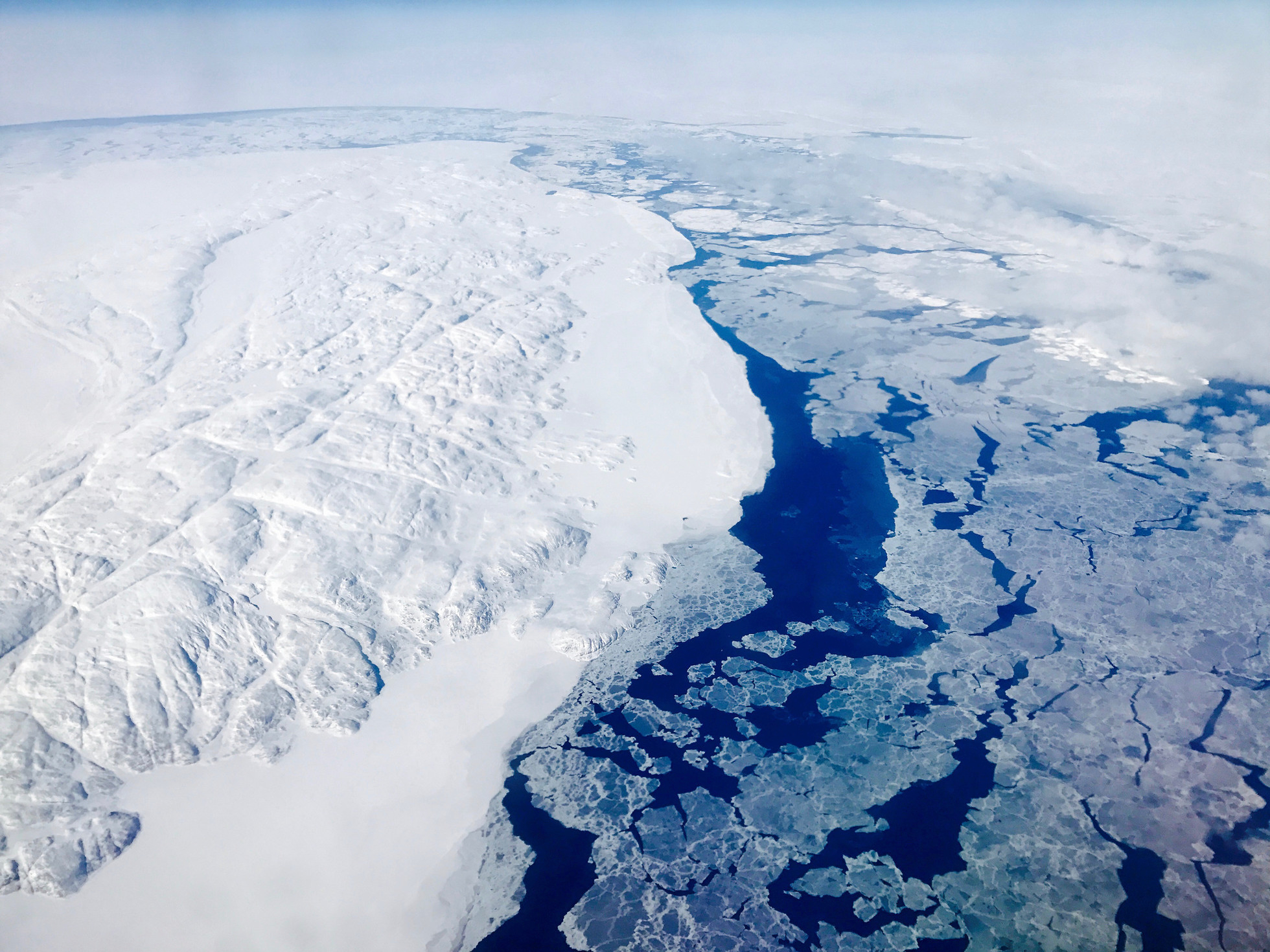
- The Roes Welcome Sound in 2017

- Location within Nunavut
- Coordinates: 65°01′N 086°40′W
- Basin countries: Canada
- Max. length: 290 km (180 mi)
- Max. width: 24 to 113 km (15 to 70 mi)
- Settlements: Uninhabited

Roes Welcome Sound is a long channel at the northwest end of Hudson Bay in the Kivalliq Region, Nunavut, Canada between the mainland on the west and Southampton Island on the east. It opens south into Hudson Bay. Its north end joins Repulse Bay which is connected east through Frozen Strait to Foxe Basin, thereby making Southampton Island an island. Wager Bay is a western branch. It is situated 200 km (120 mi) north of Marble Island. Roes Welcome Sound measures 290 km (180 mi) long, and 24 to 113 km (15 to 70 mi) wide.

In 1613 it was reached by Thomas Button who called it 'Ne Ultra'. It is named after Sir Thomas Roe, friend and sponsor of explorer Luke Foxe's 1631 Arctic voyage. Captain William Edward Parry, trying to find the Northwest Passage during his 1821 voyage, wrote:

On an inspection of the charts, I think it will also appear probable that a communication will one day be found to exist between this inlet (Prince Regent's) and Hudson's Bay, either through the broad and unexplored channel called Sir Thomas Roe's Welcome, or through Repulse Bay, which has not yet been satisfactorily examined.

— William Edward Parry, Arctic explorations and discoveries during the nineteenth century.

Roes Welcome Sound is a bowhead whale migratory path.

== Climate ==
Naujaat to the north has a tundra climate (Köppen ET) with short but cool summers and long, cold winters.

Climate data for Naujaat (Naujaat Airport) Climate ID: 2403490 ; coordinates 66°31′17″N 86°13′29″W; elevation: 22.9 m (75 ft); 1981–2010 normals
| Month | Jan | Feb | Mar | Apr | May | Jun | Jul | Aug | Sep | Oct | Nov | Dec | Year |
|---|---|---|---|---|---|---|---|---|---|---|---|---|---|
| Record high humidex | −4.6 | −11.6 | −2.1 | 2.4 | 7.9 | 21.1 | 29.3 | 21.9 | 15.4 | 4.2 | 0.4 | −1.0 | 29.3 |
| Record high °C (°F) | −1.7 (28.9) | −6.1 (21.0) | −1.5 (29.3) | 3.5 (38.3) | 8.0 (46.4) | 22.5 (72.5) | 28.0 (82.4) | 23.0 (73.4) | 15.5 (59.9) | 4.0 (39.2) | 0.0 (32.0) | 1.1 (34.0) | 28.0 (82.4) |
| Mean daily maximum °C (°F) | −27.5 (−17.5) | −27.5 (−17.5) | −22.1 (−7.8) | −12.6 (9.3) | −3.2 (26.2) | 6.4 (43.5) | 13.6 (56.5) | 10.7 (51.3) | 3.4 (38.1) | −3.7 (25.3) | −15.1 (4.8) | −21.4 (−6.5) | −8.2 (17.2) |
| Daily mean °C (°F) | −30.7 (−23.3) | −30.8 (−23.4) | −26.1 (−15.0) | −16.7 (1.9) | −6.5 (20.3) | 3.2 (37.8) | 9.1 (48.4) | 7.1 (44.8) | 1.1 (34.0) | −6.4 (20.5) | −18.7 (−1.7) | −25.0 (−13.0) | −11.7 (10.9) |
| Mean daily minimum °C (°F) | −33.6 (−28.5) | −33.8 (−28.8) | −30.0 (−22.0) | −20.9 (−5.6) | −9.7 (14.5) | −0.1 (31.8) | 4.7 (40.5) | 3.5 (38.3) | −1.3 (29.7) | −9.2 (15.4) | −22.2 (−8.0) | −28.5 (−19.3) | −15.1 (4.8) |
| Record low °C (°F) | −47.8 (−54.0) | −50.0 (−58.0) | −45.0 (−49.0) | −40.0 (−40.0) | −29.0 (−20.2) | −11.0 (12.2) | −1.0 (30.2) | −3.0 (26.6) | −11.5 (11.3) | −31.0 (−23.8) | −42.0 (−43.6) | −46.0 (−50.8) | −50.0 (−58.0) |
| Record low wind chill | −66.0 | −64 | −59 | −50 | −30 | −19 | 0 | −8 | −18 | −41 | −50 | −59 | −66 |
| Average precipitation mm (inches) | 22.1 (0.87) | 18.0 (0.71) | 21.6 (0.85) | 26.7 (1.05) | 18.6 (0.73) | 24.7 (0.97) | 31.1 (1.22) | 49.5 (1.95) | 36.0 (1.42) | 31.6 (1.24) | 27.6 (1.09) | 21.3 (0.84) | 328.7 (12.94) |
| Average rainfall mm (inches) | 0.0 (0.0) | 0.0 (0.0) | 0.0 (0.0) | 0.4 (0.02) | 2.5 (0.10) | 19.1 (0.75) | 31.1 (1.22) | 48.5 (1.91) | 25.2 (0.99) | 2.1 (0.08) | 0.0 (0.0) | 0.0 (0.0) | 128.9 (5.07) |
| Average snowfall cm (inches) | 22.5 (8.9) | 22.5 (8.9) | 25.0 (9.8) | 30.0 (11.8) | 19.4 (7.6) | 5.2 (2.0) | 0.0 (0.0) | 0.9 (0.4) | 12.1 (4.8) | 35.5 (14.0) | 31.7 (12.5) | 24.8 (9.8) | 229.5 (90.4) |
| Average precipitation days (≥ 0.2 mm) | 10.4 | 7.6 | 11.9 | 10.1 | 9.5 | 9.1 | 9.7 | 12.2 | 11.9 | 14.7 | 11.2 | 9.9 | 128.1 |
| Average rainy days (≥ 0.2 mm) | 0.0 | 0.0 | 0.0 | 0.22 | 1.1 | 7.4 | 9.7 | 12.1 | 7.8 | 0.89 | 0.0 | 0.1 | 39.1 |
| Average snowy days (≥ 0.2 cm) | 10.3 | 8.2 | 12.5 | 10.8 | 9.2 | 2.4 | 0.0 | 0.33 | 4.9 | 13.9 | 11.7 | 10.2 | 94.5 |
Source: Environment and Climate Change Canada Canadian Climate Normals 1991–2020 (Humidex and wind chill from Canadian Climate Normals 1981–2010)
