= Naujaat =

Repulse Bay ᓇᐅᔮᑦ
- Naujaat
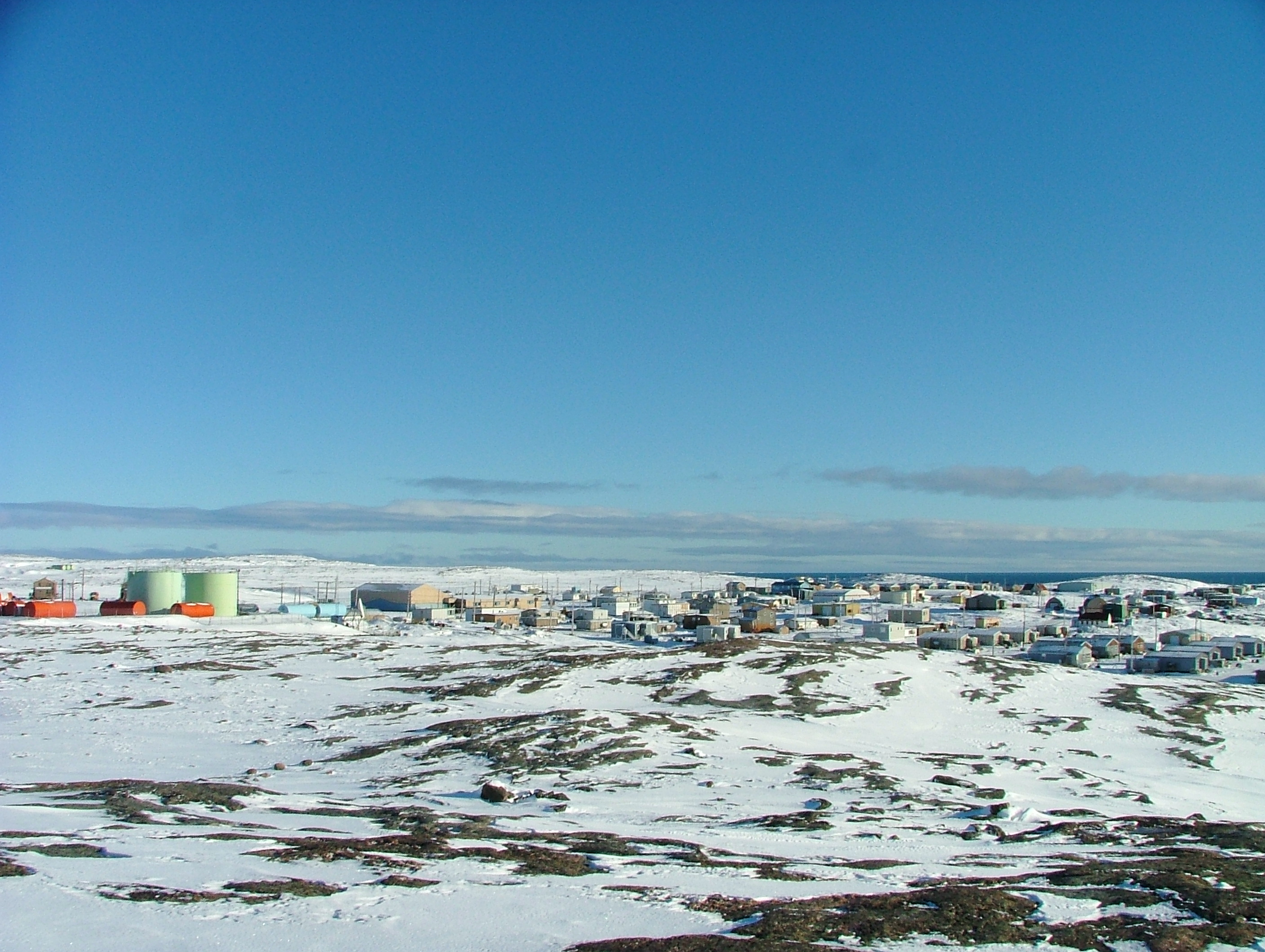
- Naujaat in October

- Location within Nunavut Location within Canada
- Coordinates: 66°32′N 086°15′W
- Country: Canada
- Territory: Nunavut
- Region: Kivalliq
- Electoral district: Aivilik

Government
  - Type: Hamlet Council
  - Mayor: Alan Robinson
  - MLA: Hannah Angootealuk

Area (2021)
  - Total: 406.19 km^{2} (156.83 sq mi)
- Elevation: 24 m (79 ft)

Population (2021)
  - Total: 1,225
  - Density: 3.016/km^{2} (7.811/sq mi)
- Time zone: UTC−06:00 (CST)
  - Summer (DST): UTC−05:00 (CDT)
- Canadian Postal code: X0C 0H0
- Area code: 867

Naujaat (Inuktitut: ᓇᐅᔮᑦ, lit. 'seagulls' nesting place'), officially known until 2 July 2015 as Repulse Bay, is an Inuit hamlet situated on the Arctic Circle. It is located on the shores of Hudson Bay, at the south end of the Melville Peninsula, in the Kivalliq Region of Nunavut, Canada.

== Location and wildlife ==
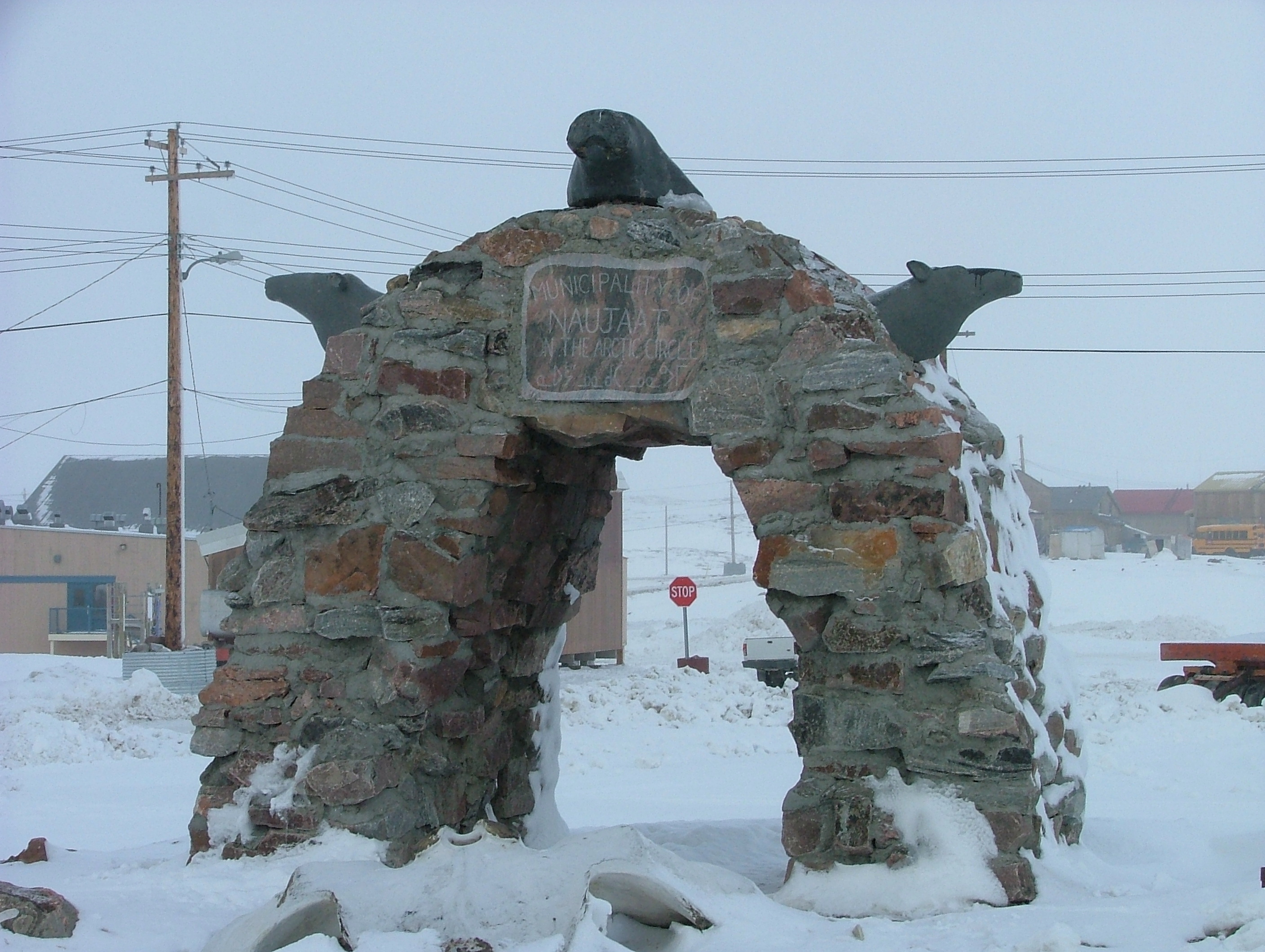
Arctic Circle arch

Naujaat is at the north end of Roes Welcome Sound, which separates Southampton Island from the mainland. On the east side of Naujaat Frozen Strait leads east to Foxe Channel. The hamlet is located exactly on the Arctic Circle, on the north shore of Naujaat and on the south shore of the Rae Isthmus. Transport to the community is provided primarily by air and by an annual sealift. Naujaat is home to a wide variety of animals including polar bears, caribou, seals, whales, and walrus. There are also approximately one hundred species of birds in the area, including gyrfalcons and peregrine falcons.

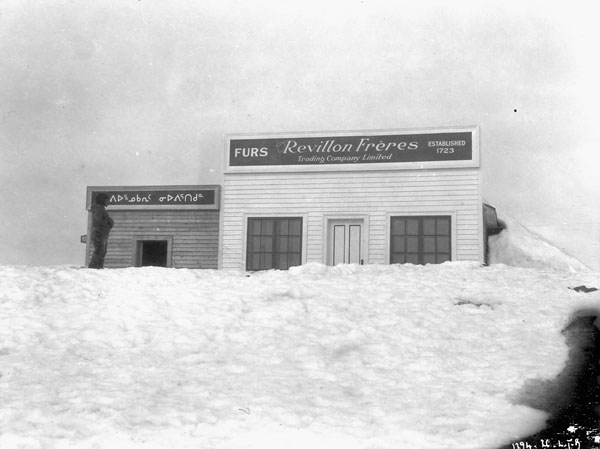
Revillon Frères post, Repulse Bay, 1926.

== History ==
Naujaat is translated into English variously as "seagull fledgling," "seagull resting place" or "seagulls' nesting place," named after a cliff 5 km (3.1 mi) to the north, where seagulls, migrating from the south each June, make their nests. Naujaat was first visited by Europeans in the 1740s, and by the late 1800s it became a popular whaling ground for American and Scottish whalers. Many Naujaat Inuit residents worked on board these whaling vessels from the south. Although there are various theories as to the origin of the English name "Repulse Bay," many attribute the name to Christopher Middleton, who when searching for the Northwest Passage in 1742 discovered that the bay was not a route out of Hudson Bay, but rather a cul-de-sac. He is claimed to have called it the "Bay of Repulse, the bay where I was pushed away". Others believe that the name comes from an 18th-century English vessel named Repulse (1759) which visited the area. The Hudson's Bay Company opened a post in Naujaat about 1916, and in 1923, a rival fur trading company, Revillon Frères, opened a post. A Roman Catholic Mission was built in 1932. Naujaat was formerly part of the District of Keewatin and the Keewatin Region; in 1999, the area became part of the Kivalliq Region.

On 12 May 2014, a by-election was held to elect a new mayor, which was won by Solomon Malliki. At the same time, a non-binding plebiscite was held to gauge how the community felt about restoring the traditional name, Naujaat. With voter turnout at 36%, there were 82 people in favour and 73 opposed to the name change. The name was officially changed on 2 July 2015.

== Naujaat today ==
The Naujaat community continues to rely on traditional sealing, fishing, hunting, trapping, and carving for their livelihood, together with tourism. Naujaat is known for its Inuit artists, especially carvers (typically creating small realist animal sculptures of ivory, soapstone, marble and antler), as well as jewellery and crafts. Its people are the 'Aivilingmiut'.

It is served by Naujaat Airport.

== Demographics ==
Federal census population history of Naujaat
Year	Pop.	±%
1976	265	—
1981	352	+32.8%
1986	420	+19.3%
1991	488	+16.2%
1996	559	+14.5%
2001	612	+9.5%
2006	748	+22.2%
2011	945	+26.3%
2016	1,082	+14.5%
2021	1,225	+13.2%
Source: Statistics Canada

In the 2021 Canadian census conducted by Statistics Canada, Naujaat had a population of 1,225 living in 223 of its 246 total private dwellings, a change of 13.2% from its 2016 population of 1,082. With a land area of 406.19 km^{2} (156.83 sq mi), it had a population density of 3.0/km^{2} (7.8/sq mi) in 2021.

== Broadband communications ==
Both Qiniq and NorthwesTel have operations in Naujaat. Since late 2018, Qiniq has offered 4G LTE and 2G-GSM technology for mobile users in Naujaat.

== Climate ==
Naujaat has a tundra climate (Köppen ET) with short but cool summers and long, cold winters.

Climate data for Naujaat (Naujaat Airport) Climate ID: 2403490 ; coordinates 66°31′17″N 86°13′29″W; elevation: 22.9 m (75 ft); 1981–2010 normals
Month	Jan	Feb	Mar	Apr	May	Jun	Jul	Aug	Sep	Oct	Nov	Dec	Year
Record high humidex	−4.6	−11.6	−2.1	2.4	7.9	21.1	29.3	21.9	15.4	4.2	0.4	−1.0	29.3
Record high °C (°F)	−1.7 (28.9)	−6.1 (21.0)	−1.5 (29.3)	3.5 (38.3)	8.0 (46.4)	22.5 (72.5)	28.0 (82.4)	23.0 (73.4)	15.5 (59.9)	4.0 (39.2)	0.0 (32.0)	1.1 (34.0)	28.0 (82.4)
Mean daily maximum °C (°F)	−27.5 (−17.5)	−27.5 (−17.5)	−22.1 (−7.8)	−12.6 (9.3)	−3.2 (26.2)	6.4 (43.5)	13.6 (56.5)	10.7 (51.3)	3.4 (38.1)	−3.7 (25.3)	−15.1 (4.8)	−21.4 (−6.5)	−8.2 (17.2)
Daily mean °C (°F)	−30.7 (−23.3)	−30.8 (−23.4)	−26.1 (−15.0)	−16.7 (1.9)	−6.5 (20.3)	3.2 (37.8)	9.1 (48.4)	7.1 (44.8)	1.1 (34.0)	−6.4 (20.5)	−18.7 (−1.7)	−25.0 (−13.0)	−11.7 (10.9)
Mean daily minimum °C (°F)	−33.6 (−28.5)	−33.8 (−28.8)	−30.0 (−22.0)	−20.9 (−5.6)	−9.7 (14.5)	−0.1 (31.8)	4.7 (40.5)	3.5 (38.3)	−1.3 (29.7)	−9.2 (15.4)	−22.2 (−8.0)	−28.5 (−19.3)	−15.1 (4.8)
Record low °C (°F)	−47.8 (−54.0)	−50.0 (−58.0)	−45.0 (−49.0)	−40.0 (−40.0)	−29.0 (−20.2)	−11.0 (12.2)	−1.0 (30.2)	−3.0 (26.6)	−11.5 (11.3)	−31.0 (−23.8)	−42.0 (−43.6)	−46.0 (−50.8)	−50.0 (−58.0)
Record low wind chill	−66.0	−64	−59	−50	−30	−19	0	−8	−18	−41	−50	−59	−66
Average precipitation mm (inches)	22.1 (0.87)	18.0 (0.71)	21.6 (0.85)	26.7 (1.05)	18.6 (0.73)	24.7 (0.97)	31.1 (1.22)	49.5 (1.95)	36.0 (1.42)	31.6 (1.24)	27.6 (1.09)	21.3 (0.84)	328.7 (12.94)
Average rainfall mm (inches)	0.0 (0.0)	0.0 (0.0)	0.0 (0.0)	0.4 (0.02)	2.5 (0.10)	19.1 (0.75)	31.1 (1.22)	48.5 (1.91)	25.2 (0.99)	2.1 (0.08)	0.0 (0.0)	0.0 (0.0)	128.9 (5.07)
Average snowfall cm (inches)	22.5 (8.9)	22.5 (8.9)	25.0 (9.8)	30.0 (11.8)	19.4 (7.6)	5.2 (2.0)	0.0 (0.0)	0.9 (0.4)	12.1 (4.8)	35.5 (14.0)	31.7 (12.5)	24.8 (9.8)	229.5 (90.4)
Average precipitation days (≥ 0.2 mm)	10.4	7.6	11.9	10.1	9.5	9.1	9.7	12.2	11.9	14.7	11.2	9.9	128.1
Average rainy days (≥ 0.2 mm)	0.0	0.0	0.0	0.22	1.1	7.4	9.7	12.1	7.8	0.89	0.0	0.1	39.1
Average snowy days (≥ 0.2 cm)	10.3	8.2	12.5	10.8	9.2	2.4	0.0	0.33	4.9	13.9	11.7	10.2	94.5
Source: Environment and Climate Change Canada Canadian Climate Normals 1991–2020 (Humidex and wind chill from Canadian Climate Normals 1981–2010)

== Notable people ==
- Cecilia Angmadlok Angutialuk (born 1938), artist and sculptor
- Jack Anawak (born 1950), politician
- Peter Irniq (born 1947), politician
- Madeleine Isserkut Kringayak (1928–1984), sculptor and jewelry artist
- Jose Kusugak (1950–2011), politician
- Michael Kusugak (born 1948), storyteller and children's writer
- Steve Mapsalak (1957–2025), politician

== See also ==
- List of municipalities in Nunavut
- Ukkusiksalik National Park
- Tuugaalik High School
