= Naujaat Airport =

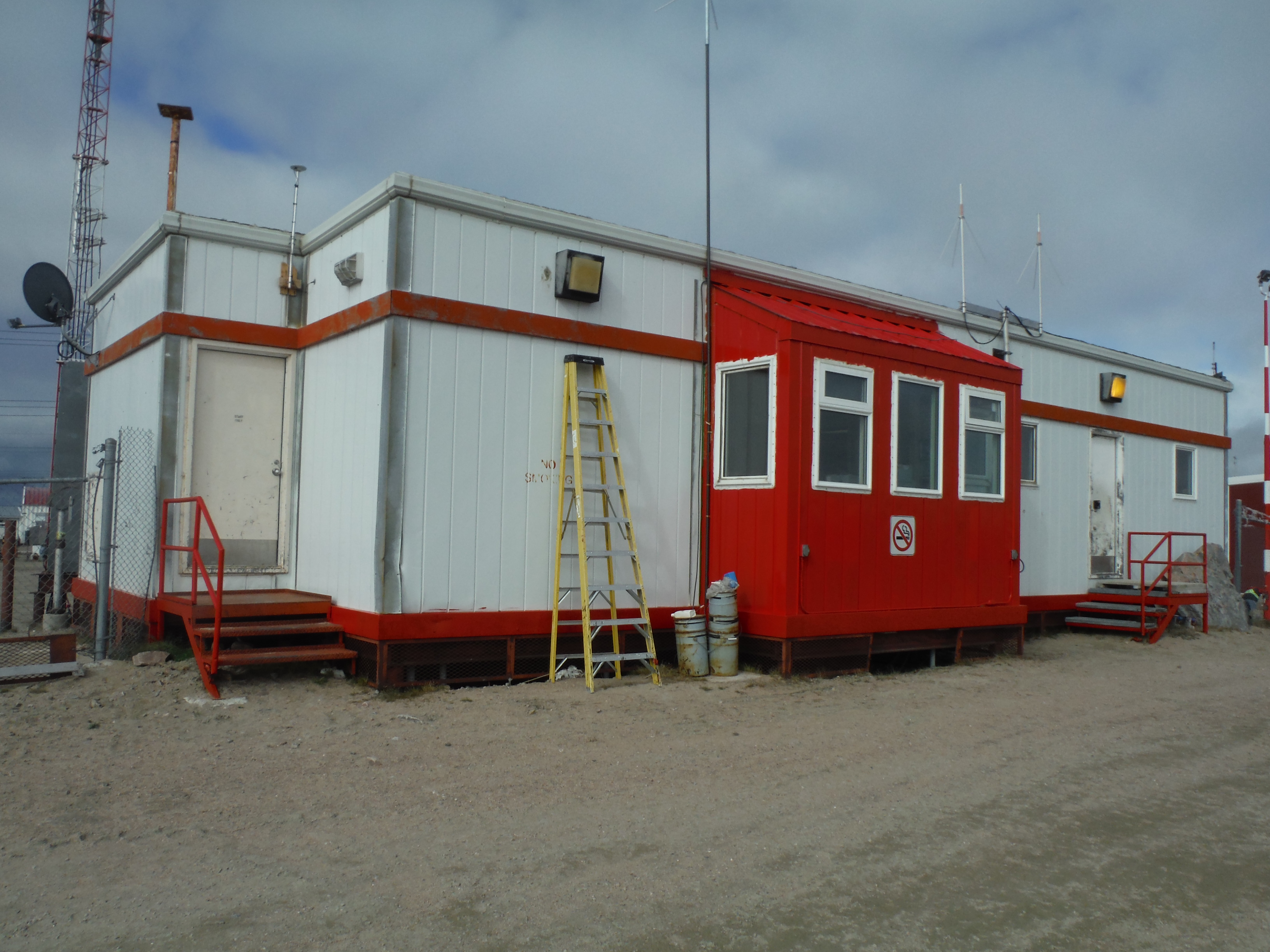
- IATA: YUT; ICAO: CYUT

Summary
- Airport type: Public
- Operator: Government of Nunavut
- Location: Naujaat, Nunavut
- Time zone: CST (UTC−06:00)
  - Summer (DST): CDT (UTC−05:00)
- Elevation AMSL: 75 ft / 23 m
- Coordinates: 66°31′14″N 086°13′29″W

Map
- Location in Nunavut

Runways
Direction	Length		Surface
Direction	ft	m	Surface
16/34	3,400	1,036	Gravel

Statistics (2010)
- Aircraft movements: 1,617
- Source: Canada Flight Supplement; Movements from Statistics Canada

Naujaat Airport, formerly Repulse Bay Airport (IATA: YUT, ICAO: CYUT), is located adjacent to Naujaat, Nunavut, Canada. A new air‑terminal building opened in June 2025, improving passenger‑processing capacity and accessibility for travellers.

== Airlines and destinations ==
Airlines	Destinations
Calm Air	Rankin Inlet
