= Territorial evolution of North America since 1763 =

Territorial evolution of North America of non-native nation states from 1750 to 2008

The 1763 Treaty of Paris ended the major war known by Americans as the French and Indian .War and by Canadians as the Seven Years' War / Guerre de Sept Ans, or by French-Canadians, La Guerre de la Conquête. It was signed by Great Britain, France and Spain, with Portugal in agreement. Preferring to keep Guadeloupe, France gave up Canada and all of its claims to territory east of the Mississippi River to Britain. With France out of North America this dramatically changed the European political scene on the continent.

At first only the imperial powers of Europe had the resources to support and expand settlements in North America. As time went on the colonies became more powerful and sought independence from the Old World. These demands for more autonomy sparked several wars, including the American Revolutionary War (1775–1783) and the Mexican War of Independence (1810–1821). The last major colonial power on the continent, the United Kingdom, granted dominion status to Canada in 1867 and slowly turned over its remaining land to that country over the next 100 years, with the last land transfer being the Dominion of Newfoundland in 1949. Throughout this period, France maintained the small North American territory of Saint Pierre and Miquelon off the coast of the island of Newfoundland.

From independence, the United States expanded rapidly to the west, acquiring the massive Louisiana territory in 1803 and fighting a war with Mexico to push west to the Pacific. At the same time, British settlement in Canada increased. US expansion was complicated by the division between "free" and "slave" states, which led to the Missouri Compromise of 1820. Likewise, Canada faced tensions between settlers, including French and English communities, and the colonial administration that led to the outbreak of civil strife in 1837. Mexico faced constant political tensions between liberals and conservatives, as well as the rebellion of the English-speaking region of Texas, which declared itself the Republic of Texas in 1836. In 1845, Texas joined the United States and in 1867 the United States acquired Alaska from Russia. The last major territorial change occurred when Newfoundland joined Canada in 1949, but there have been a number of small adjustments like the Boundary Treaty of 1970 where the city of Rio Rico, Texas, was ceded to Mexico.

== See also ==
- Territorial evolution of the United States
- Territorial evolution of Canada
- Territorial evolution of Mexico
- Territorial evolution of the Caribbean
- Animated map of North America
- Animated map of the Canada provinces evolution version 1
- Animated map of the Canada provinces evolution version 2
- Animated map of US states by date of statehood
- Animated map of Mexico

== Notes ==
- France is still listed as a nation in North America throughout its history because of their possession of the small islands Saint Pierre and Miquelon off the Canadian coast of Newfoundland (the island).
- Republic of Indian Stream (1832–1835) is represented on the map as the disputed territory between Maine and New Hampshire of the U.S. and Quebec and New Brunswick of Canada.
- Republic of Madawaska (1827) is represented on the map as the disputed territory between Maine (U.S.) and Canada. The area, known as Madawaska Valley, was transferred to Quebec in 1842, then transferred to New Brunswick at some point in the 1850s (see Mitchell maps of Canada-East of 1850 & 1860).
- Territories of a nation are represented by a lighter color than that for that nation's states or provinces.

== Before 1763 ==
See Territorial evolution of North America prior to 1763

== 1763 ==
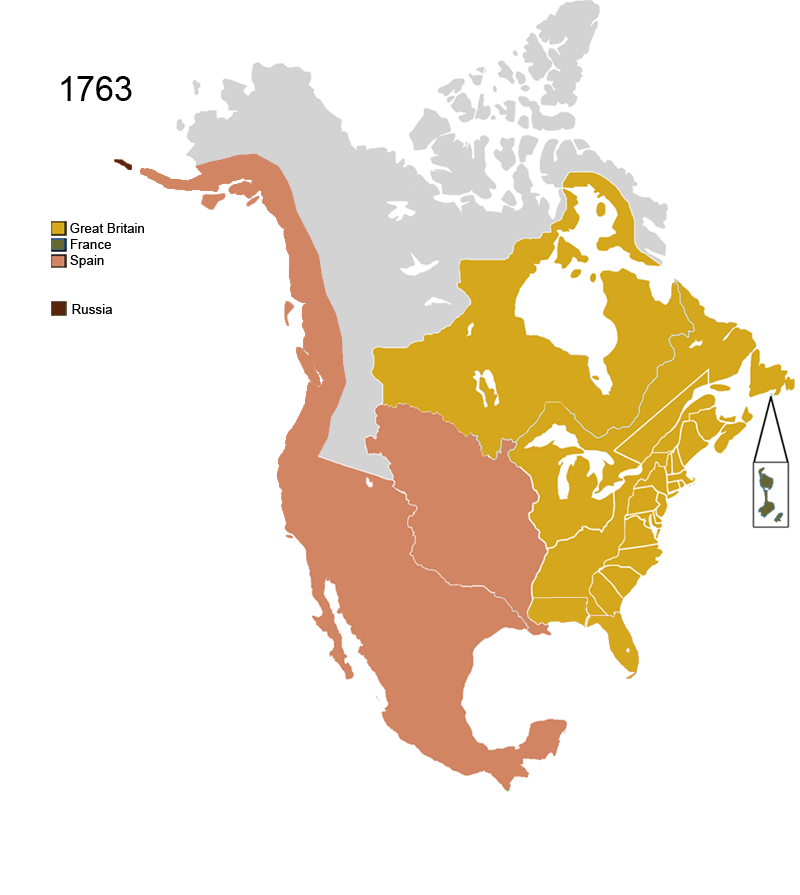

February 10, 1763

- The 1763 Treaty of Paris ended the French and Indian War/Seven Years' War. It was signed by Great Britain, France and Spain, with Portugal in agreement. Preferring to keep Guadeloupe, France gave up Canada and all of its claims to territory east of the Mississippi River to Britain.

his Most Christian Majesty cedes and guaranties to his said Britannick Majesty, in full right, Canada, with all its dependencies, as well as the island of Cape Breton, and all the other islands and coasts in the gulph and river of St. Lawrence, and in general, every thing that depends on the said countries, lands, islands, and coasts, with the sovereignty, property, possession, and all rights acquired by treaty, or otherwise, which the Most Christian King and the Crown of France have had until now over the said countries, lands, islands, places, coasts, and their inhabitants" – French King

- Spain ceded Florida to the British, but later received New Orleans and French Louisiana from them.

October 7, 1763

By the Royal Proclamation of 1763, King George III of Great Britain created the Province of Quebec in the St. Lawrence valley, the part of the former French province of Canada that was settled by people of French descent. The Great Lakes basin was barred to European settlement, reserved as exclusive “hunting grounds” for the “several nations or tribes of Indians” under the king's “protection.”

== 1774 ==
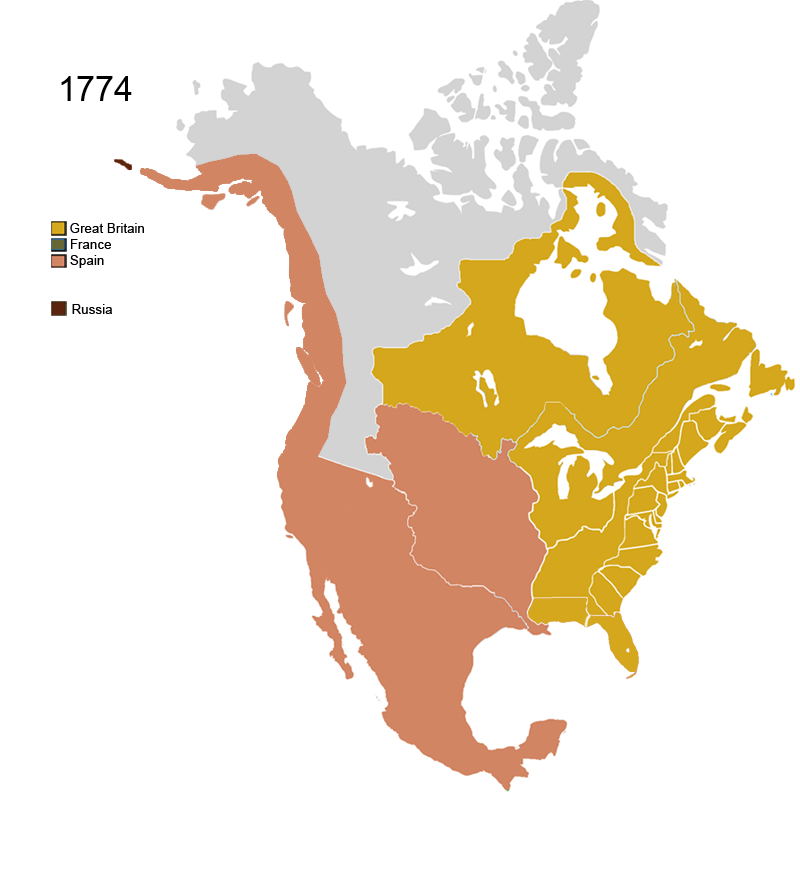

By the Quebec Act, the territory of the Province of Quebec was expanded to take over part of the Indian Reserve, including much of what is now southern Ontario, Illinois, Indiana, Michigan, Ohio, Wisconsin, and parts of Minnesota.

== 1775 ==
To ensure their claim on the Pacific coast the Spanish sent Bruno de Hezeta and Francisco Mourelle in the Santiago and Sonora sailed to what is now Vancouver Island and then south along the coast before continuing north as far as modern day Alaska.

== 1778 ==
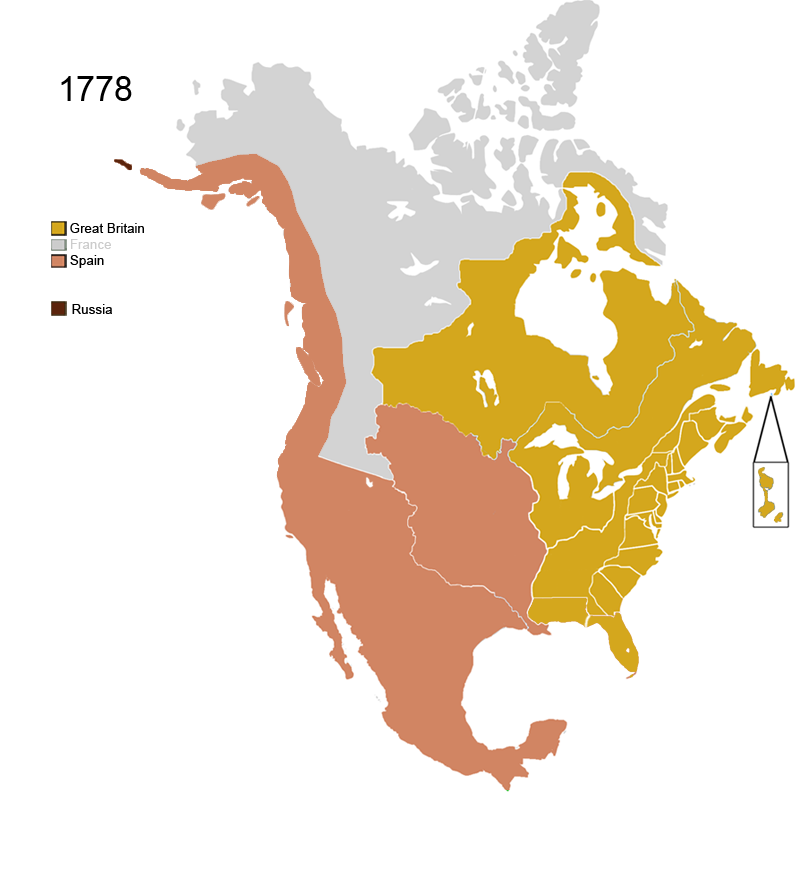

In 1778, Saint Pierre and Miquelon were attacked by a force led by Newfoundland's Governor John Montagu and then population deported by the British as retaliation for French support of the American Revolutionary War. The residents were sent to France and their homes were destroyed.

== 1779 ==
In another attempt to assert Spanish authority over the Pacific coast the Spanish sent Ignatio de Arteaga in La Princesa to what is now Prince of Wales Island and as far north and west as Unalaska.

== 1783 ==
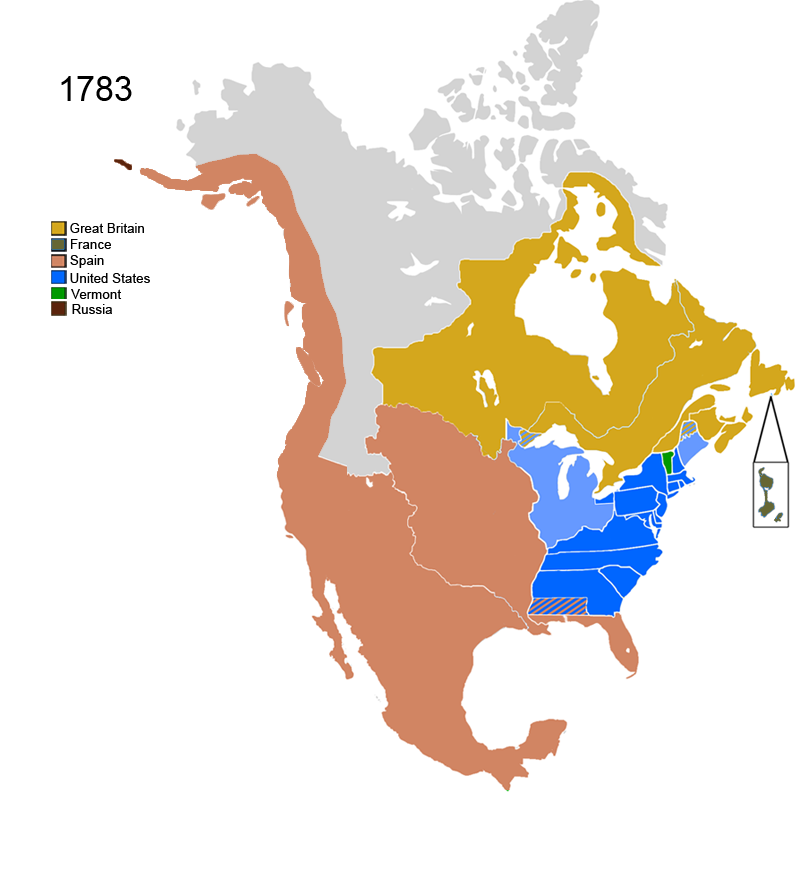

January 20, 1783

Great Britain surrendered East Florida and West Florida to Spain; British inhabitants had 18 months from the date of ratification to leave.

September 3, 1783

The 1783 Treaty of Paris formally ended the American Revolutionary War between Great Britain and the United States of America, which had rebelled against British rule. The other combatant nations, France, Spain and the Dutch Republic, had separate agreements, known as the Peace of Paris (1783). The Kingdom of Great Britain recognized the territory south of what is now Canada, east of the Mississippi and north of Florida as American property. Vermont remained independent until 1791. France regained Saint Pierre and Miquelon in 1783 after the Peace of Paris and some residents returned to the islands.

== 1784 ==
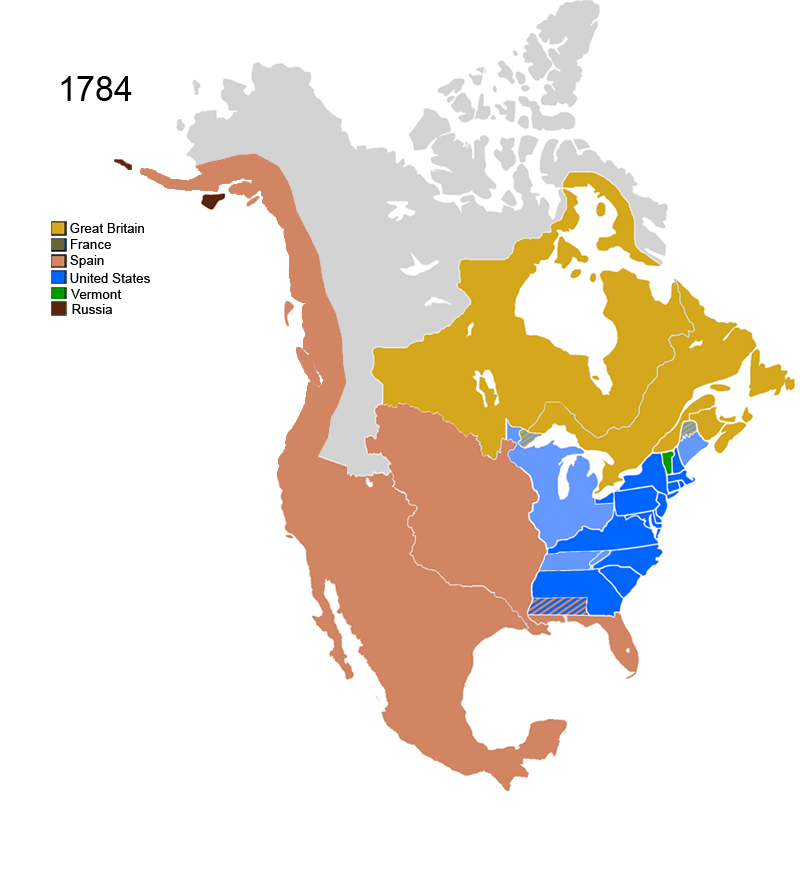

In 1784, Grigory Ivanovich Shelikhov, who later set up the Russian-Alaska Company that colonized early Alaska, arrived in Three Saints Bay on Kodiak Island with two ships, the Three Saints and the St. Simon. The indigenous Koniag harassed the Russian party and Shelikhov responded by killing hundreds and taking hostages to enforce the obedience of the rest. Having established his authority on Kodiak Island, Shelikhov founded the second permanent Russian settlement in Alaska (after Unalaska) on the island's Three Saints Bay.

August 23, 1784

Delegates from the North Carolina counties of Washington, Sullivan, Spencer (now Hawkins) and Greene — all in present-day Tennessee — convened in the town of Jonesborough and declared the lands the State of Frankland, independent of North Carolina. A constitution modeled on that of North Carolina was adopted with few changes, and the state name was changed to "Franklin". By 1790, the state government had collapsed entirely and the territory was again firmly under the control of North Carolina.

== October 28, 1790 ==
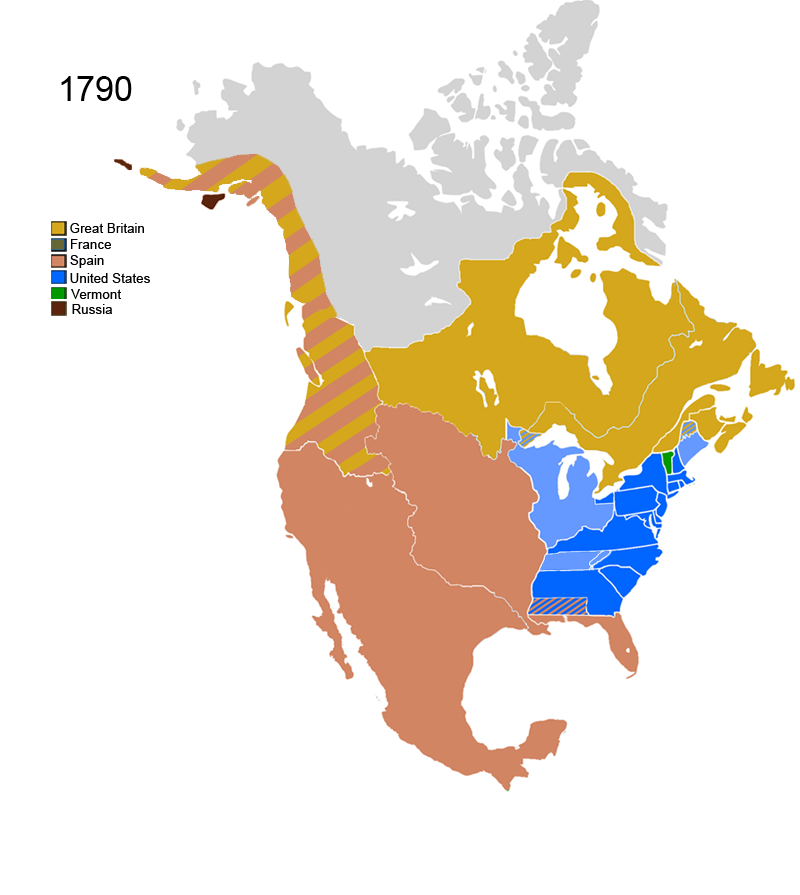

In 1789, in attempt to assert its sovereignty over the Pacific coast the Spanish seized British ships in Nootka Sound on Vancouver Island. This action sparked an international incident that resulted in the Nootka Convention which was signed on October 28, 1790. The conventions stated that the English had the right to found settlements anywhere on the Pacific claimed by Spain but never settled by Spain. As a result, claims of sovereignty on the Pacific were determined by settlement or feet on the ground as opposed to claims based on prior discovery.

== 1791 ==
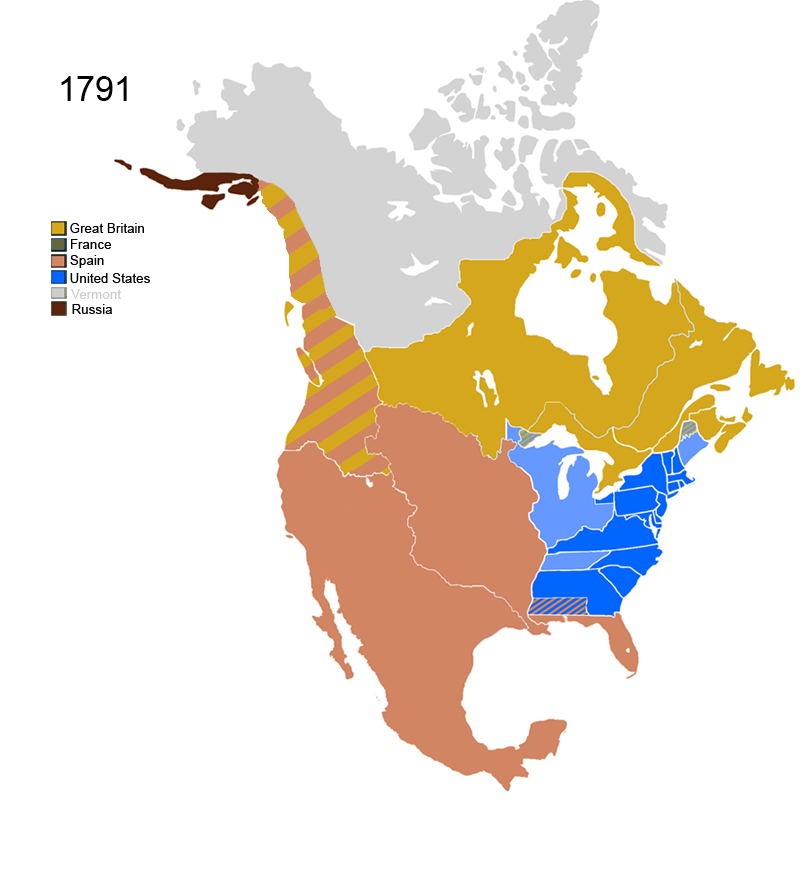

March 4, 1791

The Vermont Republic, which included land claimed by New York and New Hampshire and, while unrecognized by the United States, was a de facto independent country, was admitted to the US as the 14th state, Vermont.

December 26, 1791

The Province of Quebec was divided into two parts, Lower Canada and Upper Canada. The Province of Upper Canada (French: province du Haut-Canada) was a British colony located in what is now the southern portion of the Province of Ontario in Canada. Upper Canada officially existed from 26 December 1791 to 10 February 1841. Its name reflected its position higher up the river or closer to the headwaters of the St. Lawrence River than that of Lower Canada, present-day southern Quebec. The division was effected so that Loyalist American settlers and British immigrants in Upper Canada could have English laws and institutions, and the French-speaking population of Lower Canada could maintain French civil law and the Catholic religion.

== 1792 ==
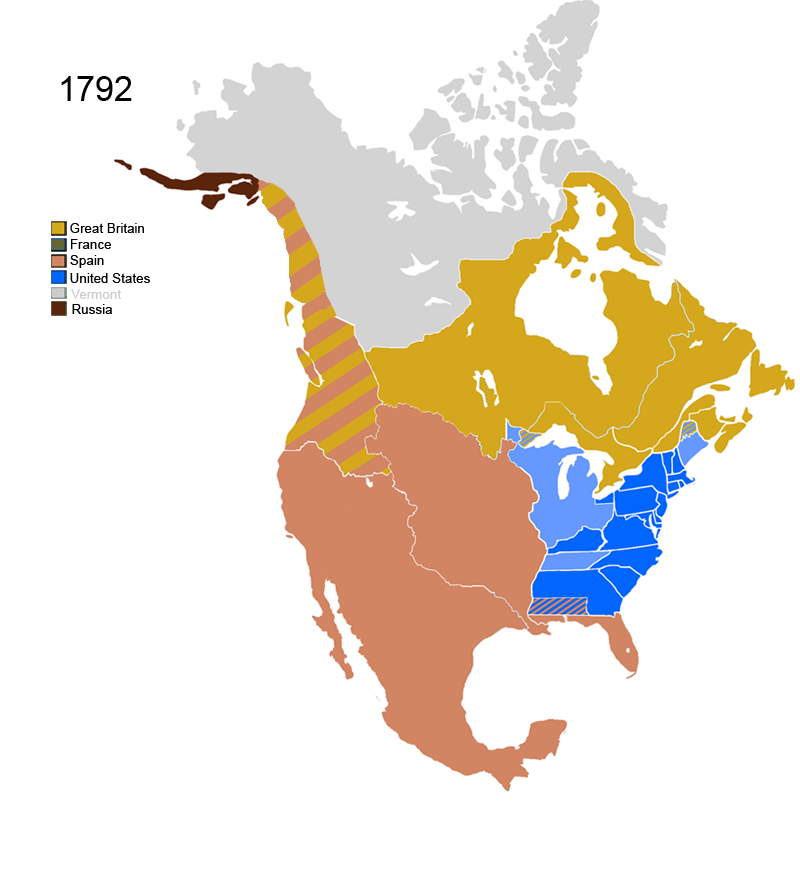

March 3, 1792

The US federal government sold the Erie Triangle to Pennsylvania.

June 1, 1792

The western counties of Virginia beyond the Appalachian Mountains were split off and admitted to the US as the 15th state, Kentucky.

== 1793 ==
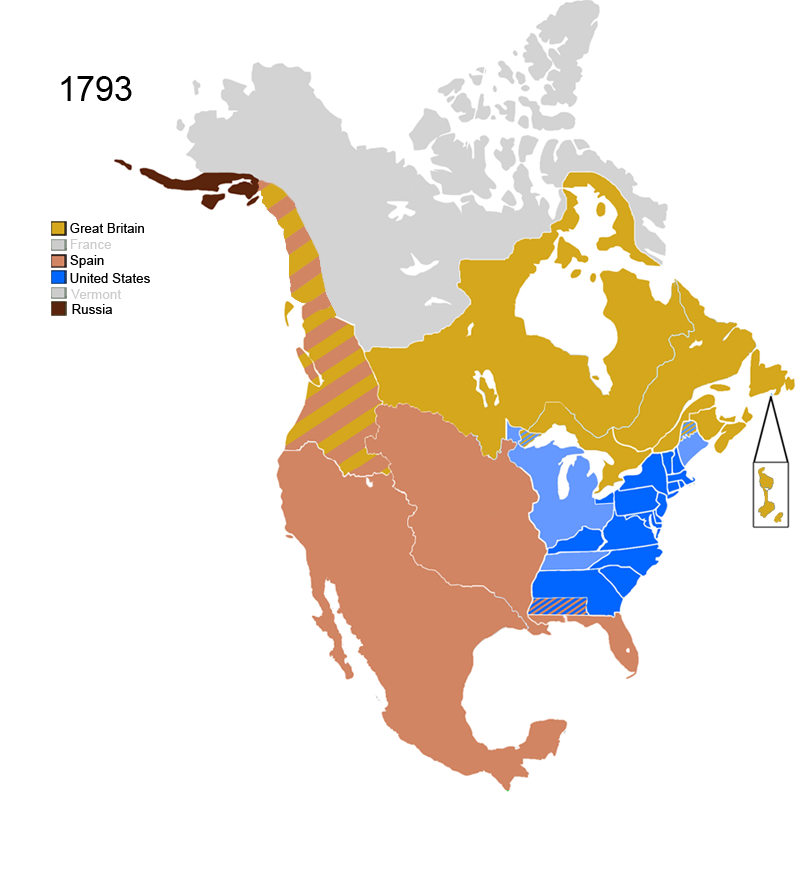

Saint Pierre and Miquelon saw action during the French Revolution when France had declared war on the United Kingdom as part of the War of the First Coalition. This led to a British attack on the islands under Captain William Affleck of Halifax who captured the islands in May 1793.

== 1796 ==
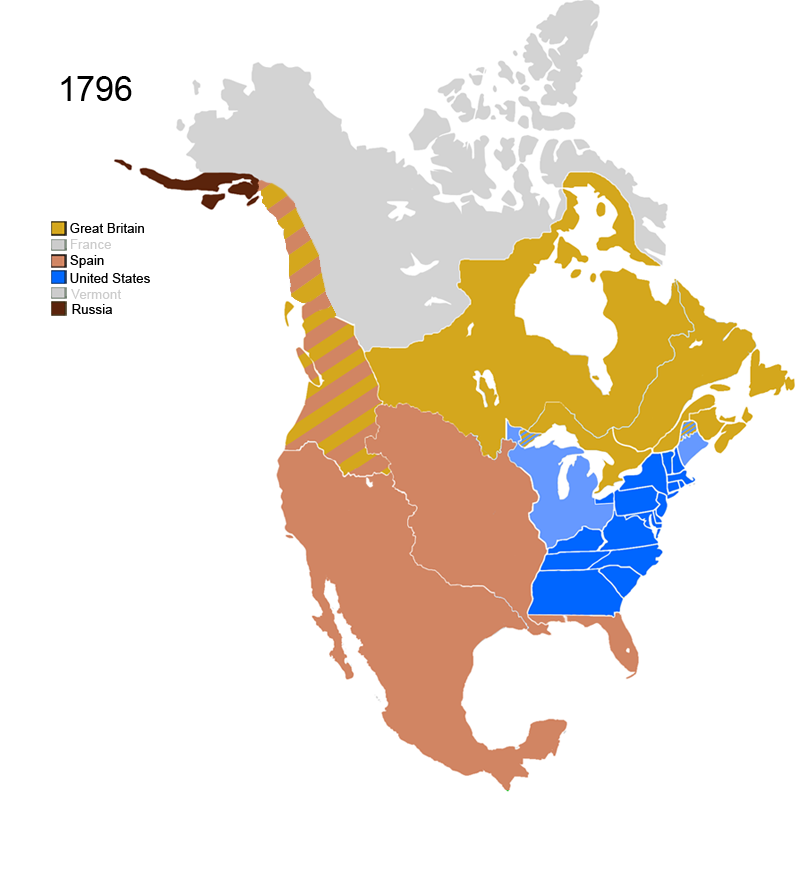

June 1, 1796

The Southwest Territory was admitted to the US as the 16th state, Tennessee.

August 2, 1796

Pinckney's Treaty, also known as the Treaty of San Lorenzo, settled the northern border of West Florida as the 31st parallel.

== 1799 ==
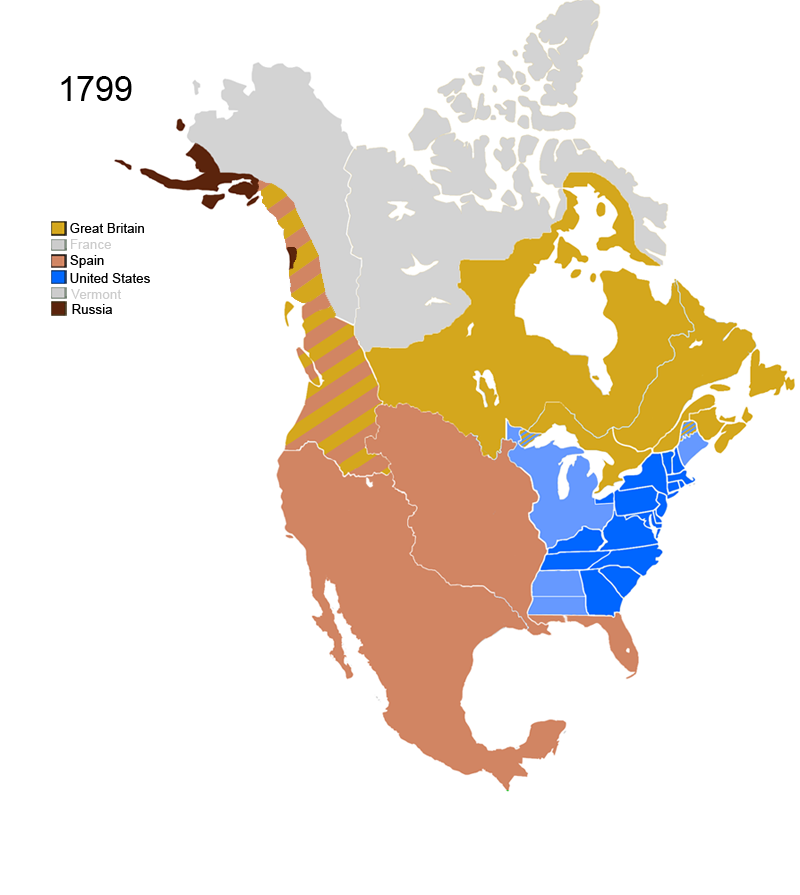

Sitka was originally settled by the native Tlingit people. Old Sitka was founded in 1799 by Alexandr Baranov, the governor of Russian America. Baranov arrived under the auspices of the Russian-American Company, a "semi-official" colonial trading company chartered by Tsar Paul I.

== 1800 ==
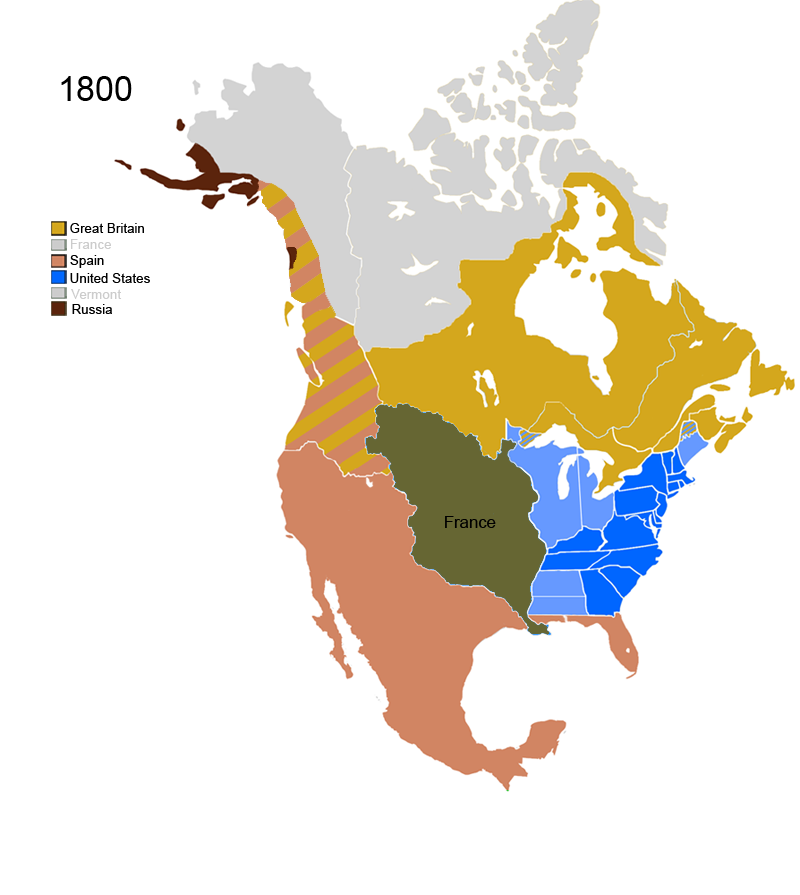

July 4, 1800

Indiana Territory was formed from the western portion of Northwest Territory. It corresponded to present-day Illinois, Indiana, northeastern Minnesota, and Wisconsin, as well as the western half of the Lower Peninsula of Michigan and all but the eastern tip of the Upper Peninsula. Northwest Territory was left with only most of Ohio and the rest of Michigan.

October 1, 1800

In the secretly negotiated Third Treaty of San Ildefonso (formally titled the Preliminary and Secret Treaty between the French Republic and His Catholic Majesty the King of Spain, Concerning the Aggrandizement of His Royal Highness the Infant Duke of Parma in Italy and the Retrocession of Louisiana), Spain returned the colonial territory of Louisiana to France.

== January 1, 1801 ==
The Kingdom of Great Britain or Great Britain changed its name to United Kingdom of Great Britain and Ireland or United Kingdom on January 1, 1801, due to the Acts of Union 1800. (Note: Not shown on the map as it is a name change, not a territorial change)

== 1802 ==
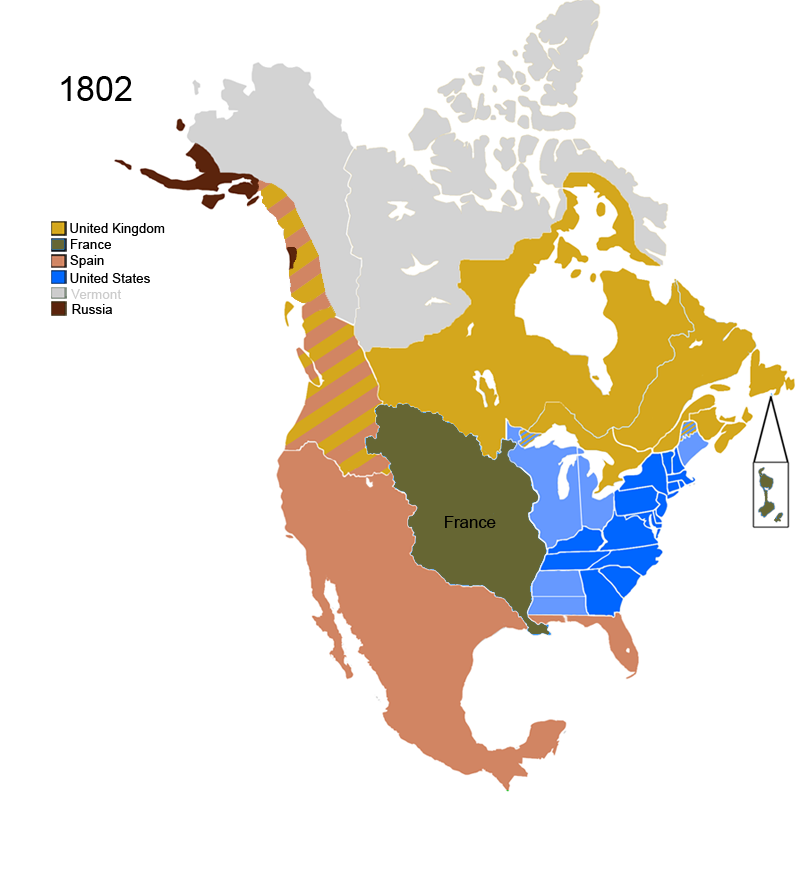

Amiens Treaty of 1802 specified that Saint Pierre and Miquelon would again be returned to France, although it took until 1816 for the British to honor the Treaty and allow the French to return.

== 1803 ==
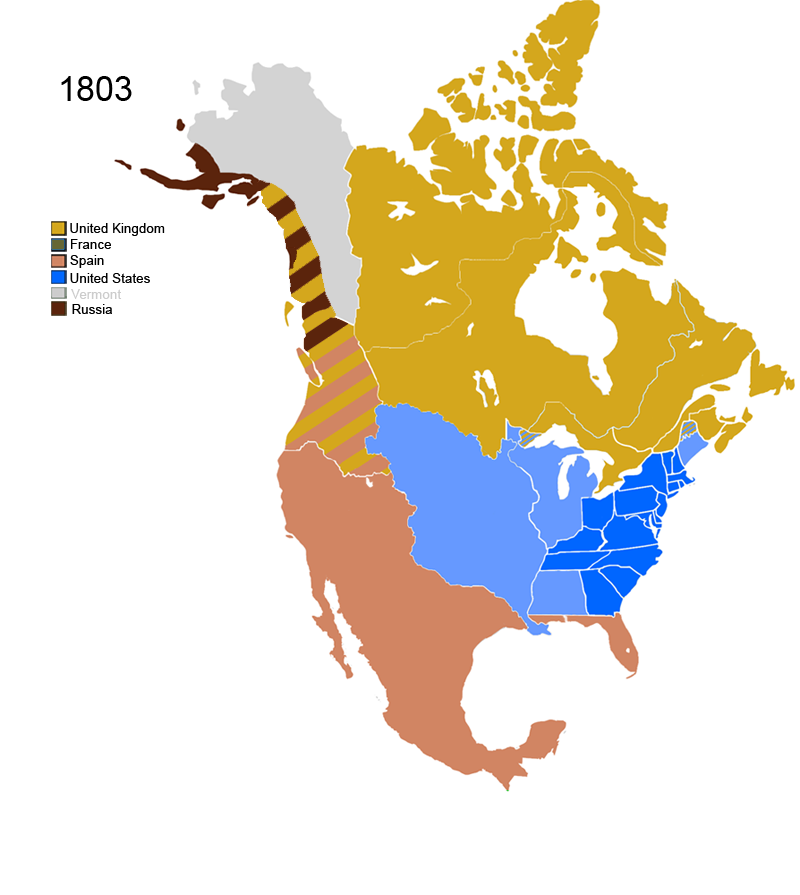

March 1, 1803

The southeastern portion of Northwest Territory was admitted to the US as the 17th state, Ohio. The remainder of Northwest Territory was transferred to Indiana Territory.

April 30, 1803

The Louisiana Purchase was made, expanding the United States west of the Mississippi River. There was a dispute with West Florida over how much land east of the Mississippi River it included. The purchase extended slightly north of the modern borders, as it was defined only as the watershed of the Mississippi River. The purchase consisted of the whole of present-day Arkansas, Kansas, Iowa, Missouri, Nebraska, and Oklahoma, and portions of Colorado, Louisiana, Minnesota, Montana, New Mexico, North Dakota, South Dakota, Texas and Wyoming. It also included the southernmost portions of the present-day Canadian provinces of Alberta, Manitoba, and Saskatchewan. The cost was 60 million francs ($11,250,000) plus cancellation of debts worth 18 million francs ($3,750,000). Including interest, the U.S. finally paid $23,213,568 (US$499,091,712 in 2025) for the Louisiana territory.

September 1803

The North West Company organized an overland expedition from Montreal to James Bay and a second expedition by sea. In September 1803, the overland party met the company's ship at Charlton Island in what is now Nunavut. There, they lay claim to the territory that drained into the Arctic in the name of the North West Company.

== 1805 ==
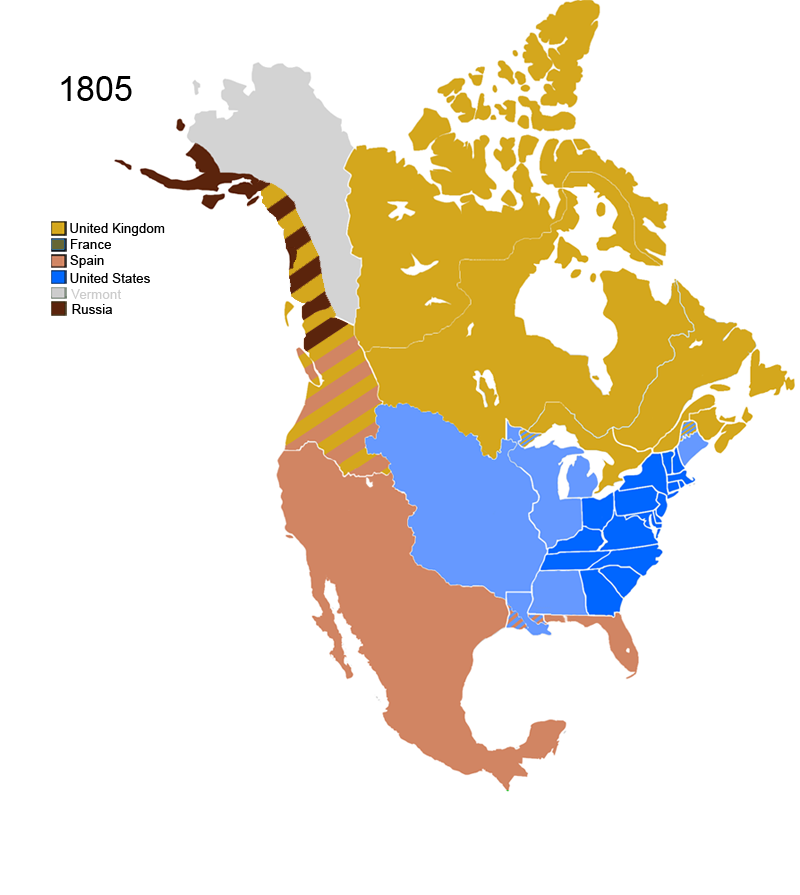

January 11, 1805

Michigan Territory was split from Indiana Territory, including the whole of the lower peninsula of present-day Michigan but only that eastern tip of the upper peninsula which was held by the Northwest Territory after Indiana Territory had been split from it.

July 4, 1805

The District of Louisiana was organized as Louisiana Territory.

== March 1, 1809 ==
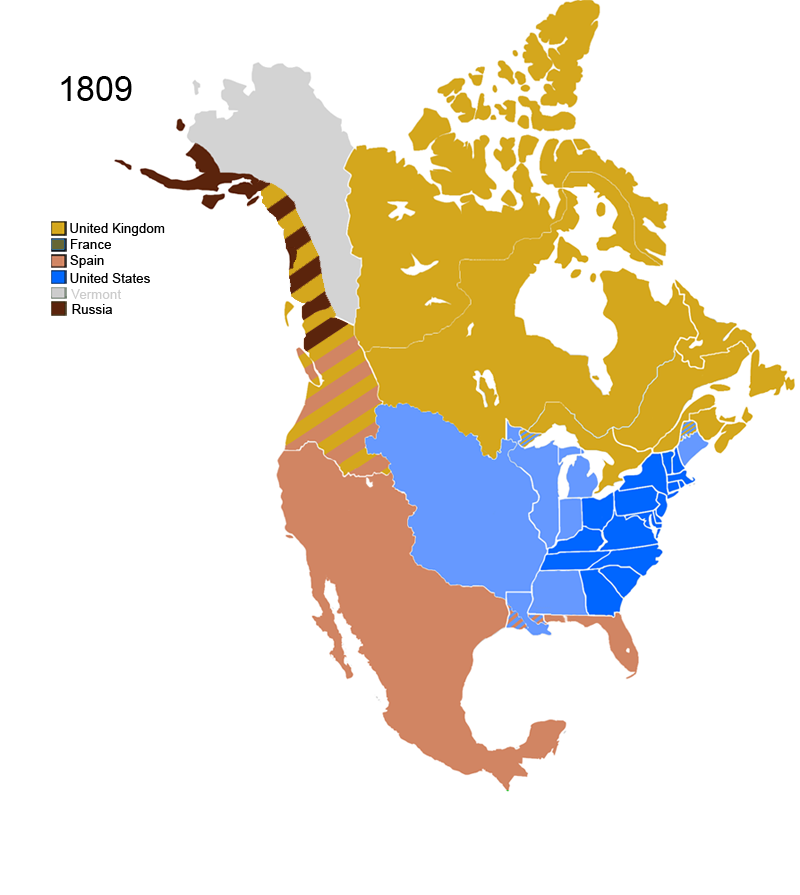

Illinois Territory was split from Indiana Territory. Illinois Territory included present-day Illinois, northeastern Minnesota, and Wisconsin. Indiana Territory included the present-day borders of Indiana, with its western and eastern borders continuing northward; thus, it also included the central portion of the upper peninsula of Michigan, as well as Door Peninsula of present-day Wisconsin.

== 1810 ==
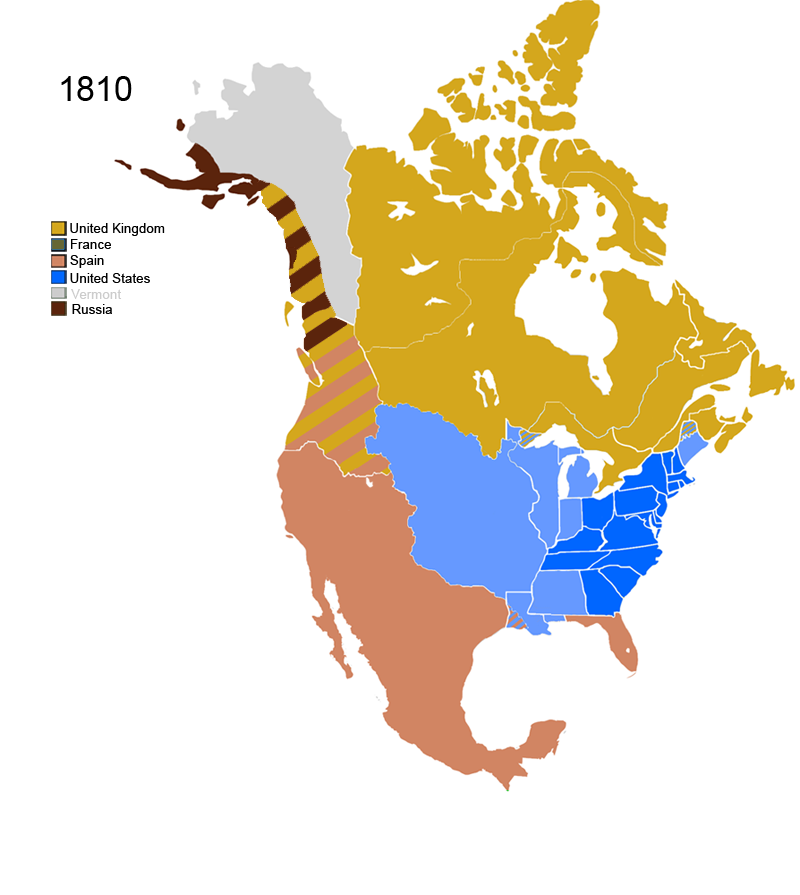

September 23, 1810

The short-lived Republic of West Florida declared its independence from Spain. (Note: Not shown on the map as the Republic only lasted 79 days)

October 27, 1810

US President James Madison proclaimed the annexation of the Baton Rouge and Mobile Districts of West Florida, declaring them part of the Louisiana Purchase. The US Army occupied the capital, St. Francisville, on December 6 and Baton Rouge on December 10, bringing an end to the Republic of West Florida after 79 days.

== 1812 ==
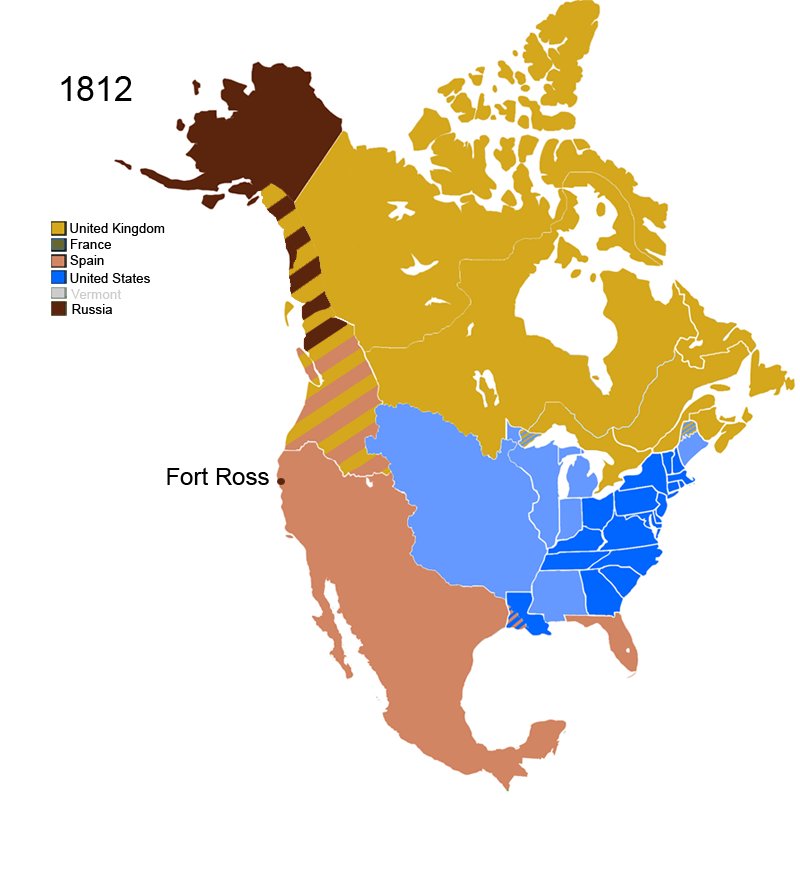

- April 30. Most of the Territory of Orleans was admitted to the US as the 18th state, Louisiana. The rest of the territory (the northwestern tip) was ceded to Louisiana Territory.
- Russian Colony Fort Ross was created.

== December 11, 1816 ==
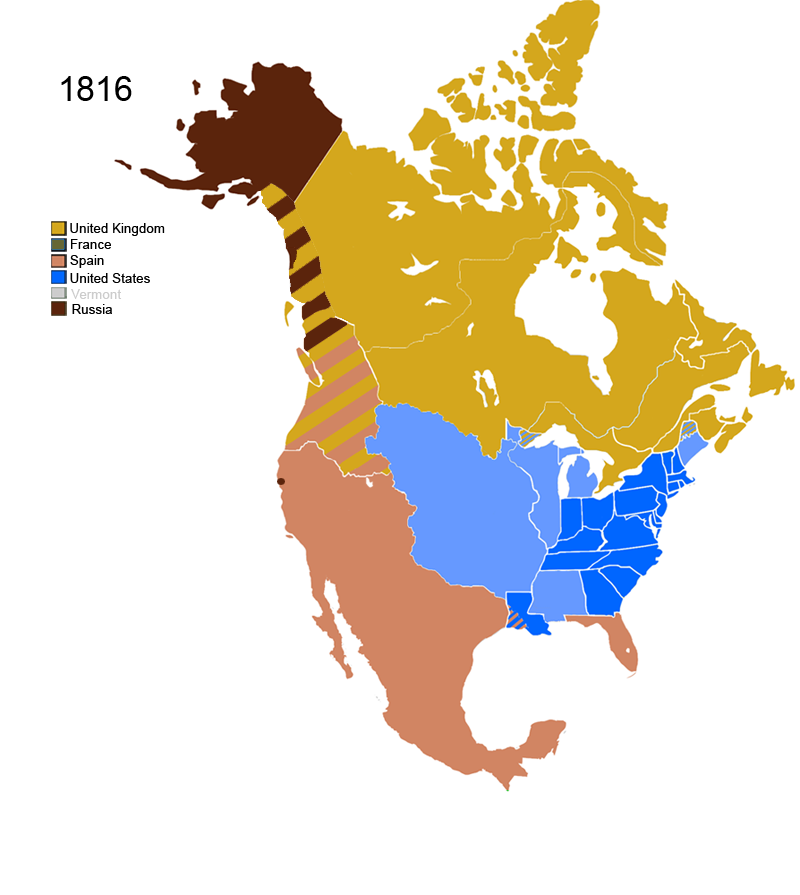

The southern portion of Indiana Territory was admitted as the 19th state, Indiana. The remainder became unorganized.

== 1817 ==
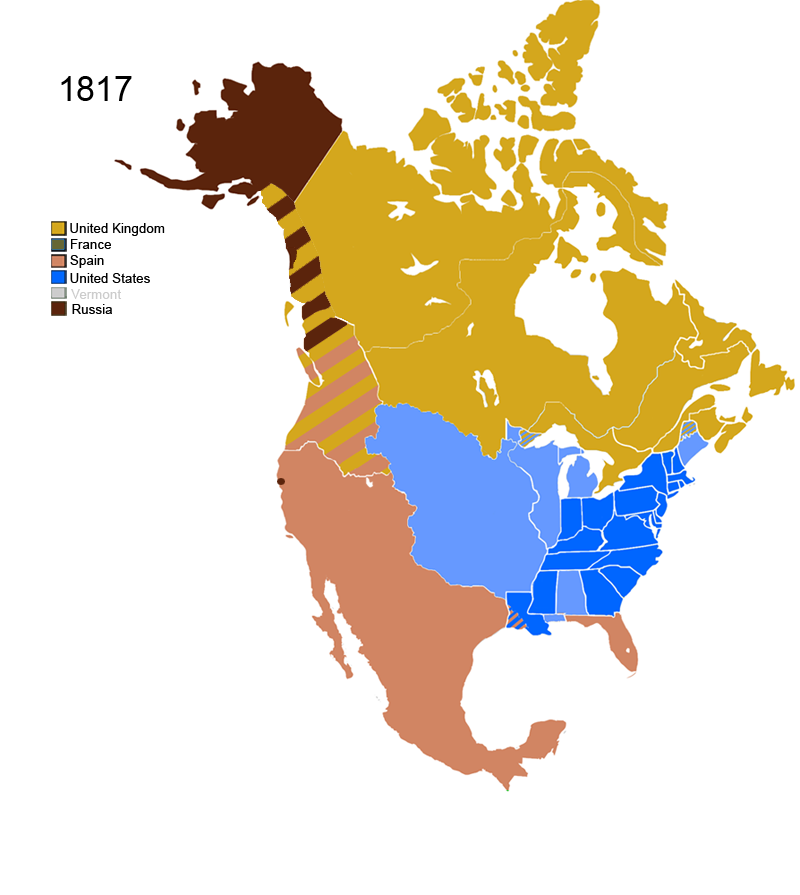

March 3, 1817

Alabama Territory was split from Mississippi Territory; both correspond to their present-day counterparts.

December 10, 1817

Mississippi Territory was admitted to the US as the 20th state, Mississippi.

== 1818 ==
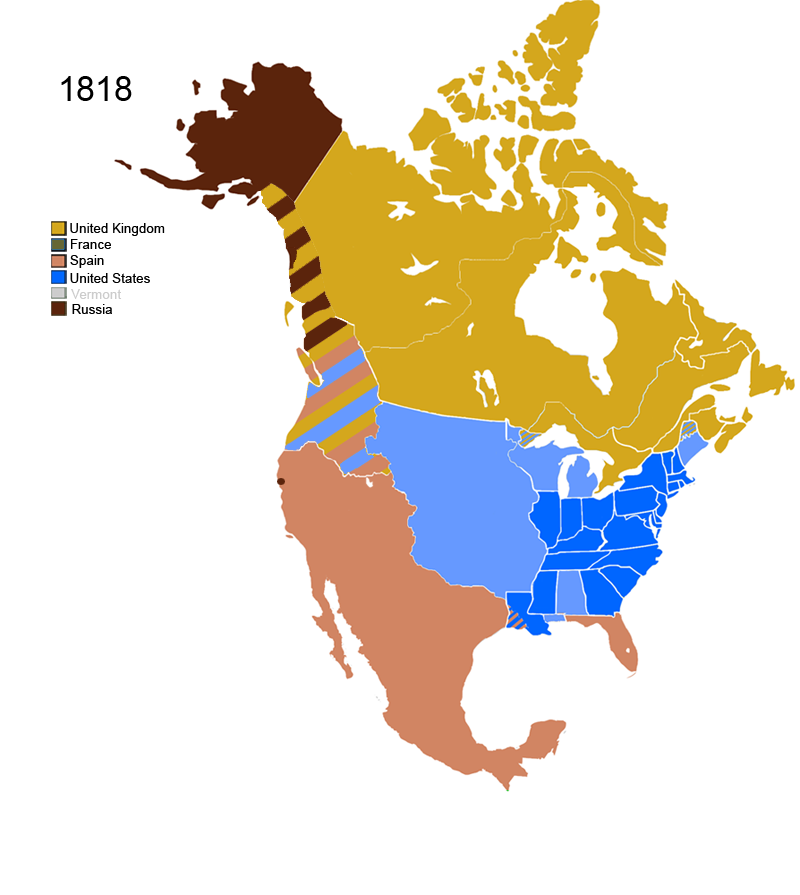

October 20, 1818

The Treaty of 1818 established the 49th parallel north west of the Lake of the Woods as the border with British-held lands, and Oregon Country was established as a shared land between the United States and United Kingdom. Oregon Country consisted of most of present-day Idaho and Oregon, all of Washington, and a portion of Montana, as well as the southern part of the unorganized British territory which became British Columbia. The treaty transferred the Red River Basin to the United States, consisting of northwestern Minnesota, northeastern North Dakota, and the northeastern tip of South Dakota.

November 24, 1818

Argentine corsair Hippolyte Bouchard and his crew unilaterally captured the Californian capital of Monterey for six days, annoying the Spanish for trade in the Pacific.

December 3, 1818

The southern portion of Illinois Territory was admitted as the 21st state, Illinois. The remainder was reassigned to Michigan Territory. The unorganized lands which had been a part of Indiana Territory prior to the admission of Indiana as a state were also assigned to Michigan Territory.

== 1819 ==
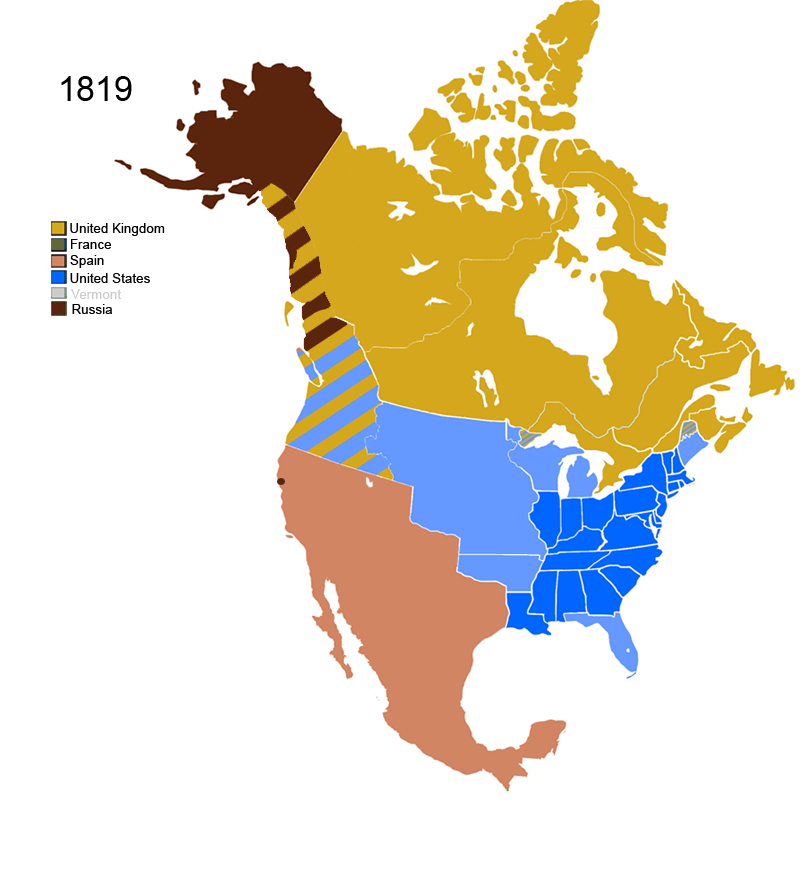

February 22, 1819

The Adams-Onís Treaty or Transcontinental Treaty was signed in Washington, establishing a defined border between the United States and New Spain. The treaty ceded Spain's claims to Oregon Country to the United States and American claims to Texas to Spain; moved portions of present-day Colorado, Oklahoma, and Wyoming, and all of New Mexico and Texas, to New Spain; and all of Spanish Florida as well as a small portion of modern-day Colorado to the United States. The new borders intruded on Arkansaw Territory's Miller County, created on April 1, 1820, which dipped below the Red River and into land ceded to Spain. However, the remoteness of the region caused no serious conflict with Spain.

March 2, 1819

The southern part of Missouri Territory was organized as Arkansaw Territory, consisting of present-day Arkansas as well as part of Oklahoma. It was not officially spelled Arkansas until later.

December 14, 1819

Alabama Territory was admitted to the US as the 22nd state, Alabama.

== 1820 ==
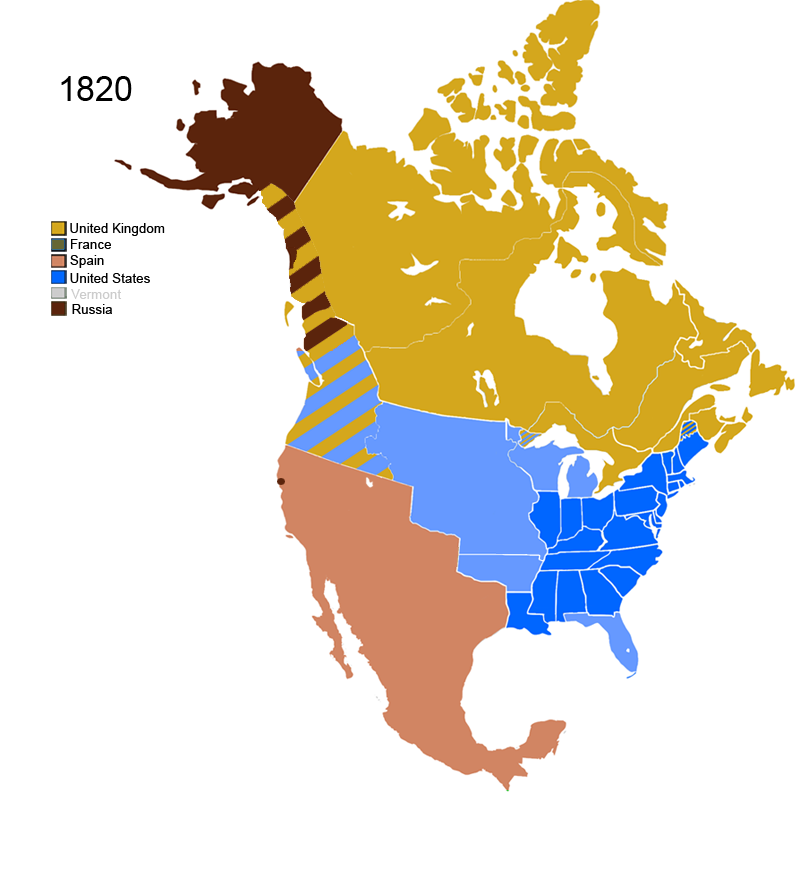

March 16, 1820

The Maine District of Massachusetts was split off and admitted to the US as the 23rd state, Maine, as part of the Missouri Compromise.

== 1821 ==
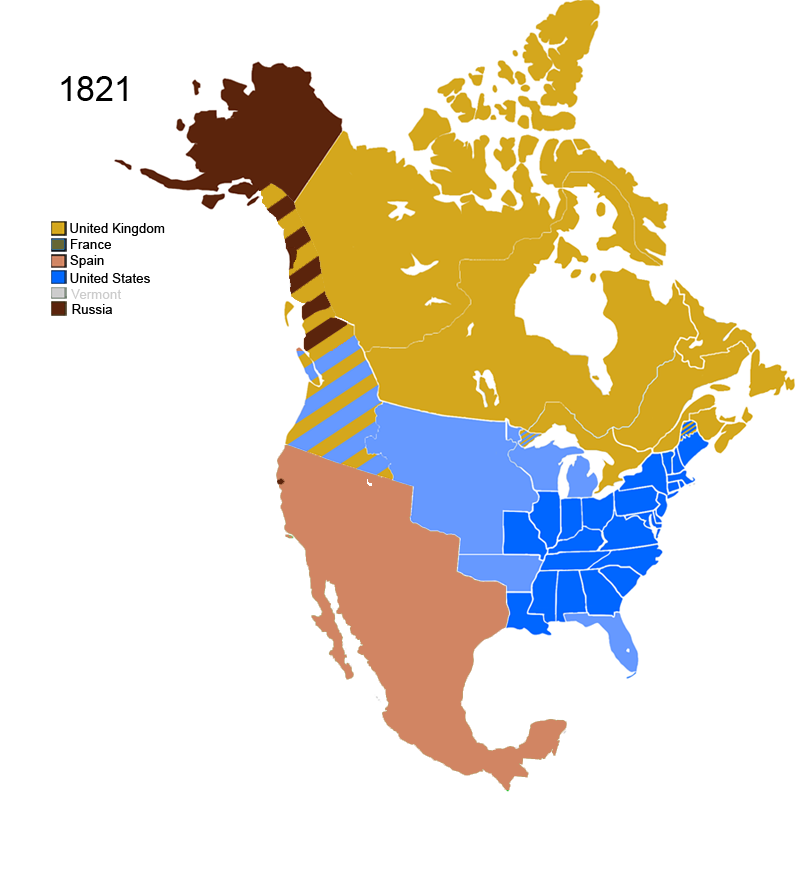

July 1821

In 1821, the North West Company of Montreal and the Hudson's Bay Company merged, with a combined territory that was further extended by a license to the watershed of the Arctic Ocean on the north and the Pacific Ocean on the west.

August 10, 1821

The southeastern corner of Missouri Territory was admitted to the US as the 24th state, Missouri. The remainder became unorganized. Missouri did not include its northwestern triangle at this point, that being added later in the Platte Purchase.

== 1824 ==
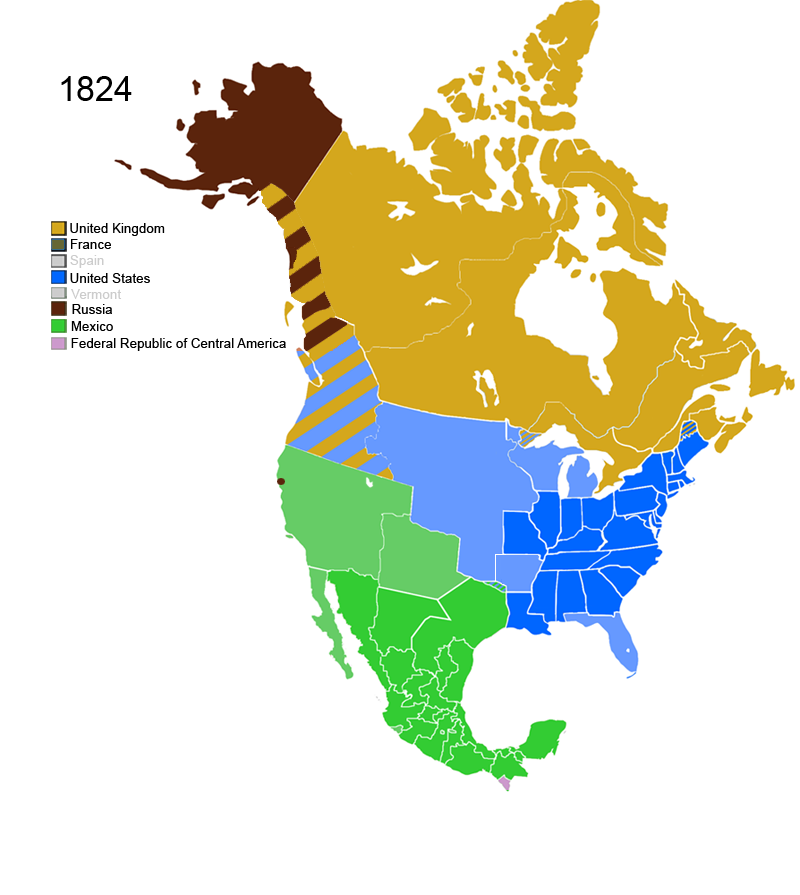

October 4, 1824

The 1824 Constitution of Mexico was enacted, creating the United Mexican States and replacing the Mexican Empire, which had collapsed on March 19, 1823. The constitution organized the country into 19 states and four territories. In the aftermath of the end of the empire, Central American regions, which had been a part of Mexico since 1822, mostly voted not to stay a part of Mexico, with Chiapas, formerly part of Guatemala, being the only area that favored remaining in Mexico. However, rebels in one part of Chiapas, Soconusco, proclaimed its separation from Mexico on July 24, 1824, and it was formally annexed by the Federal Republic of Central America on August 18, 1824.

November 15, 1824

Arkansas Territory was shrunk, the western portion becoming unorganized.

== February 28, 1825 ==
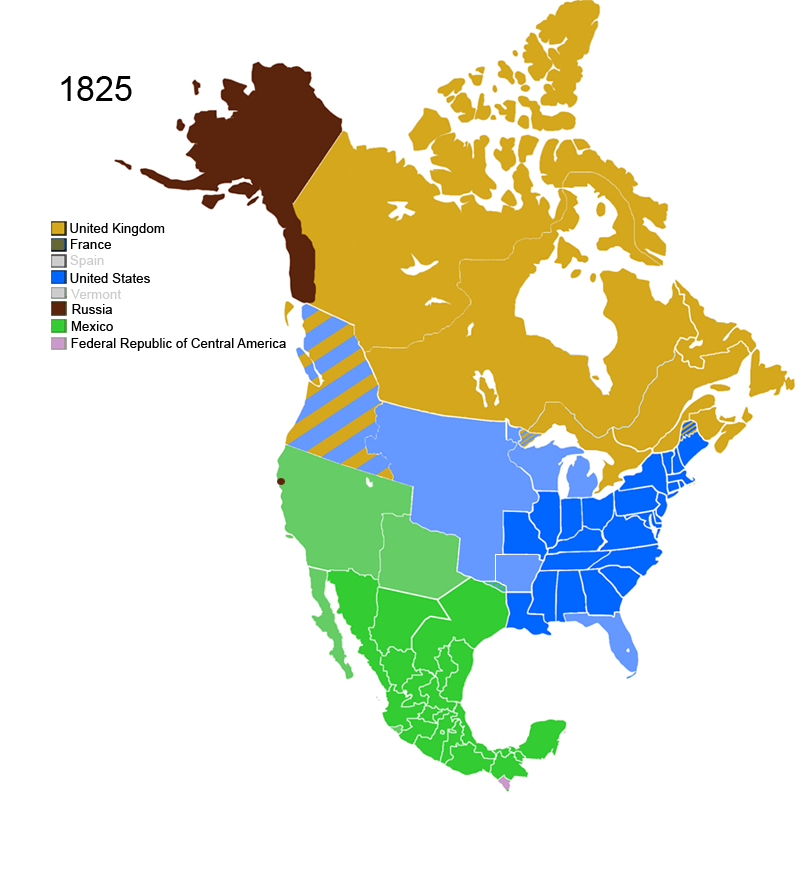

The Treaty of Saint Petersburg of 1825, also known as the Anglo-Russian Convention of 1825, defined the boundaries between Russian America and British claims and possessions in the Pacific Northwest of North America at 54 degrees 40 minutes north latitude.

== 1828 ==
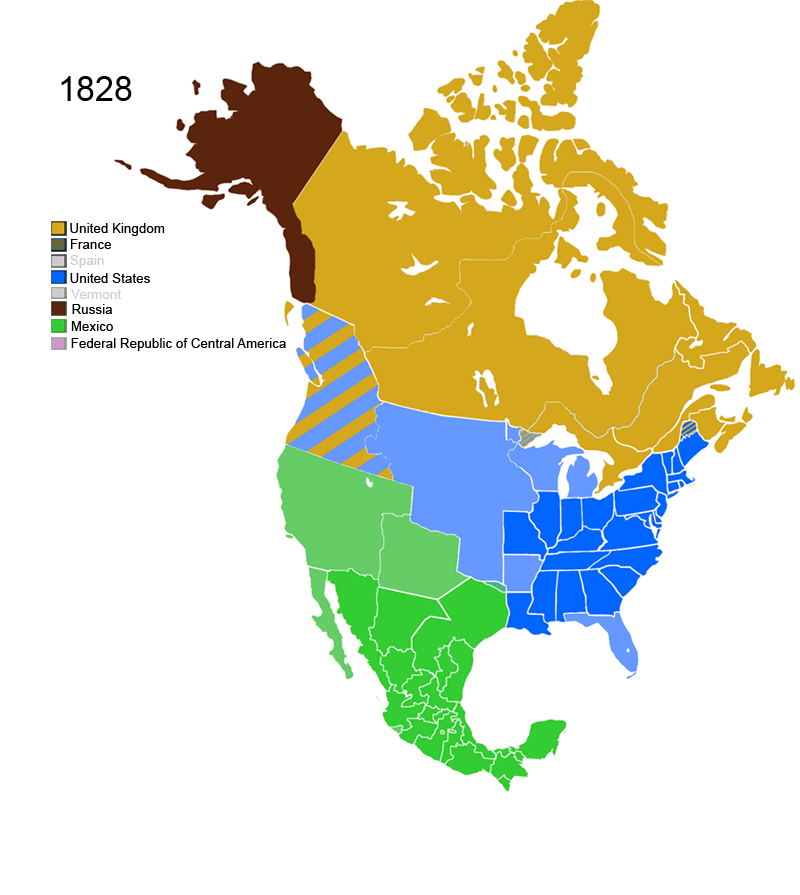

May 6, 1828

Arkansas Territory was shrunk further, attaining the present-day borders of Arkansas, with the remainder again becoming unorganized, excepting the land it still claimed as Miller County.

== September 30, 1830 ==
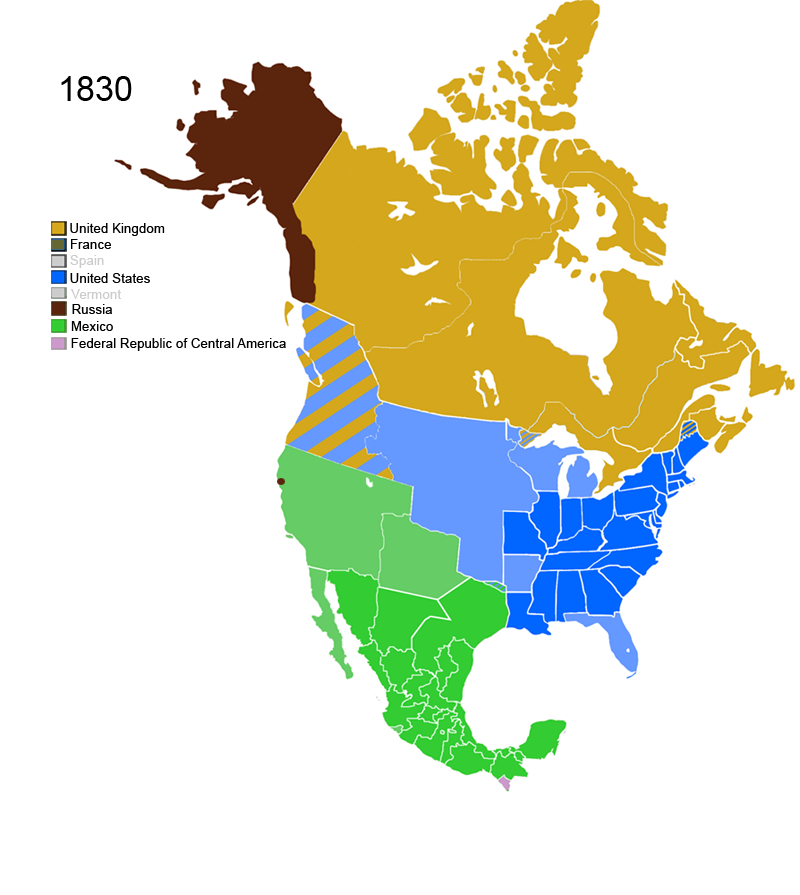

The state of Sonora y Sinaloa was split into two states, Sinaloa and Sonora.

== 1835 ==
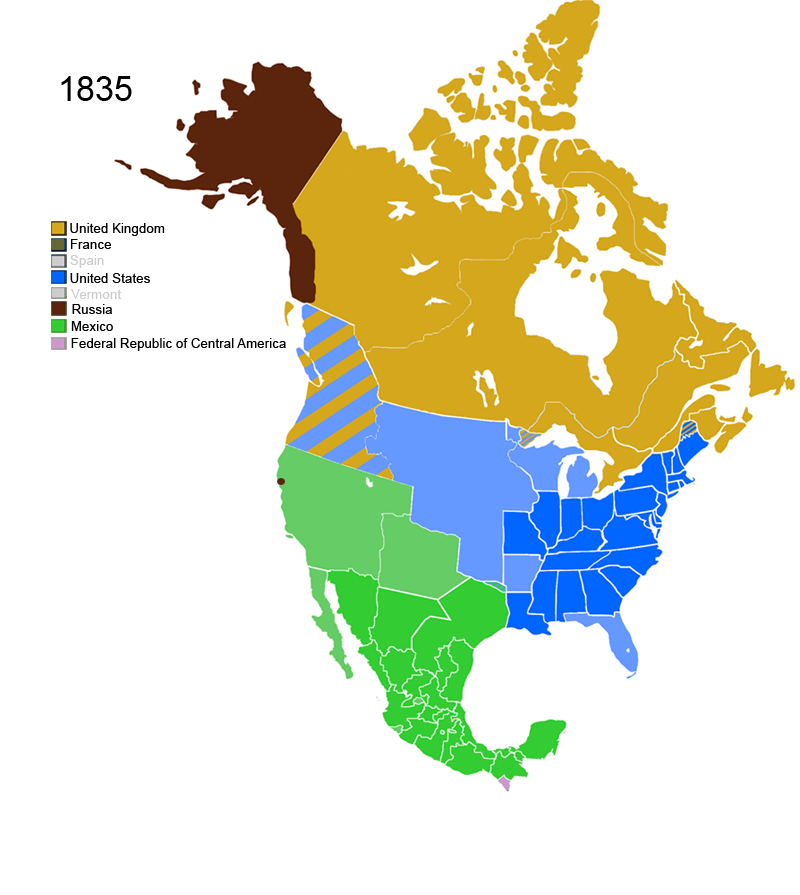

May 23, 1835

The territory of Aguascalientes was split from the state of Zacatecas.

June 30, 1834

A large portion of unorganized land was added to Michigan Territory, corresponding to present-day Iowa, western Minnesota, and eastern North Dakota and South Dakota.

== 1836 ==
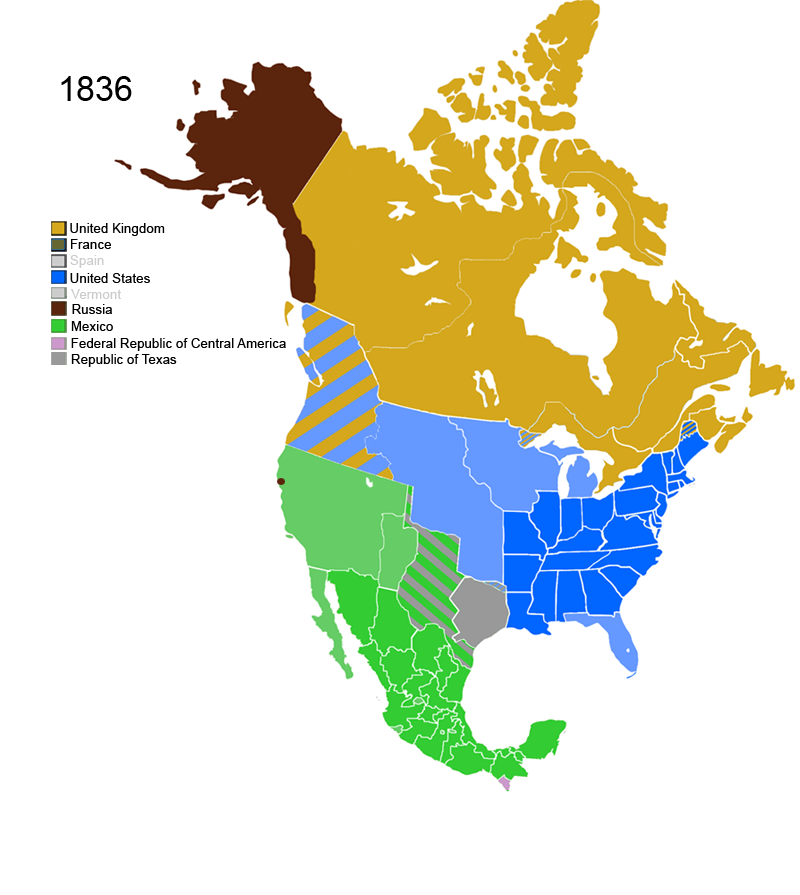

June 15, 1836

Arkansas Territory was admitted to the US as the 25th state, Arkansas. It continued to claim Miller County, with increasing irrelevance.

March 2, 1836

Due to disapproval of the government of Antonio López de Santa Anna, the Tejas region of the state of Coahuila y Tejas declared independence. The remainder was renamed simply Coahuila. The Treaties of Velasco signified the end of the Texas Revolution on May 14, 1836, creating the Republic of Texas.

July 4, 1836

Wisconsin Territory was split off from Michigan Territory, consisting of present-day Wisconsin, Minnesota, Iowa, and eastern North and South Dakota. As an inducement to give up its claim over the Toledo Strip to Ohio, the whole of the present-day upper peninsula was assigned to Michigan Territory, giving it the present-day borders of Michigan.

== 1837 ==
January 26, 1837

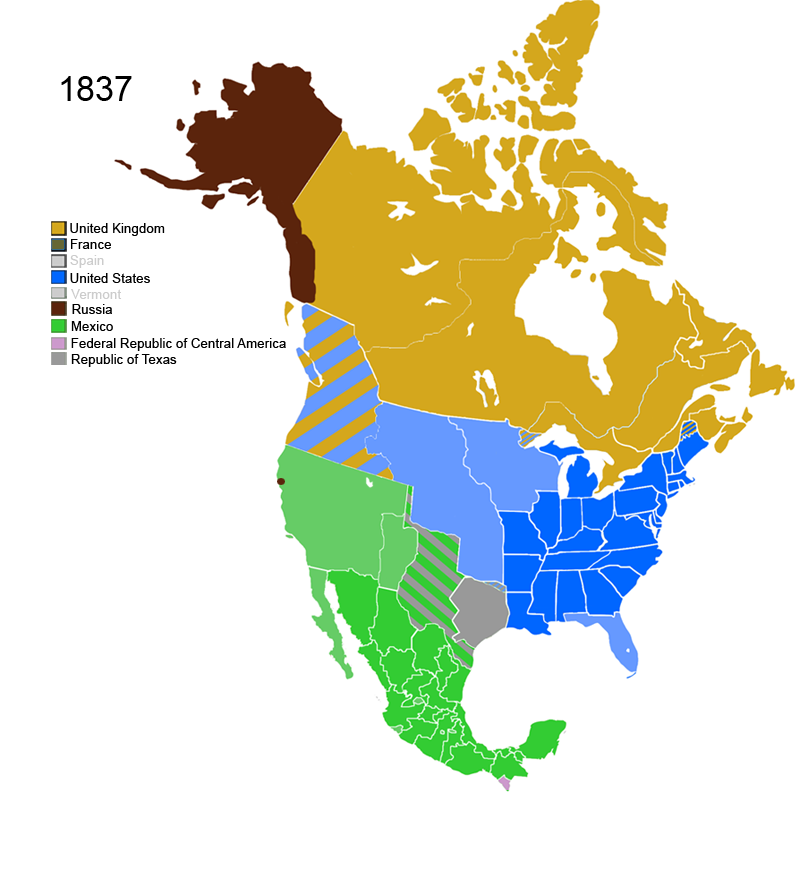

Michigan Territory was admitted to the US as the 26th state, Michigan.

March 28, 1837

The Platte Purchase added a small area of land to Missouri, giving it its present-day boundaries.

== July 4, 1838 ==
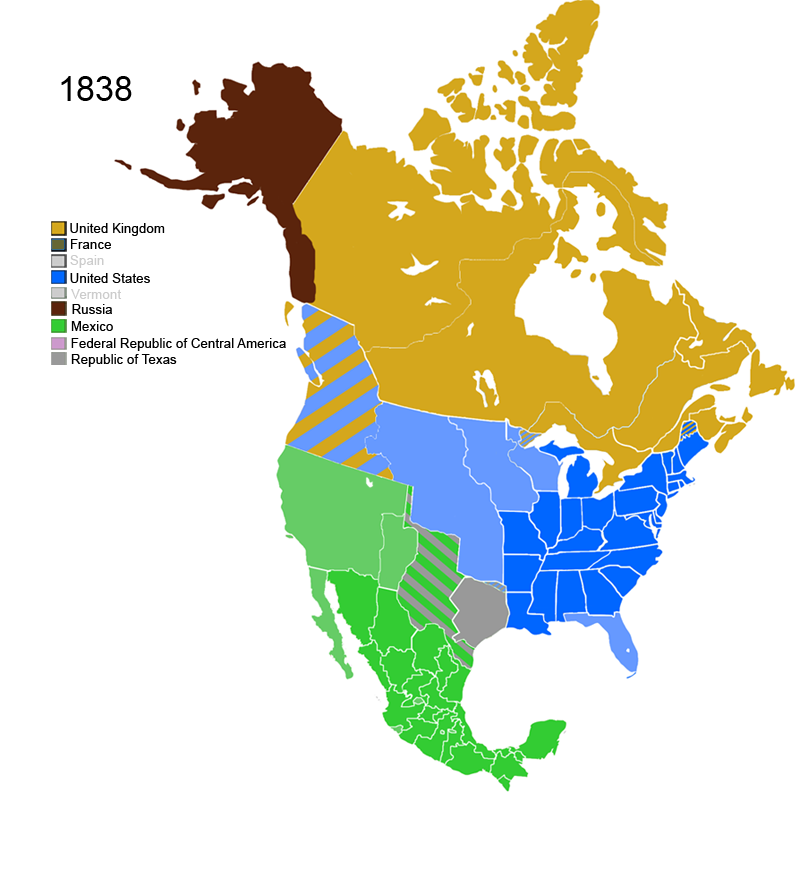

Iowa Territory was split off from Wisconsin Territory, consisting of present-day Iowa, western Minnesota, and eastern North Dakota and South Dakota, leaving Wisconsin Territory with northeastern Minnesota and Wisconsin.

== January 17, 1840 ==
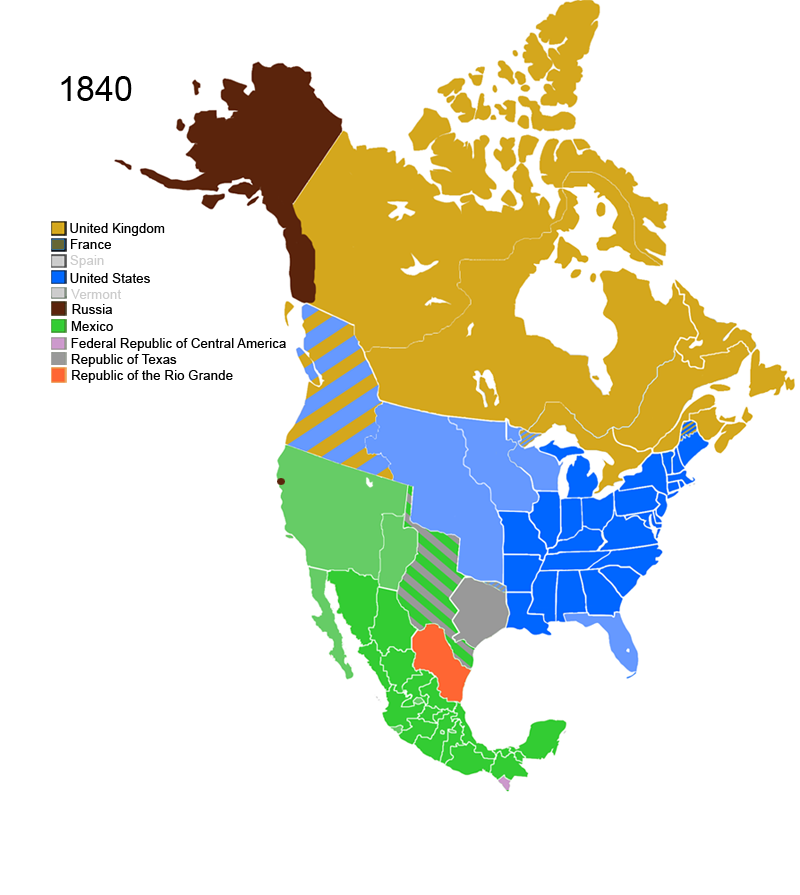

Voicing the same concerns as Texas, the states of Coahuila, Nuevo León, and Tamaulipas declared independence from Mexico as the Republic of the Rio Grande; since the border of Texas was never conclusively decided, they claim a northern border of the Nueces River, while Texas claims a southern border of the Rio Grande. The rebellion lasted until November 6, 1840. The nation was never fully established, and only existed in the minds of a few.

== 1841 ==
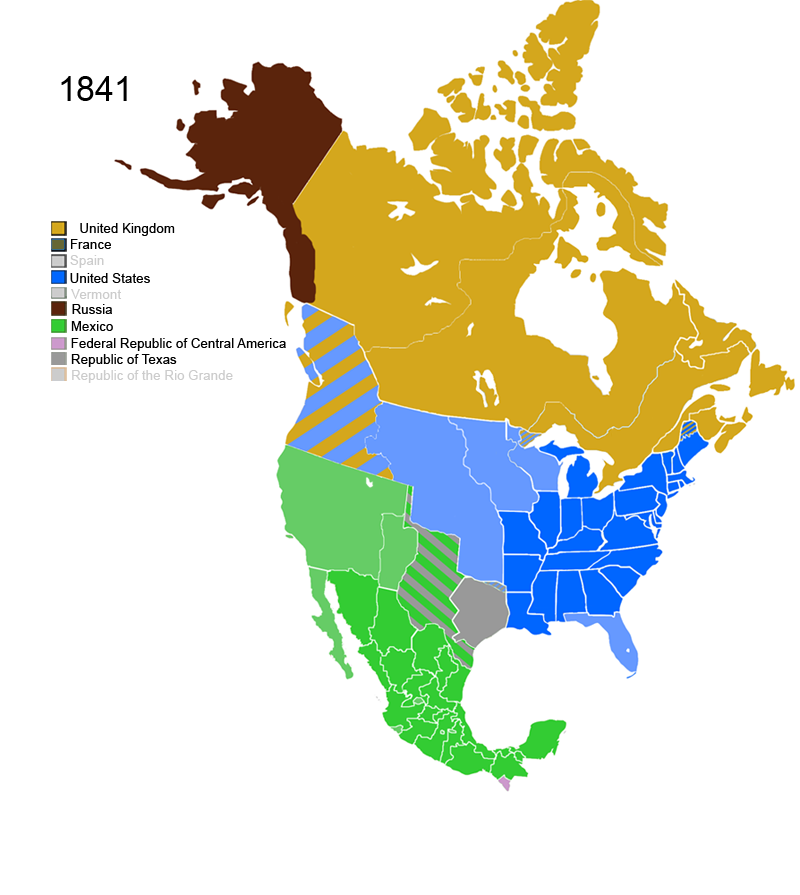

February 10, 1841

The Province of Canada or the United Province of Canada was created by combining Lower Canada and Upper Canada. It was a British colony in North America from 1841 to 1867. Its formation reflected recommendations made by John Lambton, 1st Earl of Durham in the Report on the Affairs of British North America following the Rebellions of 1837. The Province of Canada ceased to exist at Canadian Confederation on July 1, 1867, when it was redivided into the modern Canadian provinces of Ontario and Quebec.

The Russians were forced to sell Fort Ross due to its economic failure. A private investor, John Sutter, agreed to pay $30,000 (US$936,290 in 2025) over a three-year period.

== 1842 ==
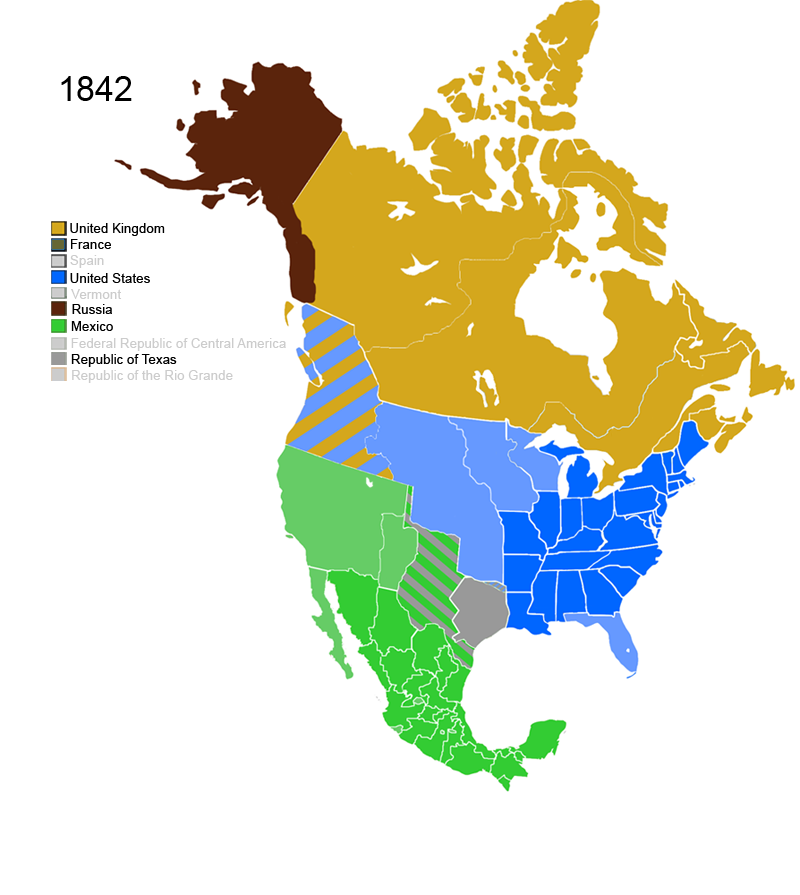

September 11, 1842

The district of Soconusco rejoined Mexico as part of the state of Chiapas.

November 10, 1842

The Webster-Ashburton Treaty settled the border between the United States and lands held by the United Kingdom east of the Rocky Mountains, ending the disputes over the northern border of the state of Maine and northeastern border of Wisconsin Territory, which today resides in present-day Minnesota.

== 1845 ==
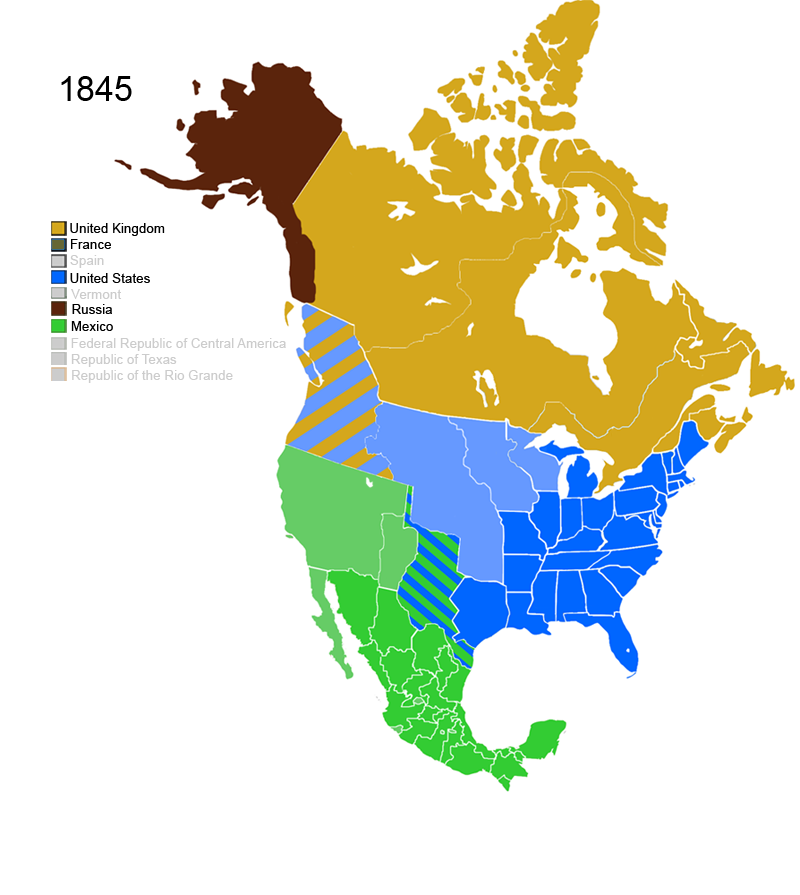

March 3, 1845

Florida Territory was admitted to the US as the 27th state, Florida.

December 29, 1845

The Republic of Texas was admitted to the US as the 28th state, Texas. The United States Congress passed the joint resolution of annexation on March 1, 1845, but Texas did not agree to join the union for some time after. Although the annexation resolution avoided specifying Texas's boundaries, the U.S. inherited Texas's unenforced claims to South Texas, West Texas, over half of New Mexico, a third of Colorado, and small parts of Oklahoma, Kansas and Wyoming. With Texas joining the union, Arkansas finally gave up its claim on Miller County.

== 1846 ==
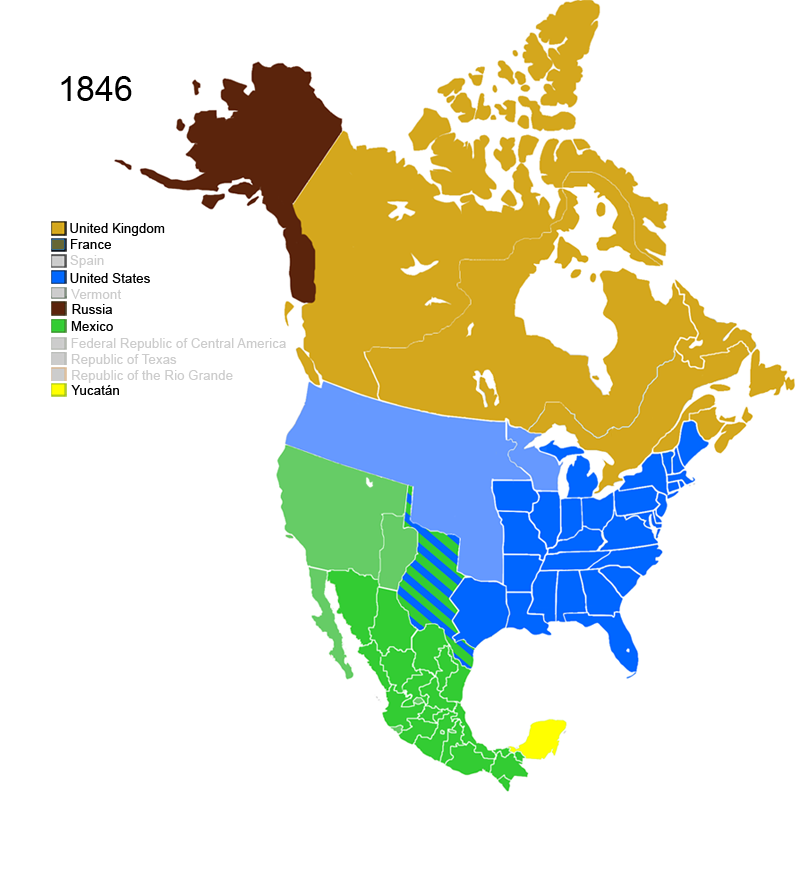

January 1, 1846

The state of Yucatán declares independence, for the same reasons as the Republic of Texas and Republic of the Rio Grande, forming the Republic of Yucatán.

June 14, 1846

The California Republic, also called the Bear Flag Republic, was proclaimed by settlers in Sonoma in the then-Mexican province of California. Declared during the Mexican–American War, the republic lasted less than a month. (Note: Not shown on the map as the Republic only lasted under a month)

June 18, 1846

The Oregon Treaty established the 49th parallel west of the Lake of the Woods as the continental border (so it did not include Vancouver Island) with the lands held by the United Kingdom. The sharing of Oregon Country ended, and the American portion becomes unorganized territory.

December 28, 1846

The southeast portion of Iowa Territory was admitted to the US as the 29th state, Iowa. The remainder became unorganized.

== 1848 ==
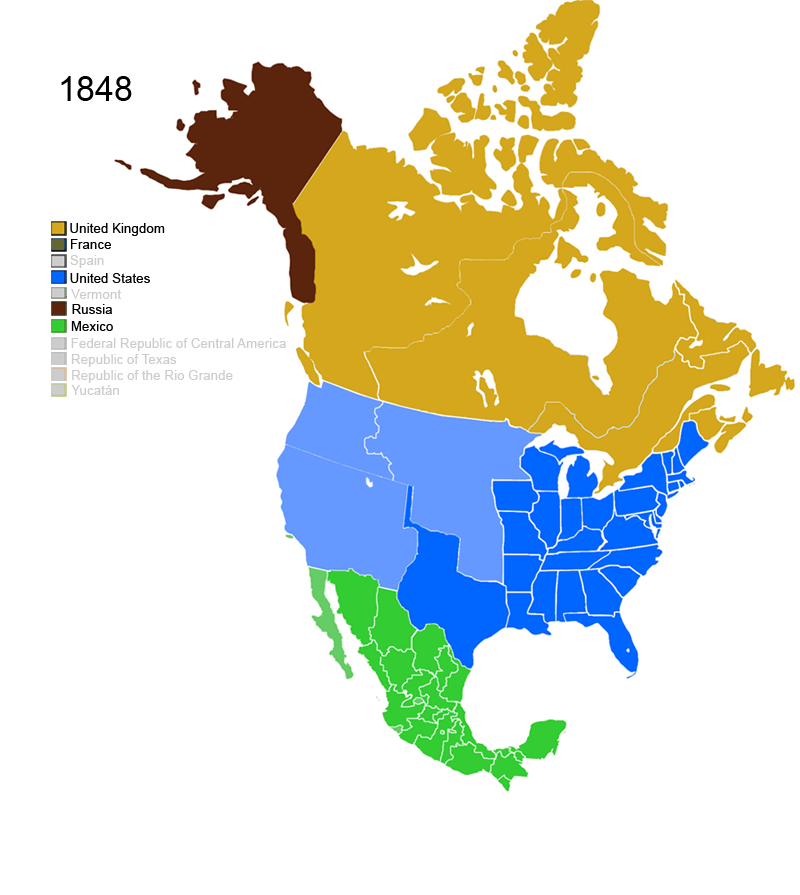

February 2, 1848

The Treaty of Guadalupe Hidalgo ended the Mexican–American War. Mexico ceded the Texas-claimed areas as well as a large area of land consisting of all of present-day California, Nevada, and Utah, most of Arizona, and portions of Colorado, New Mexico, and Wyoming.

August 17, 1848

The Republic of Yucatán rejoined Mexico after the Caste War of Yucatán forced them to seek outside help.

May 29, 1848

The southeastern portion of Wisconsin Territory was admitted to the US as the 30th state, Wisconsin. The remainder became unorganized.

August 14, 1848

Oregon Territory was organized, including present-day Idaho, northwestern Montana, Oregon, Washington, and western Wyoming.

== 1849 ==
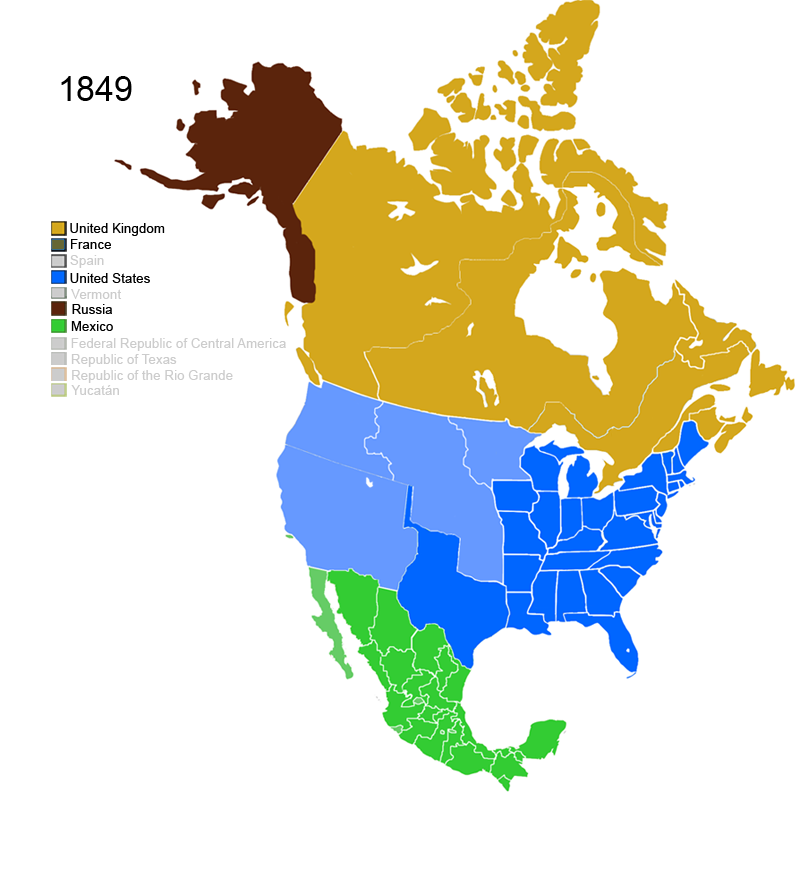

January 13, 1849

Colony of Vancouver Island is formed as a British crown colony.

March 3, 1849

Minnesota Territory was organized, consisting of present-day Minnesota, and eastern portions of North Dakota and South Dakota.

== 1850 ==
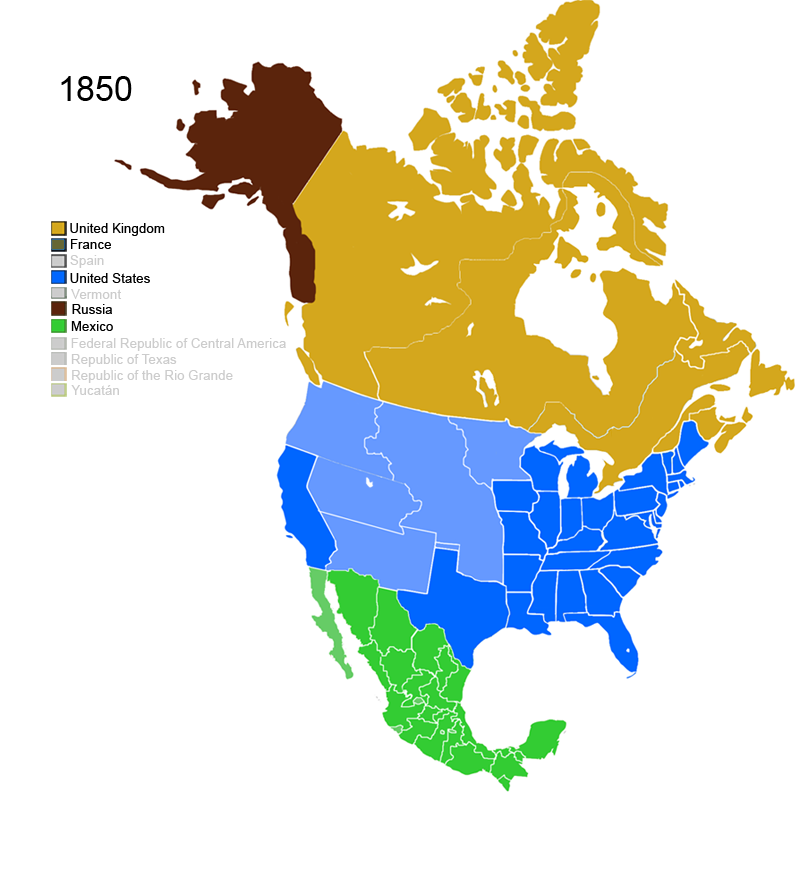

September 9, 1850

The Compromise of 1850 divided the Mexican Cession and land claimed by Texas but ceded to the federal government in exchange for taking on its debts. The western portion was admitted to the US as the 31st state, California, most of the rest was organized as Utah Territory and New Mexico Territory, and a small portion became unorganized land. New Mexico Territory consisted of most of present-day Arizona and New Mexico, as well as a southern portion of Colorado and the southern tip of Nevada. Utah Territory consisted of present-day Utah, most of Nevada, and portions of Colorado and Wyoming.

== 1853 ==
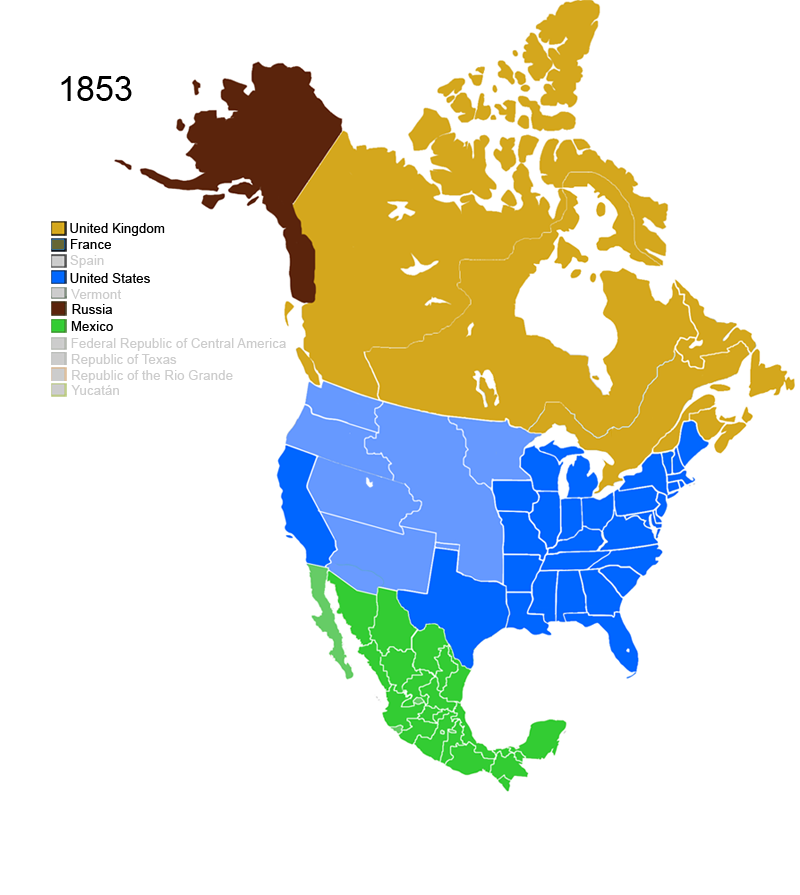

March 2, 1853

Washington Territory was split from Oregon Territory, consisting of present-day Washington, northern Idaho, and the western tip of Montana, leaving Oregon Territory with all of Oregon, southern Idaho and a portion of Wyoming.

December 30, 1853

The Gadsden Purchase added some land to New Mexico Territory, corresponding to the southernmost areas of present-day Arizona and New Mexico.

== May 30, 1854 ==
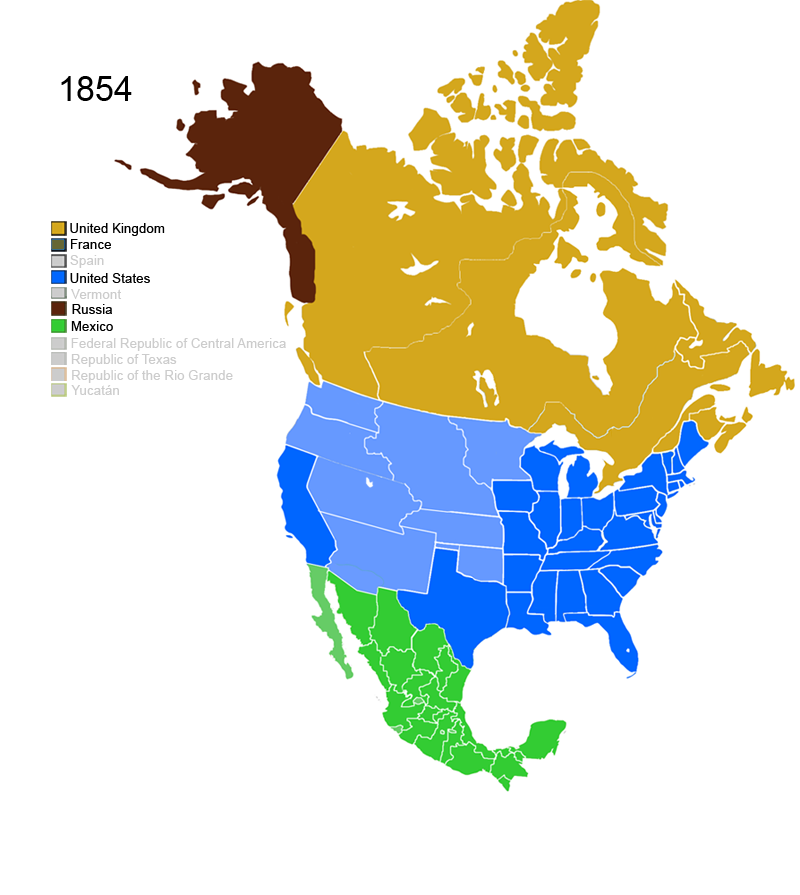

Kansas Territory and Nebraska Territory were organized; the remaining unorganized land colloquially became known as Indian Territory. Kansas Territory consisted of present-day Kansas and eastern Colorado. Nebraska Territory consisted of present-day Nebraska, and parts of Colorado, Montana, North Dakota, South Dakota, and Wyoming. Indian Territory corresponds to eastern Oklahoma.

A peculiarity appeared at this time, when a small strip of land north of Texas was not officially assigned by any state or territory; this came to be called the Neutral Strip or "No Man's Land", which corresponds to the present-day panhandle of Oklahoma.

== February 12, 1857 ==
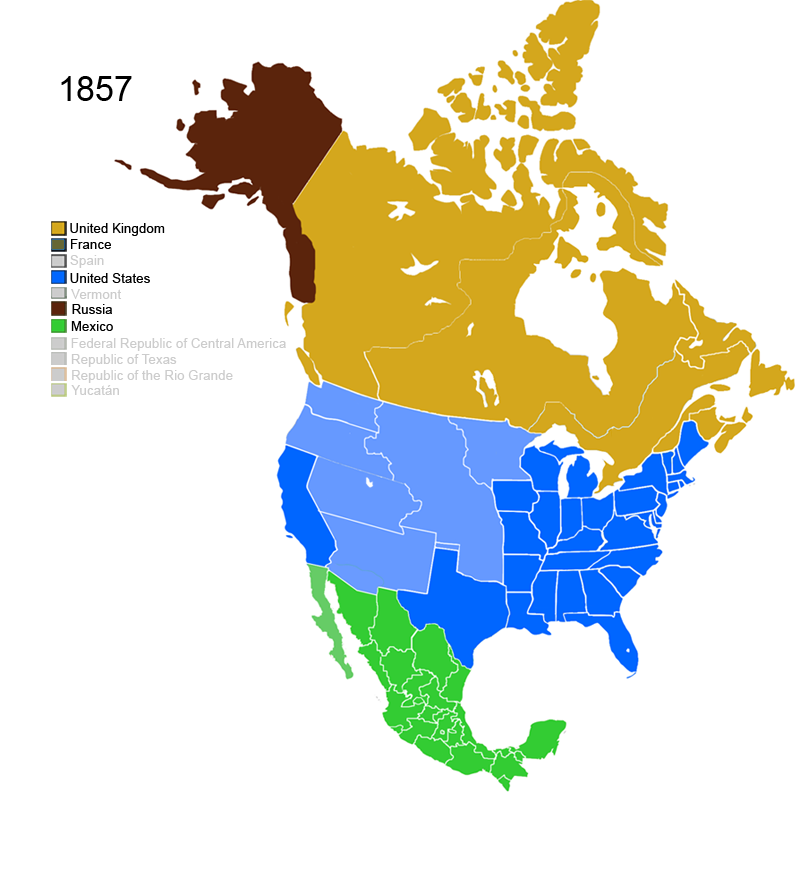

The 1857 Constitution of Mexico was adopted, reorganizing some states. Nuevo León is merged into Coahuila; Aguascalientes, Colima, and Tlaxcala all had their status changed from territory to state; and the state of Guerrero was created from portions of México and Puebla.

== 1858 ==
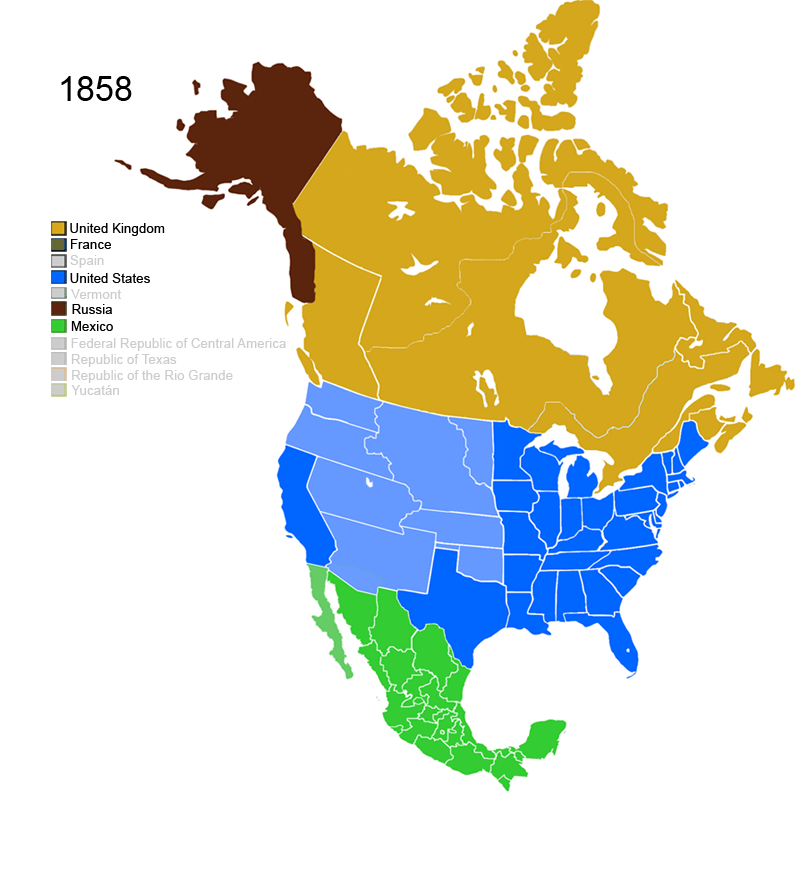

August 2, 1858

The Colony of British Columbia was a crown colony in British North America from 1858 until 1871.

May 11, 1858

The eastern portion of Minnesota Territory was admitted to the US as the 32nd state, Minnesota. The remainder became unorganized.

== 1859 ==
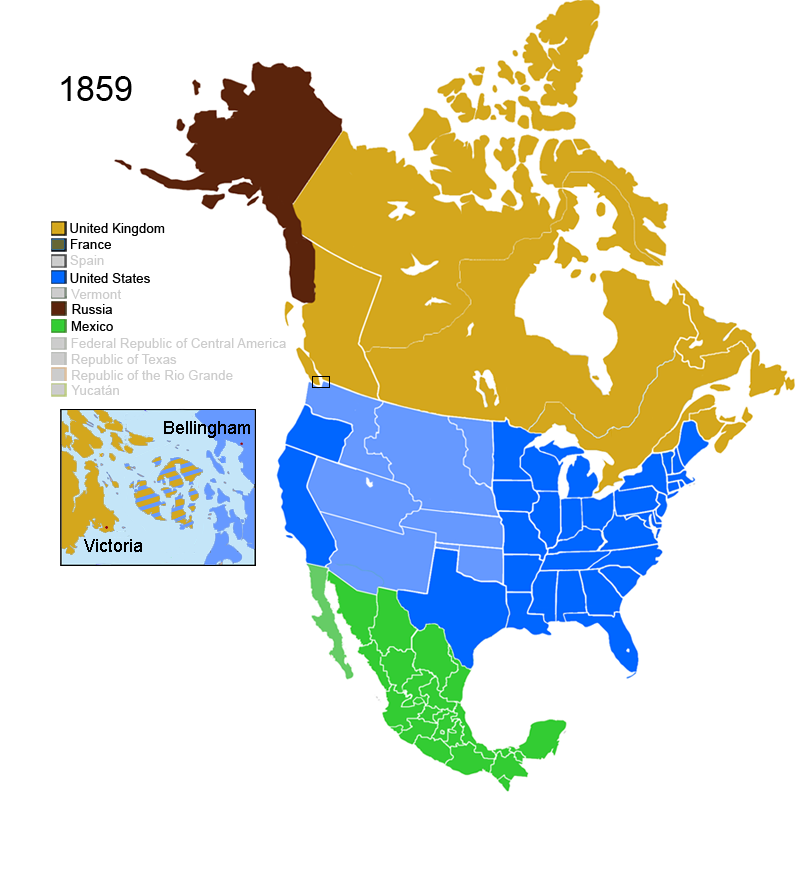

February 14, 1859

The western portion of Oregon Territory was admitted to the US as the 33rd state, Oregon. The remainder was assigned to Washington Territory.

1859

A boundary commission was set up to delineate the border between Vancouver Island and the Washington State coast. The commission could not come to agreement on where the middle of the Strait was so in 1859 things came to a head during the bloodless Pig War.

== 1861 ==
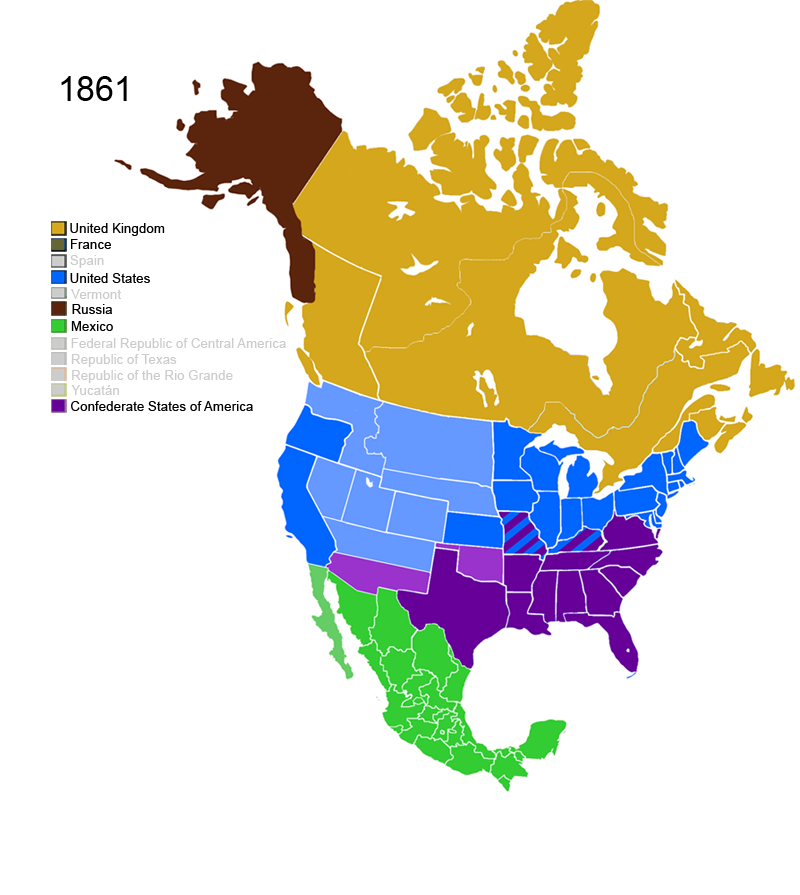

January 29, 1861

The eastern portion of Kansas Territory was admitted as the 34th state, Kansas. The western portion was added to Colorado Territory on February 28, 1861, but for the month between statehood for Kansas and the formation of Colorado Territory, it appears to have had no official status.

March 4, 1861

The Confederate States of America (CSA) was formed. The Southern states seceded at different dates and joined the CSA at different dates; to simplify the map, only the final form of the CSA is shown here. There were rebel governments as well as Union governments in Kentucky and Missouri, and the CSA had full control over Indian Territory. To view a detailed animated map depicting the various state secessions see CSA states evolution.

February 28, 1861

Colorado Territory was organized, with land from Utah, New Mexico, and Nebraska Territories, as well as the land left over from Kansas Territory; it corresponded already to present-day Colorado. Also, the eastern tip of Washington Territory was transferred to Nebraska Territory.

== July 14, 1862 ==
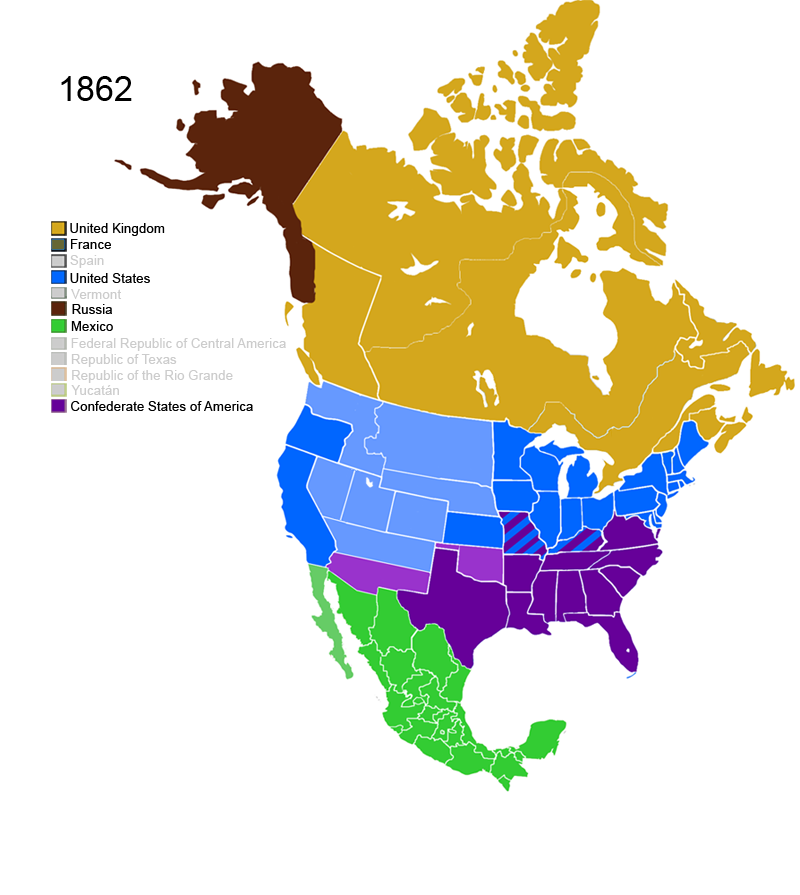

Due to its nature as a mining and grazing area, land started to be added to Nevada Territory to accommodate these activities. Its eastern border was moved eastward from the 39th meridian west from Washington, to the 38th meridian west from Washington, transferring the land from Utah Territory.

== 1863 ==
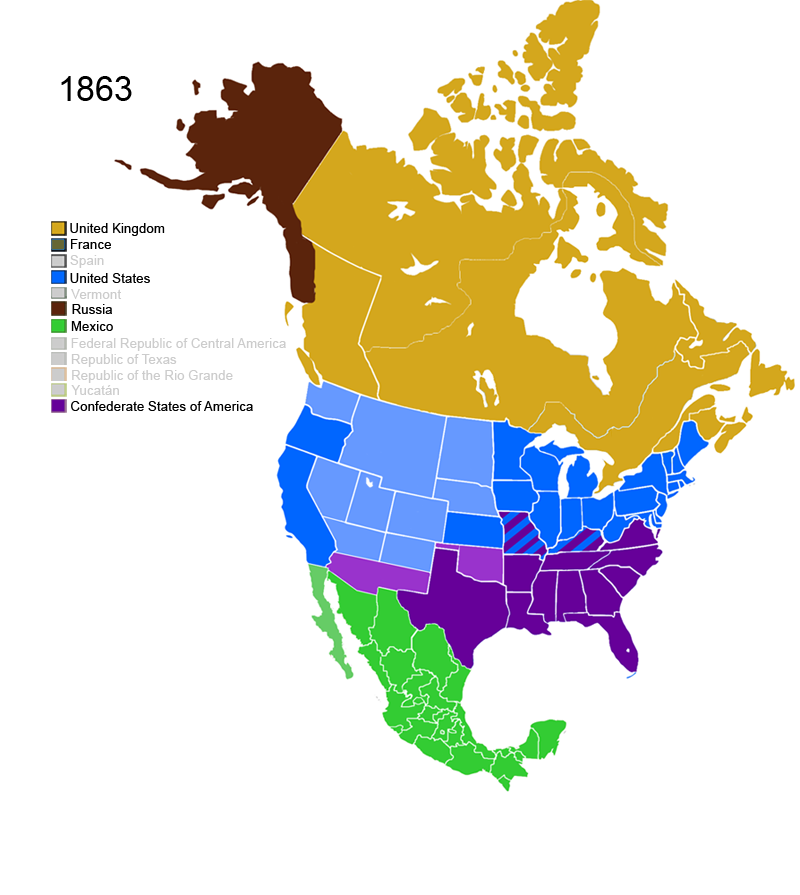

April 29, 1863

The Mexican state of Campeche was split from Yucatán.

February 24, 1863

The Union created its own Arizona Territory, splitting it off from New Mexico Territory, making both territories correspond to their present-day states, except for Arizona Territory including the southern tip of present-day Nevada.

March 4, 1863

Idaho Territory was created from portions of Washington, Dakota, and Nebraska Territories, consisting of present-day Idaho, Montana, and most of Wyoming. Nebraska and Washington Territories were left corresponding to their present-day counterparts.

June 20, 1863

Several counties of northwestern Virginia who did not want to be part of the Confederacy split off and were admitted to the US as the 35th state, West Virginia.

== 1864 ==
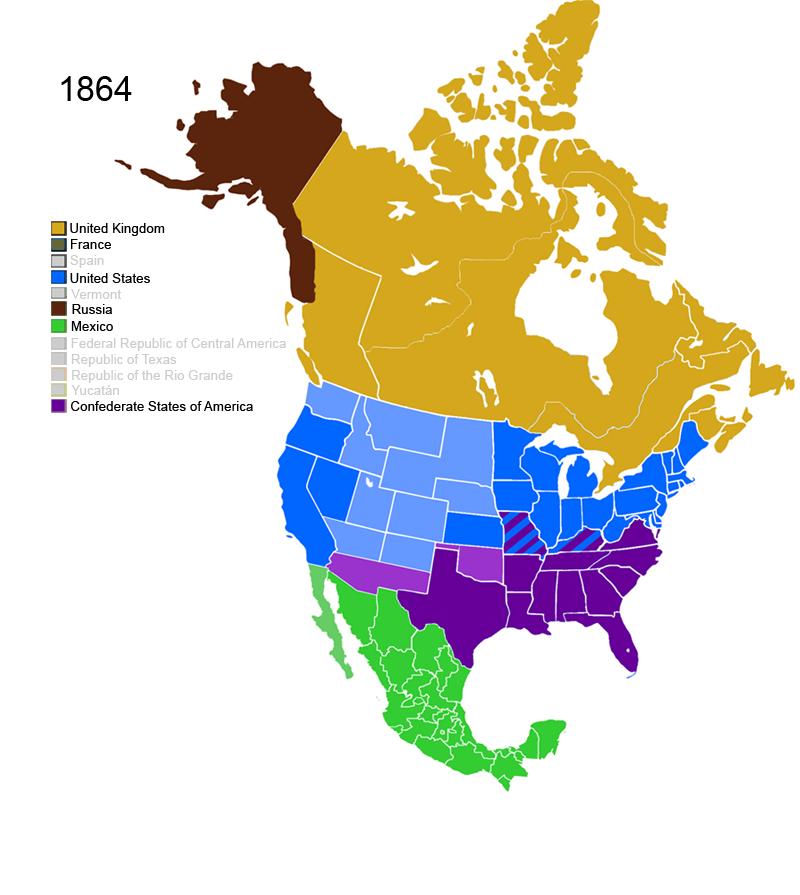

February 26, 1864

The Mexican state of Nuevo León was re-split from Coahuila.

May 26, 1864

Montana Territory was split from Idaho Territory, which also had some land transferred to Dakota Territory. Montana Territory corresponded to present-day Montana, Idaho Territory consisted of Idaho and western Wyoming, and Dakota Territory included both North and South Dakota, and most of Wyoming.

October 31, 1864

Nevada Territory was admitted to the US as the 36th state, Nevada; it was a bit smaller than it is today, lacking area in both the east and south.

== 1865 ==
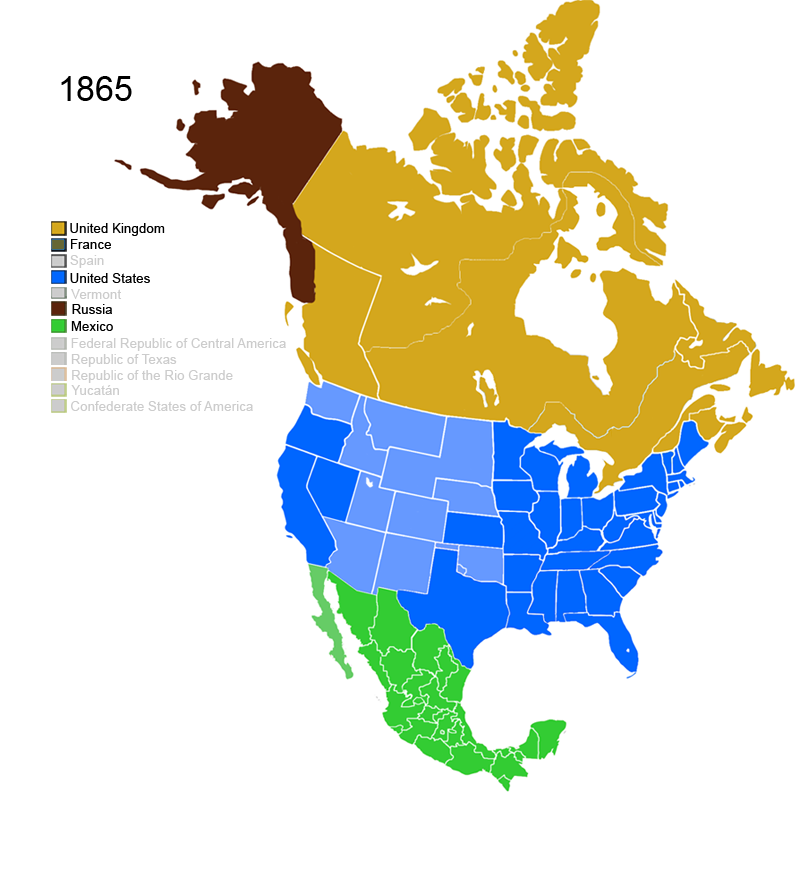

April 9, 1865

The Confederate States of America surrendered. The process of Reconstruction and readmission to the union would take several years; to simplify the map, they are shown as already readmitted. To view a detailed animated map depicting the various state readmission during Reconstruction see CSA states evolution.

== 1866 ==
August 2, 1866

Colony of Vancouver Island and Colony of British Columbia merge to form the united Colony of British Columbia.

== 1867 ==
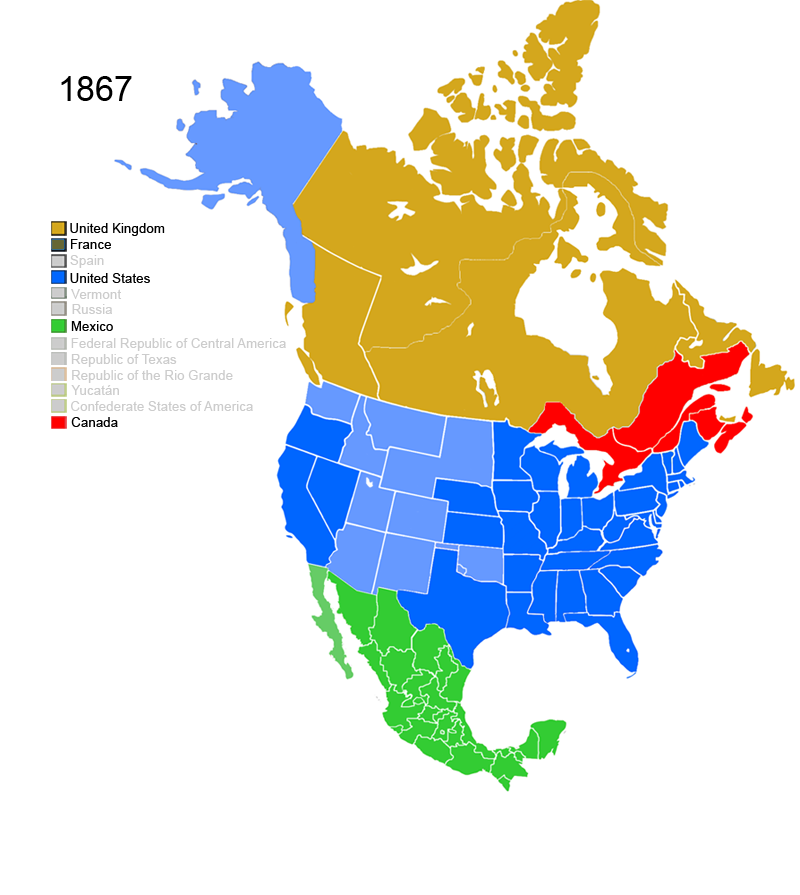

January 18, 1867

Nevada's eastern border was moved from the 38th meridian west from Washington, to the 37th meridian west from Washington, transferring land to it from Utah Territory. Also, the northwestern corner of Arizona Territory was transferred to the state of Nevada, giving it its present-day borders.

March 1, 1867

Nebraska Territory was admitted to the US as the 37th state, Nebraska.

July 1, 1867

Canada was formed from three provinces of British North America: the Province of Canada, which was split into the provinces of Ontario and Quebec, and the colonies of New Brunswick and Nova Scotia.

At this time, though, Canada did not become independent according to the modern meaning of the word. The Statute of Westminster 1931 made Canada much closer to being independent, but not completely.

October 11, 1867

The United States purchased Alaska from Russia; it was designated the Department of Alaska, and corresponds, except for a boundary dispute, to present-day Alaska. The United States Senate approved the purchase of Alaska from Russia for $7,200,000 (US$165,857,142.86 in 2025) on April 9, 1867.

== 1868 ==
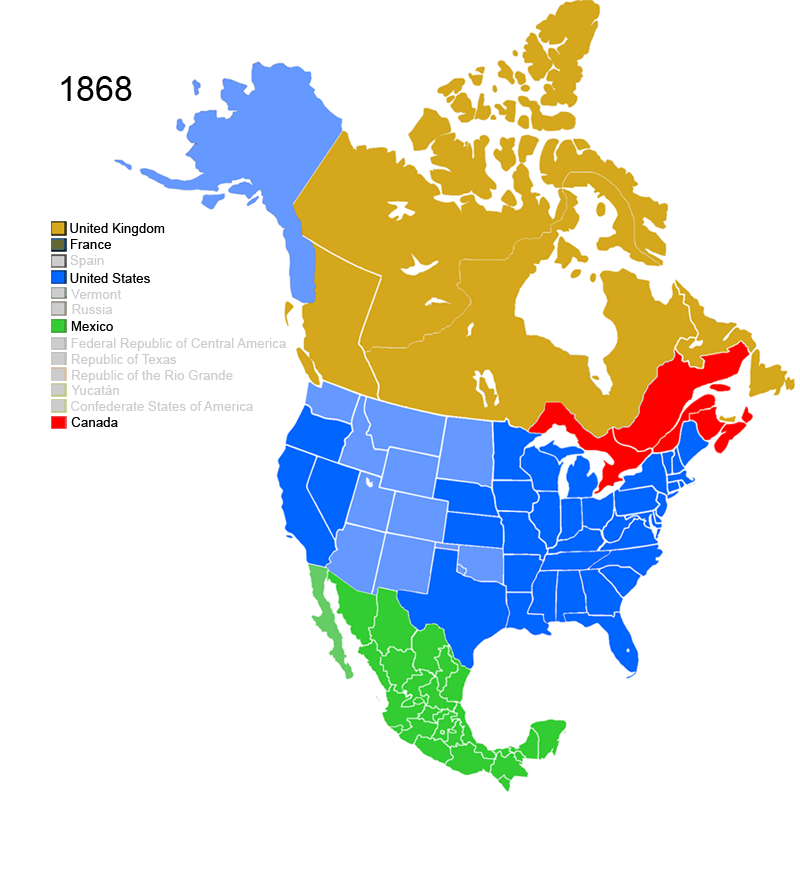

July 25, 1868

Wyoming Territory was formed from portions of Dakota, Idaho, and Utah Territories, corresponding to the present-day borders of Wyoming. Idaho Territory then corresponds to present day Idaho, and Utah Territory to present-day Utah.

== 1869 ==
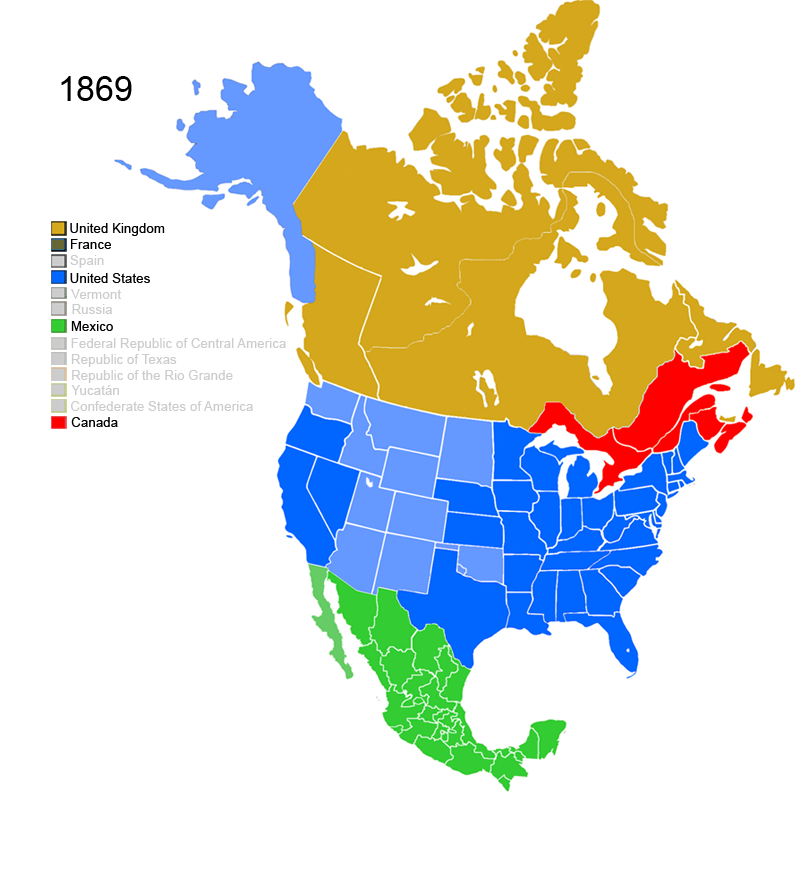

January 15, 1869

The Mexican state of Hidalgo was split from the state of México.

April 16, 1869

The Mexican state of Morelos was split from the state of México.

== July 15, 1870 ==
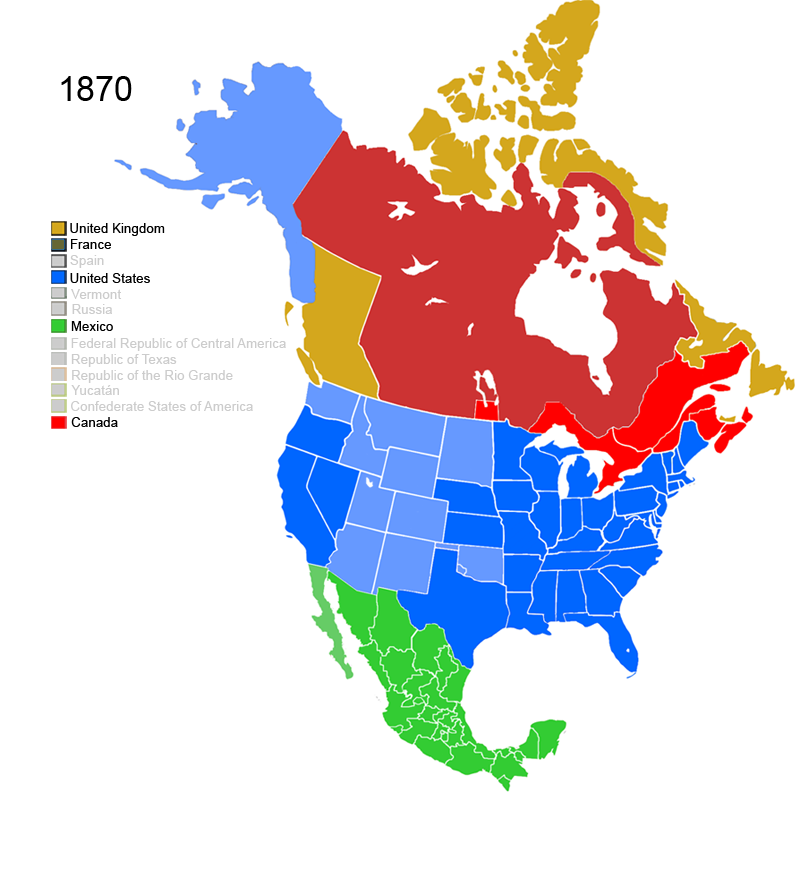

The United Kingdom ceded most of its remaining land in North America to Canada, with Rupert's Land and the North-Western Territory becoming the North-West Territories. The Rupert's Land Act 1868 transferred the region to Canada as of 1869, but it was only consummated in 1870 when £300,000 were paid to the Hudson's Bay Company. At this time, the Manitoba Act took effect, and a small square of the newly acquired region surrounding the city of Winnipeg was made the province of Manitoba.

Unlike what this map shows, the actual border between Newfoundland & Quebec is still unknown. Mapmakers mostly made their own guesses until 1927, pretending that the border was more known than it really was. The problem didn't stop in 1927 (see 1927).

== July 20, 1871 ==
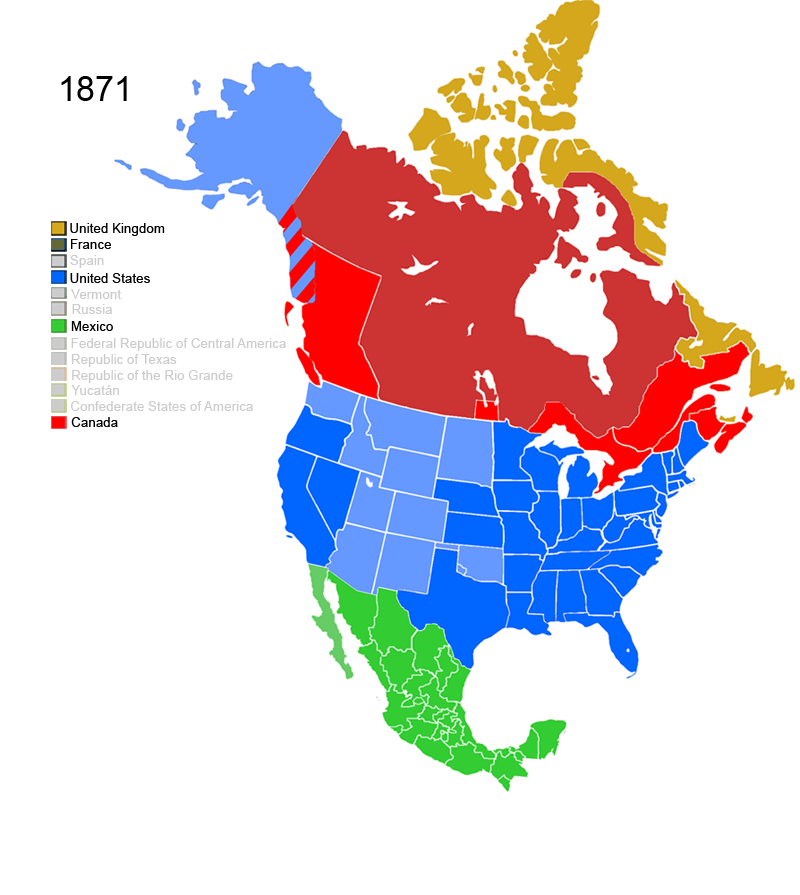

The British colony of British Columbia joined Canada as the sixth province. British Columbia joined the Canadian confederation following The Great Confederation Debates in the spring of 1870 and the Confederation Negotiations of the following summer and winter.

== October 21, 1872 ==
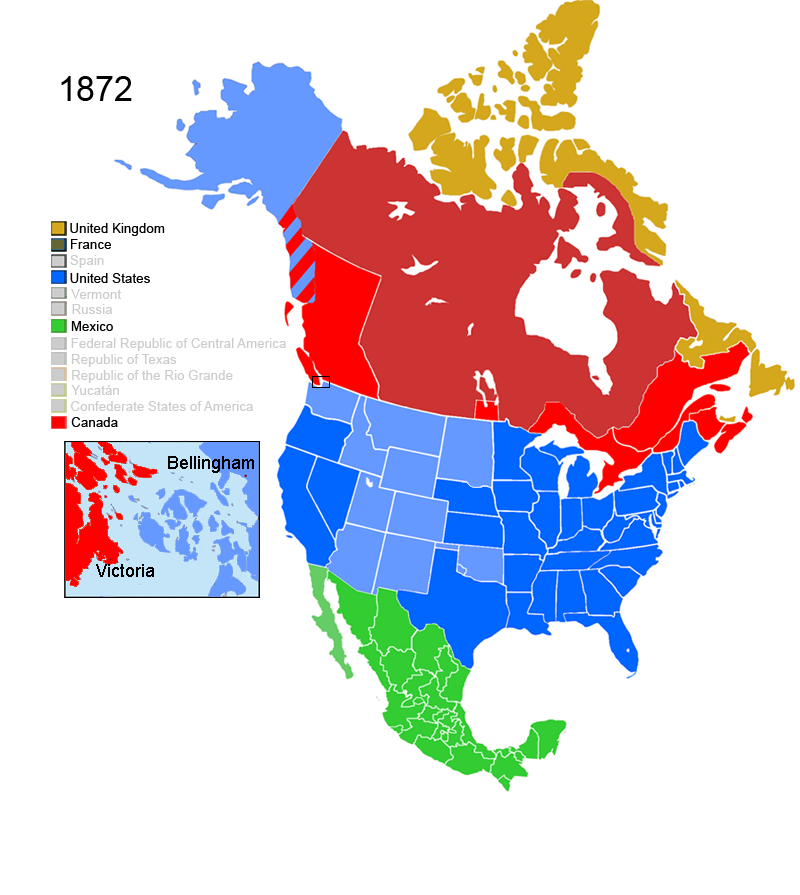

The San Juan Islands were awarded to the US, formally ending the Pig War with Britain.

== July 1, 1873 ==
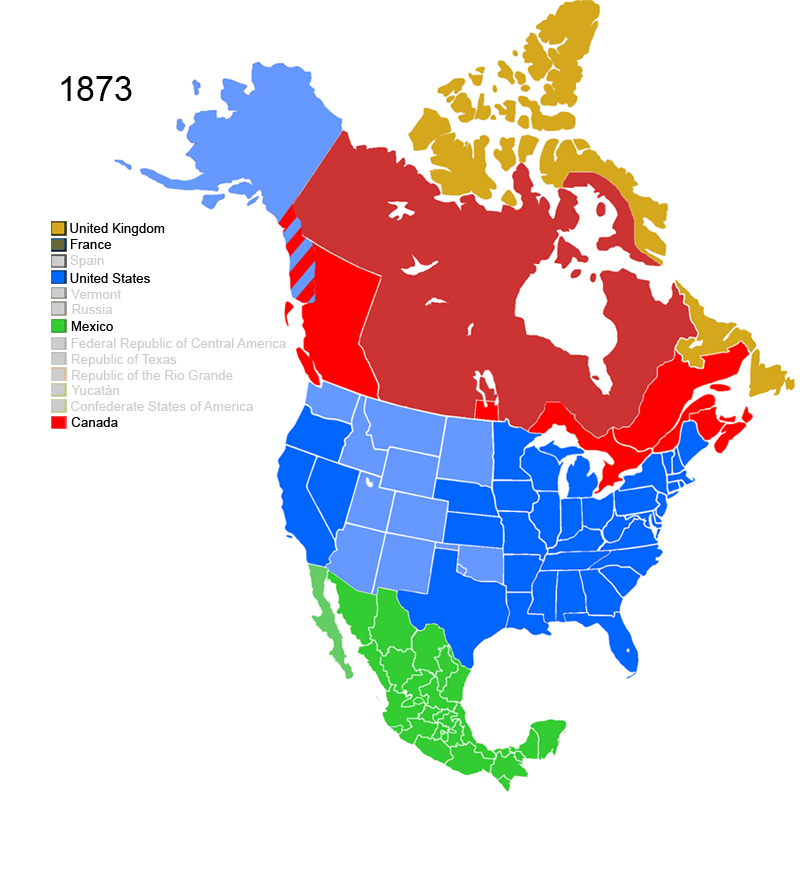

The British colony of Prince Edward Island joined Canada as the seventh province by an Act of Parliament (and, as part of the terms of union, was guaranteed a ferry link, a term which was deleted upon completion of the Confederation Bridge in 1997).

== July 26, 1874 ==
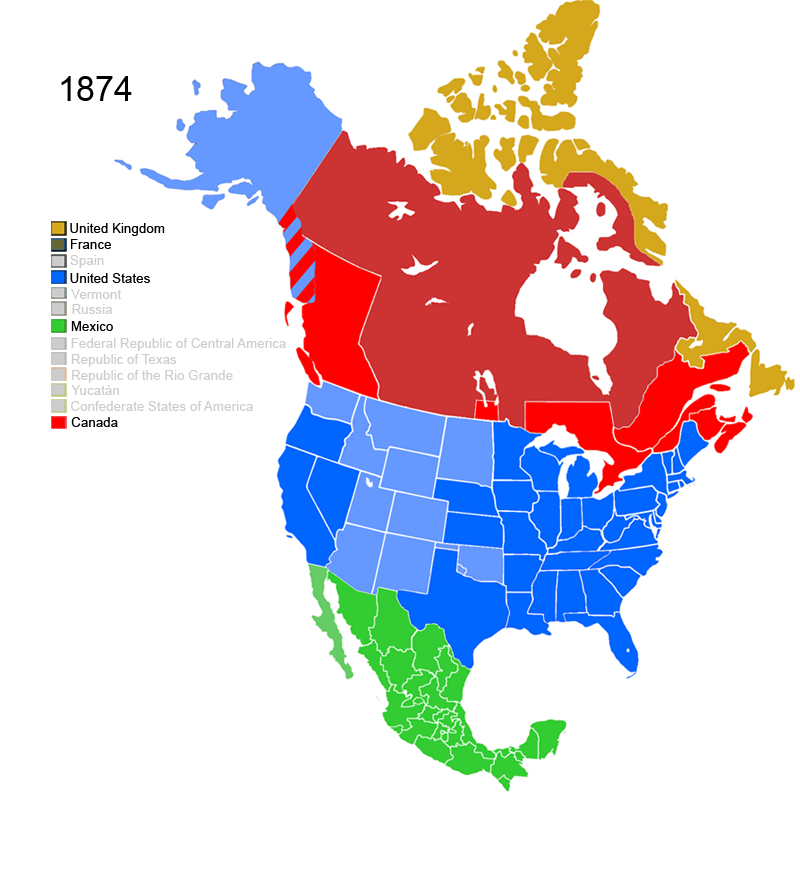

The borders of Ontario were provisionally expanded north and west. When the Province of Canada was formed, its borders were not entirely clear, and Ontario claimed to eventually reach all the way to the Rocky Mountains and Arctic Ocean. With Canada's acquisition of Rupert's Land, Ontario was interested in clearly defining its borders, especially since some of the new areas it was interested in were rapidly growing. After the federal government asked Ontario to pay for construction in the new disputed area, the province asked for an elaboration on its limits, and its boundary was moved north to the 51st parallel north.

== 1876 ==
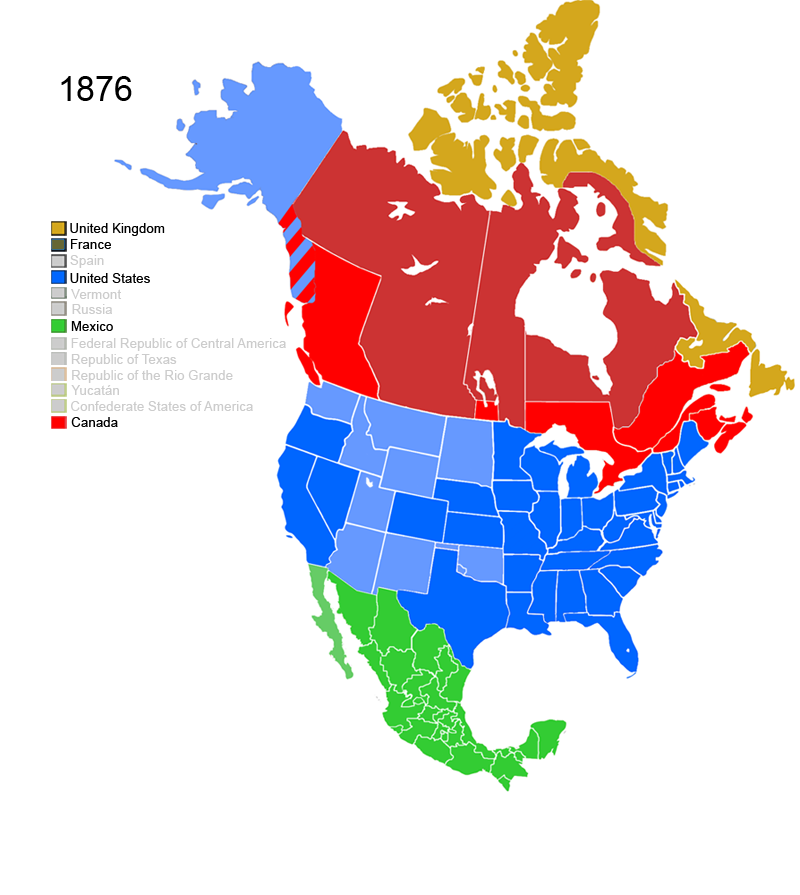

April 12, 1876

The District of Keewatin was created by the passage of the Keewatin Act on April 12, 1876, in a central separate strip from the North-West Territories, in order to provide government for the growing area north of Manitoba and west of Ontario.

August 1, 1876

Colorado Territory was admitted to the US as the 38th state, Colorado.

== February 8, 1879 ==
Arenas Key is claimed for the United States under the Guano Islands Act

== 1880 ==
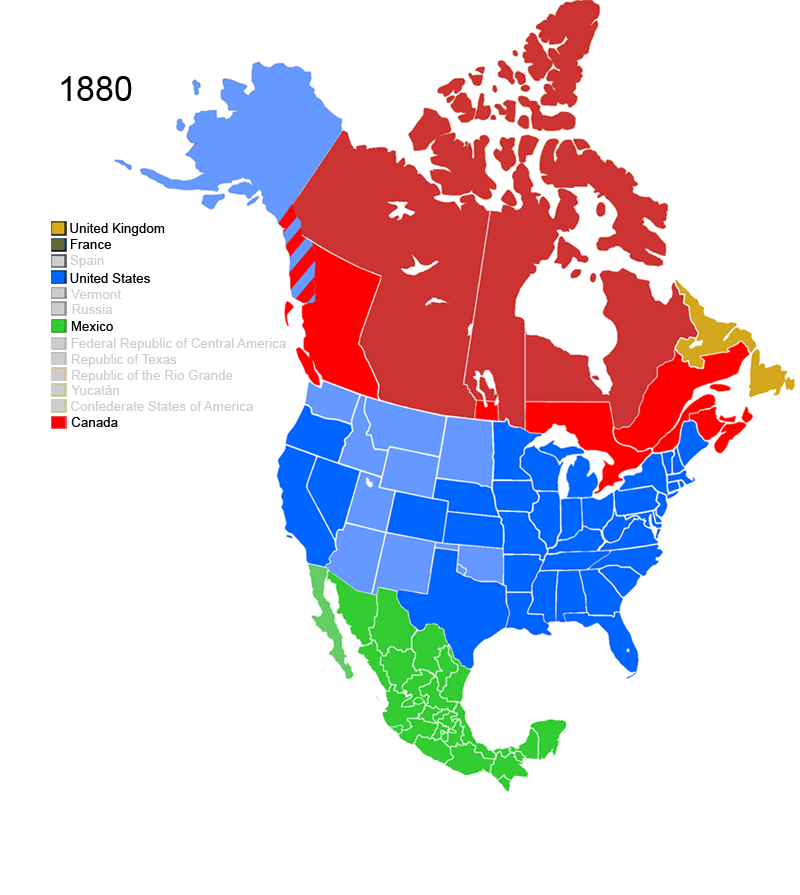

September 1, 1880

The United Kingdom ceded its Arctic Islands to Canada, and they were made part of the North-West Territories.

September 13, 1880

The Western Triangle Islands are claimed for the United States under the Guano Islands Act.

== July 1, 1881 ==
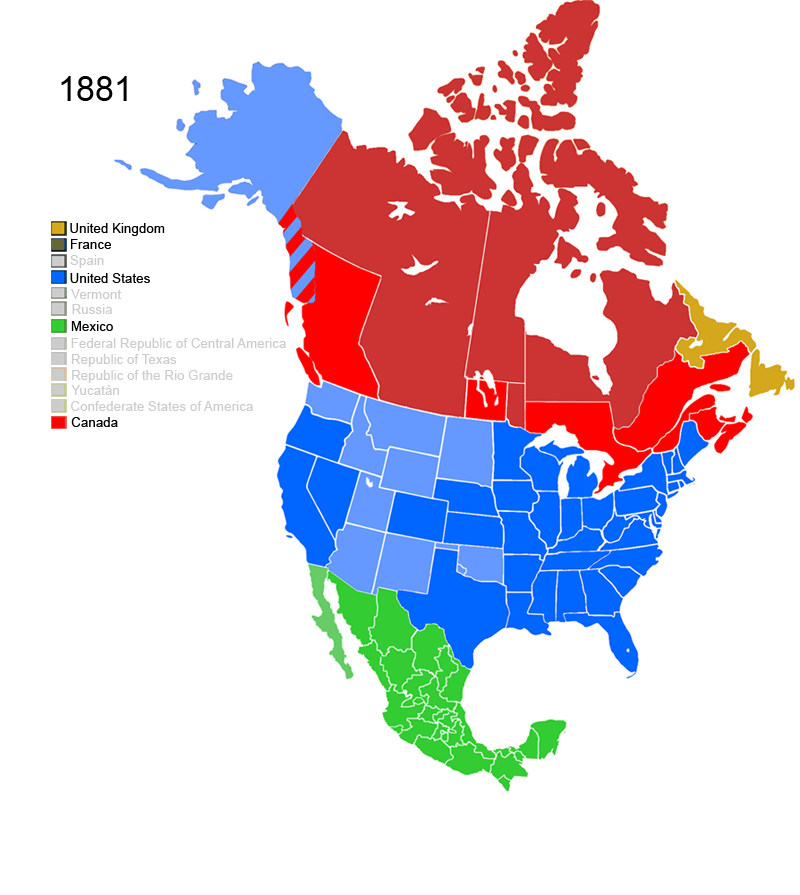

Manitoba's borders were expanded to a larger postage stamp province taking land easterly from the District of Keewatin to the western boundary of Ontario. Since the province's eastern border was defined as the "western boundary of Ontario", the exact definition of which was still unclear, Ontario disputed a portion of the new region.

== March 28, 1882 ==
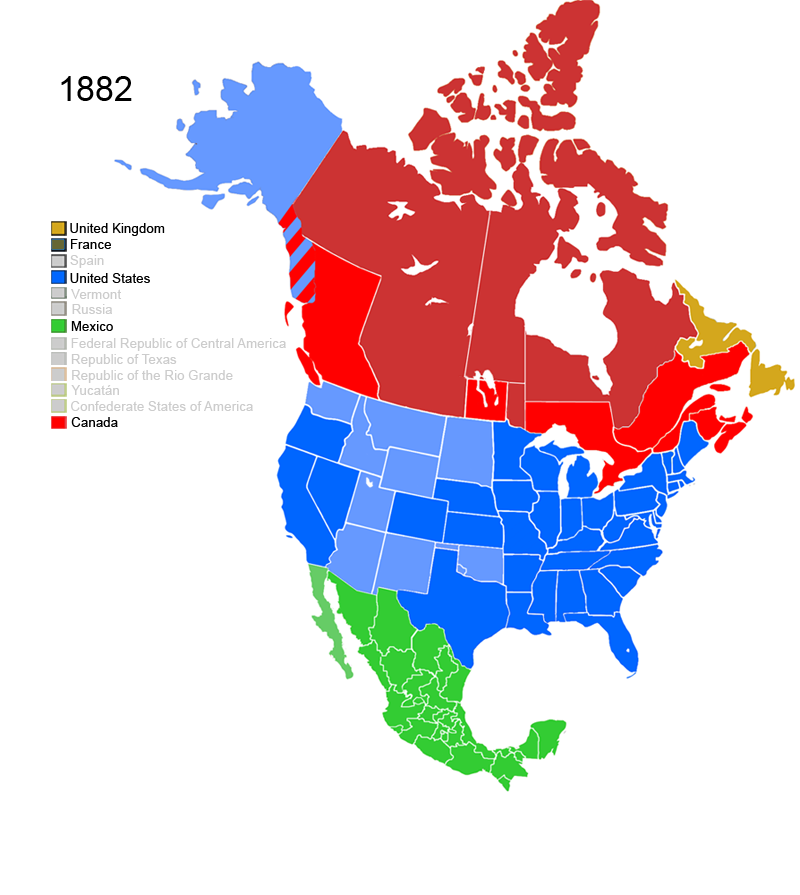

The part of Dakota Territory south of 43° north and north of the Keya Paha and Niobrara Rivers was transferred to Nebraska.

== 1884 ==
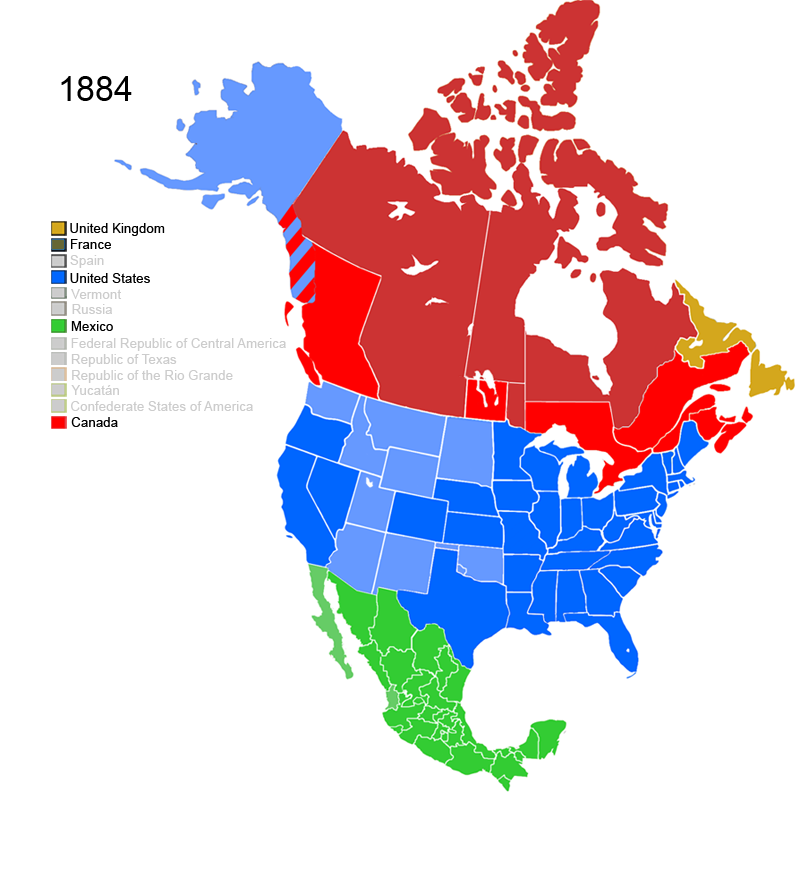

June 21, 1884

The Islands of Perez Chica and Pajora of the Alacrene Islands in the bay of Campeche are claimed for the United States under the Guano Islands Act.

December 12, 1884

The Mexican territory of Tepic was split from the state of Jalisco.

== May 7, 1886 ==
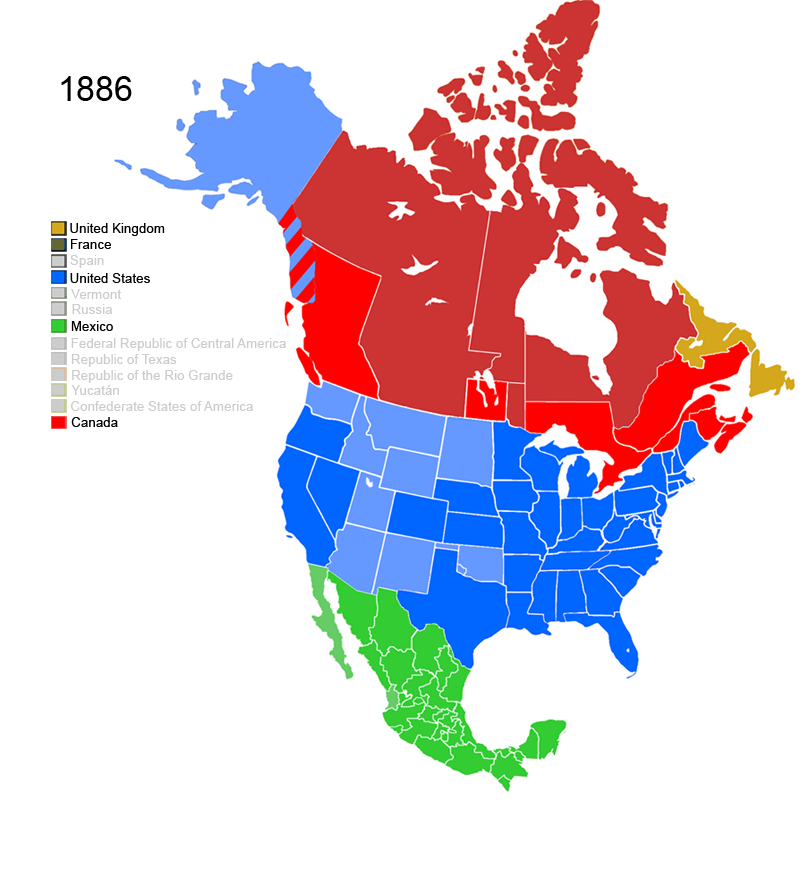

The southwestern border of the District of Keewatin was adjusted to conform to the boundaries of the new provisional districts of the North-West Territories created in 1882, returning some land to the North-West Territories. The provisional districts were the District of Alberta, the District of Athabasca, District of Assiniboia and the District of Saskatchewan, which all remained administrative areas of the North-West Territories, unlike the District of Keewatin.

== 1889 ==
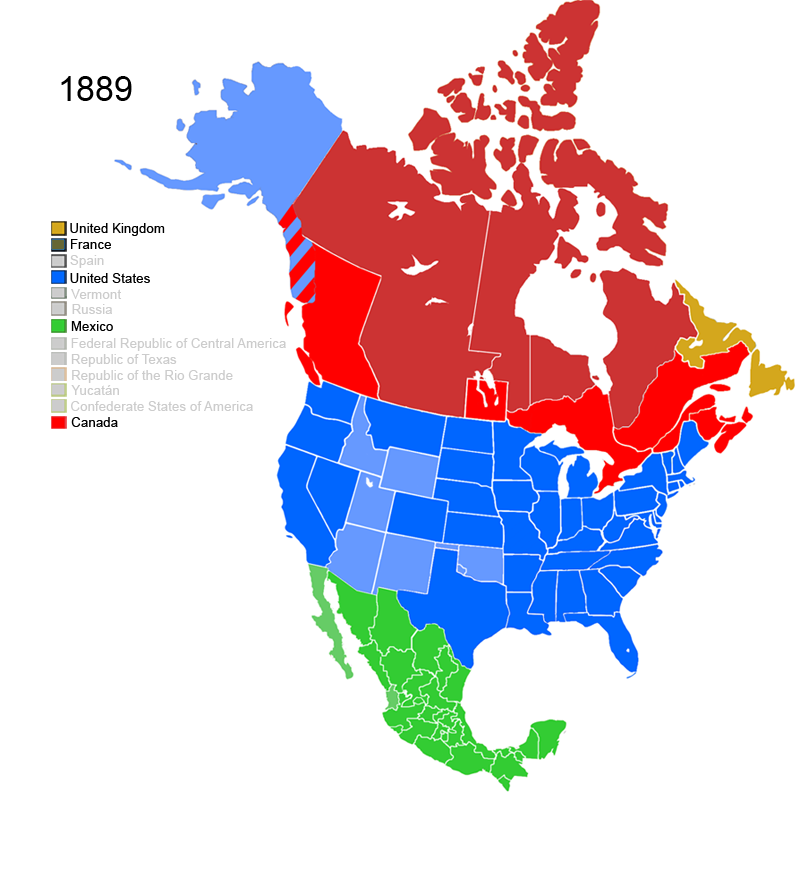

November 2, 1889

Dakota Territory was split in two, and it was admitted to the US as the 39th state, North Dakota, and 40th state, South Dakota.

November 8, 1889

Montana Territory was admitted to the US as the 41st state, Montana.

November 11, 1889

Washington Territory was admitted to the US as the 42nd state, Washington.

August 12, 1889

The dispute between Manitoba and Ontario ended as Ontario's borders were finalized in accordance with the Canada (Ontario Boundary) Act, 1889, which extended the province west to the Lake of the Woods and north to the Albany River.

== 1890 ==
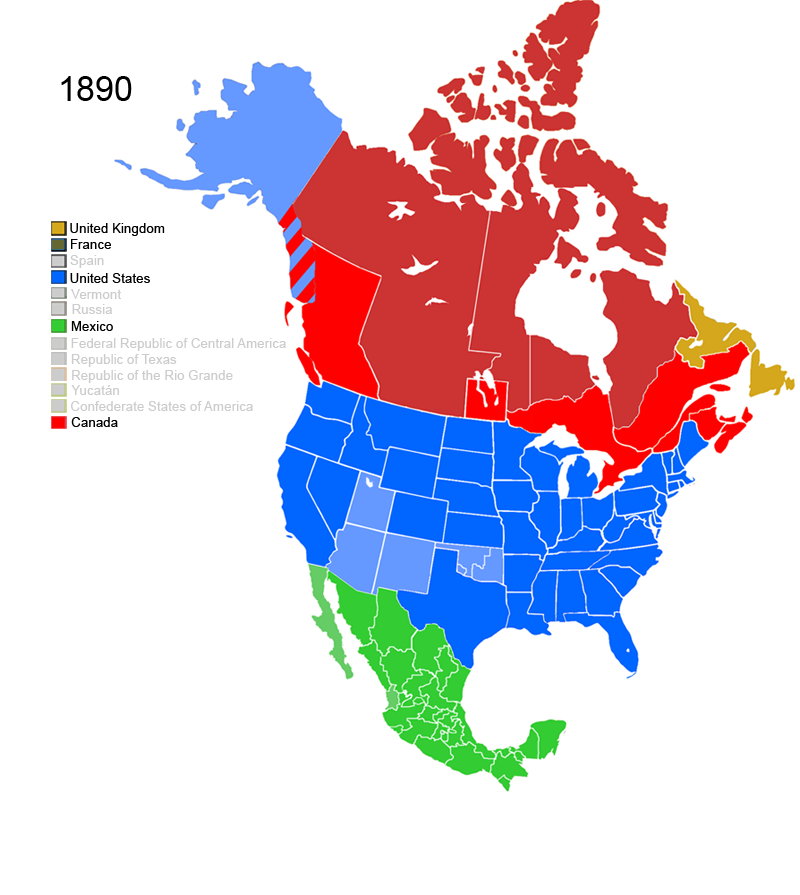

May 2, 1890

Oklahoma Territory was organized from the western portion of Indian Territory, and included the Neutral Strip, corresponding to the western half of present-day Oklahoma.

July 3, 1890

Idaho Territory was admitted to the US as the 43rd state, Idaho.

July 10, 1890

Wyoming Territory was admitted to the US as the 44th state, Wyoming.

== November 24, 1894 ==
The American claims over Western Triangle Island, the Alacrans Islands (Isla Pérez, Isla Desertora, Isla Pajaros, Isla Chica, and Isla Desterrada), and Arenas Key are all waived by the American government in favor of Mexico.

== October 2, 1895 ==
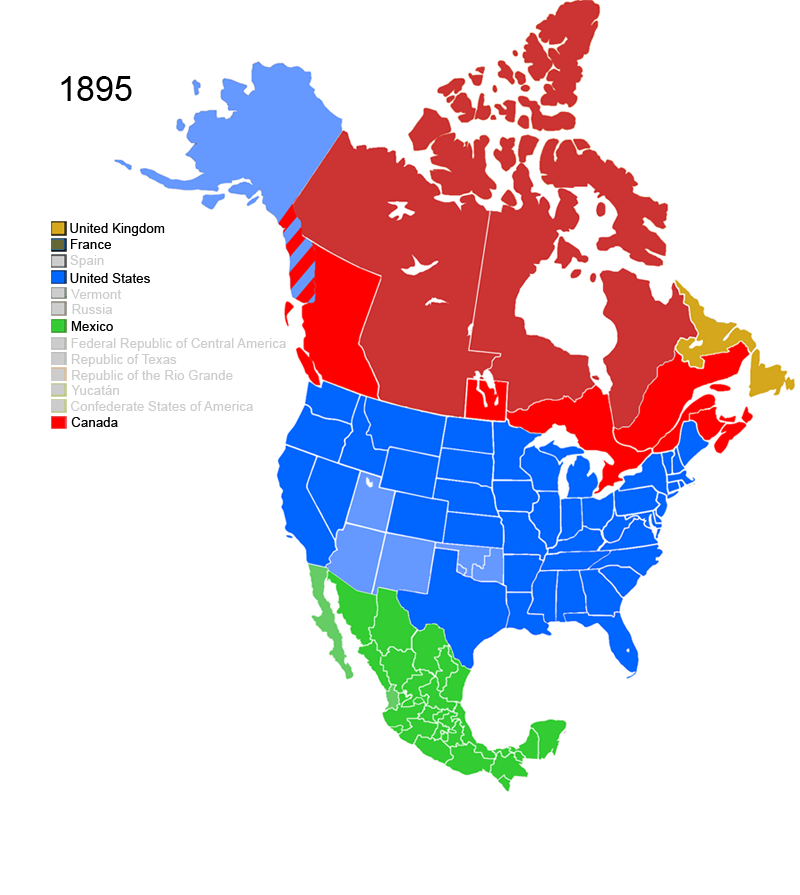

Keewatin covered the portion of the North-West Territories north of Manitoba on the mainland, and all islands within Hudson, James, and Ungava Bays. The portion between the District of Keewatin, Ontario, and Hudson Bay was not in a district, and was assigned to the District of Keewatin by an Order of Council. Four additional provisional districts of the North-West Territories were formed, the District of Yukon, the District of Ungava, the District of Mackenzie, and the District of Franklin.

== 1896 ==
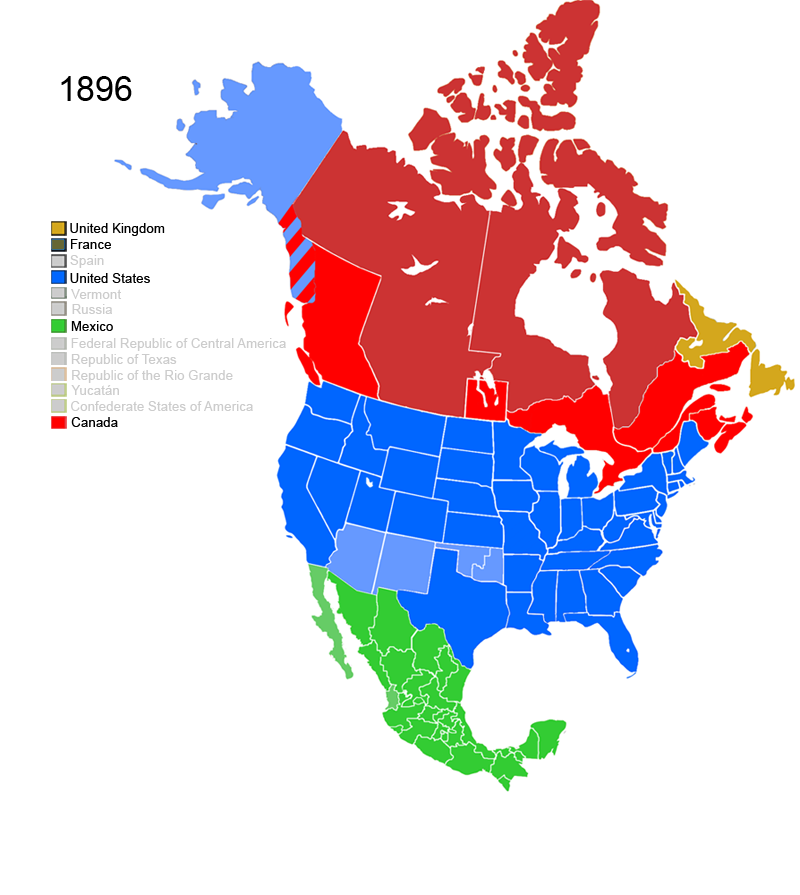

January 4, 1896

Utah Territory was admitted to the US as the 45th state, Utah.

May 4, 1896

A Supreme Court ruling officially assigns Greer County to Oklahoma Territory.

== 1897 ==
The borders of the District of Keewatin were adjusted. Southampton Island, Coats Island, Mansel Island, Akimiski Island, and other islands were transferred to Keewatin. (Note: Not shown on the map as maritime borders are not displayed)

== June 13, 1898 ==
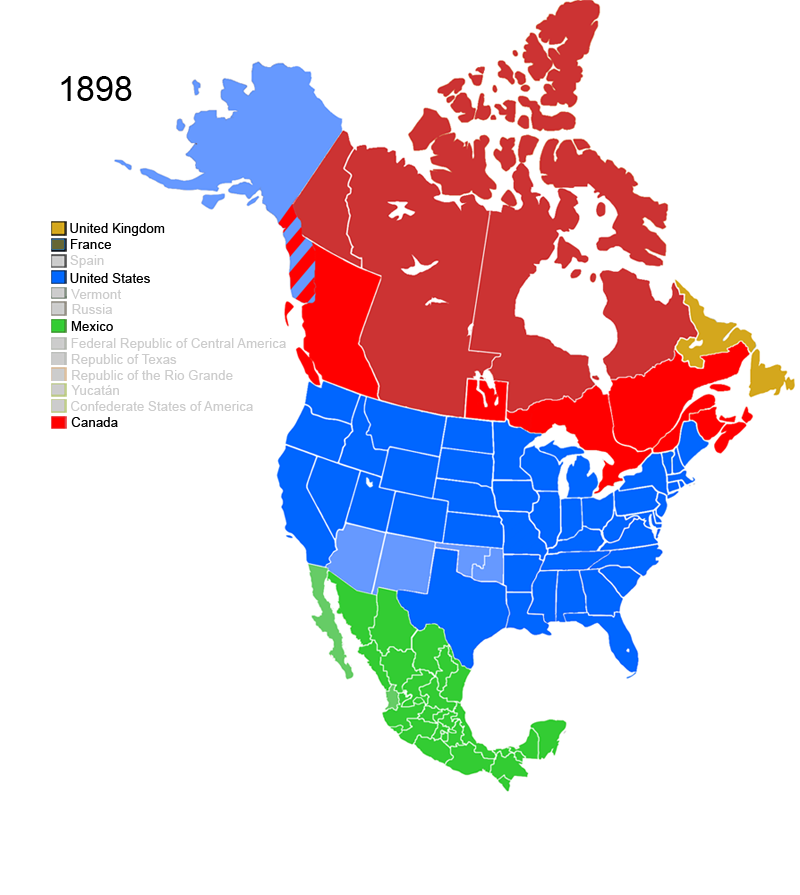

Yukon Territory was created from the District of Yukon in the northwestern part of the North-West Territories, and the Quebec Boundary Extension Act, 1898 expanded the borders of Quebec north to the Eastmain River.

== May 23, 1901 ==
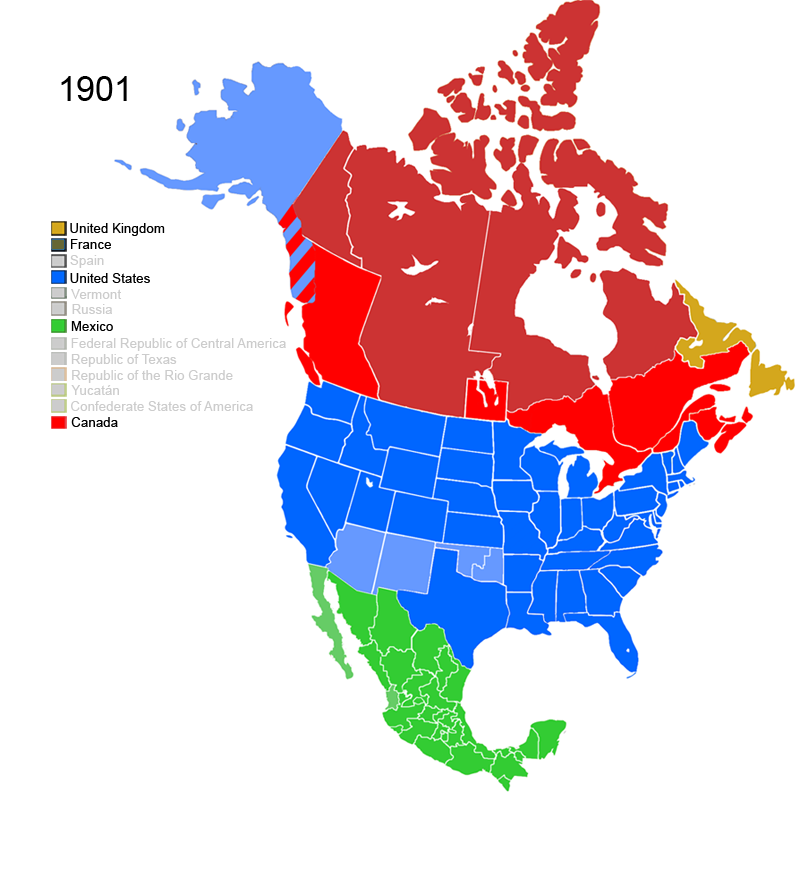

The eastern border of Yukon Territory was adjusted to the eastern edge of the Peel River watershed, and also to include some more islands.

== November 24, 1902 ==
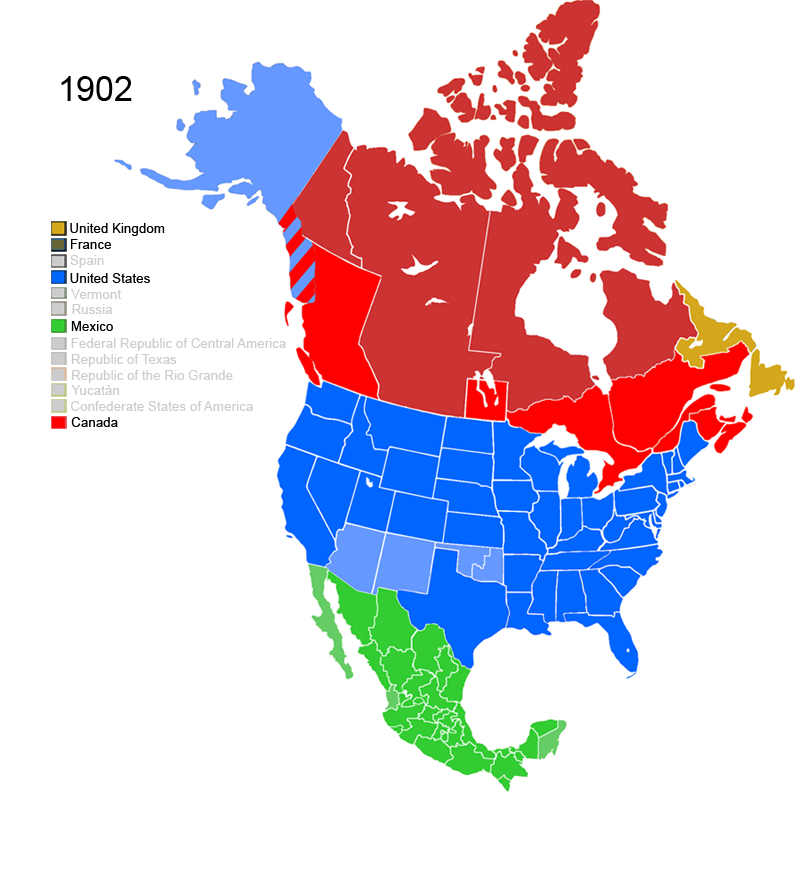

The Mexican territory of Quintana Roo was split from the state of Yucatán.

== 1903 ==
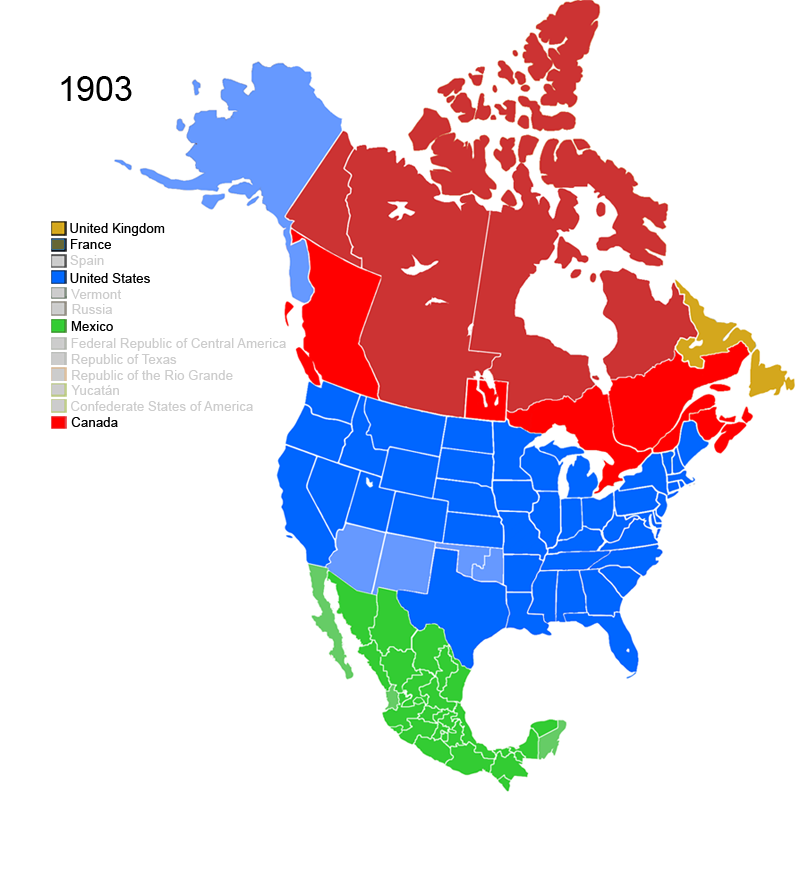

The Alaska Boundary Dispute was a territorial dispute between the United States and Canada (then a British Dominion with its foreign affairs controlled from London), and at a subnational level between Alaska on the US side and British Columbia and the Yukon on the Canadian side. It was resolved by arbitration in 1903, generally favoring the American claim.

== September 1, 1905 ==
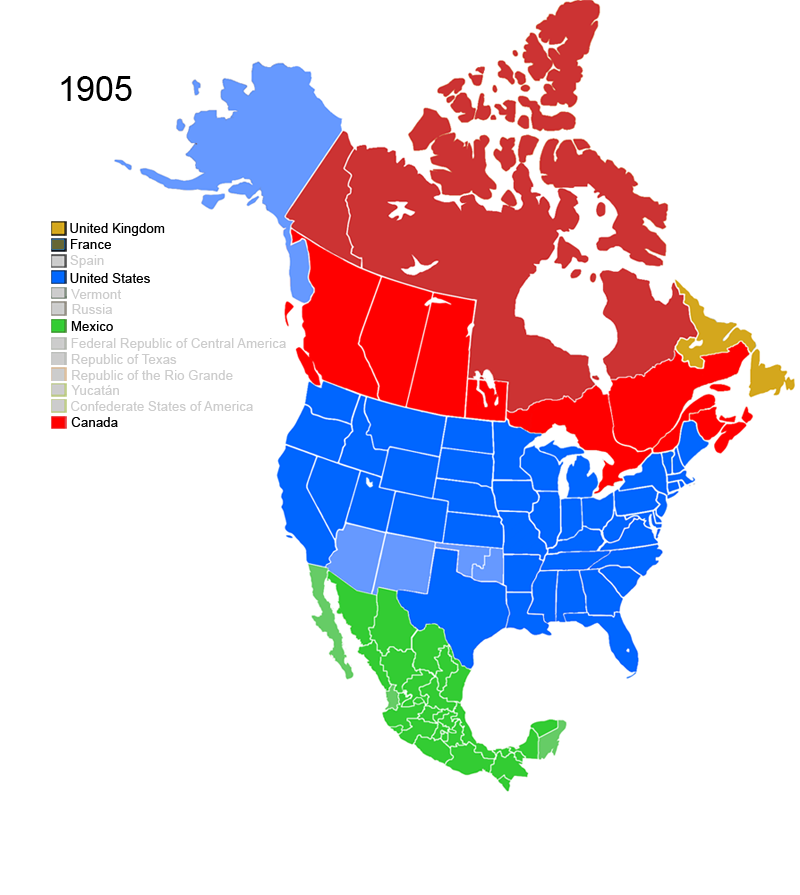

The provinces of Alberta and Saskatchewan were created from the North-West Territories. Saskatchewan's western border and Alberta's eastern border run concurrent with the 4th meridian^{[A]} or the 110°W longitude. Saskatchewan's eastern border is not a meridian, but instead follows a staircase-shaped Dominion Land Survey range line. Alberta's southern and northern borders are the same as Saskatchewan's: the southern border is the Canada–United States border or the 49th parallel and the northern border is the 60th parallel. Alberta's western border runs along peaks of the Rocky Mountain ridge and then extends north to the 60th parallel. The District of Keewatin became an administrative unit of the Northwest Territories.

== 1906 ==
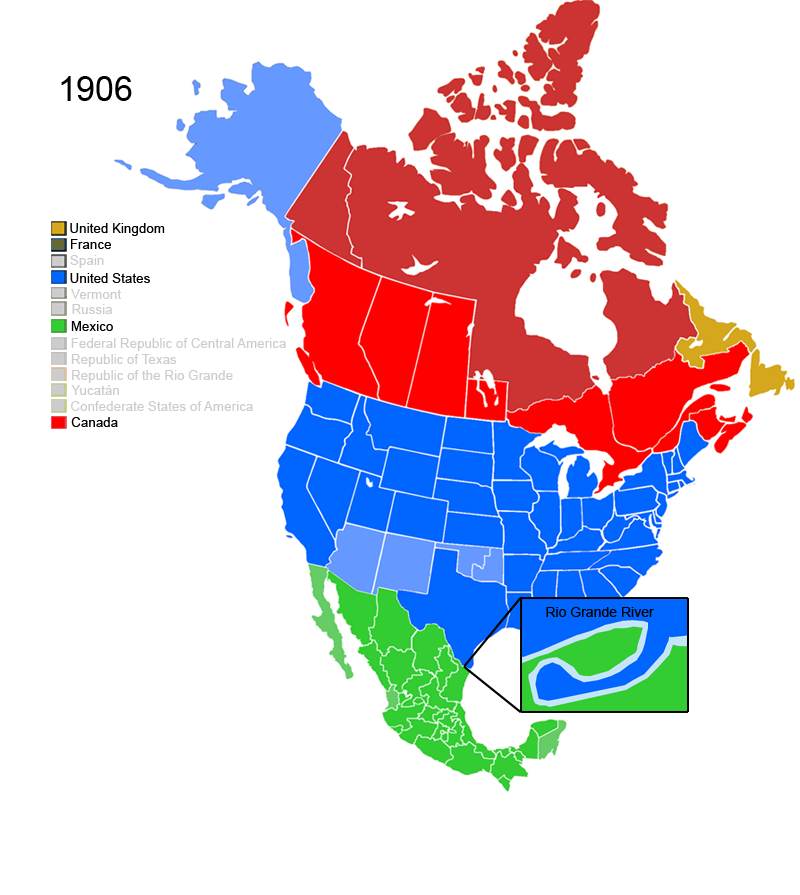

In 1906, the American Rio Grande Land and Irrigation Company performed an unauthorized diversion of the Rio Grande, which moved a 413-acre (167 ha) tract of land, including the American village of Rio Rico, south of the river. Since the 1845 Border Treaty all land south of the Rio Grande was Mexican. Mexican authorities unknowingly assumed control of the area, which became known as the Horcón Tract.

== 1907 ==
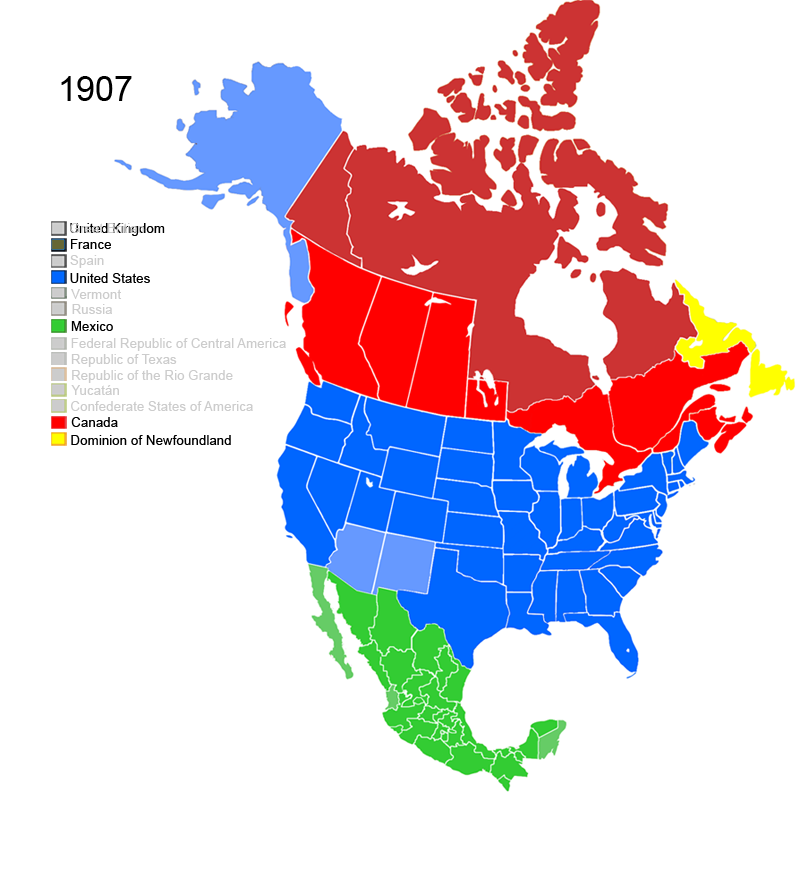

September 26, 1907

The Dominion of Newfoundland was a British dominion from 1907 (before which the territory had the status of a British colony, self-governing from 1855) to 1949. The Dominion of Newfoundland was situated in northeastern North America along the Atlantic coast and comprised the island of Newfoundland and Labrador on the mainland.

Newfoundland never became independent according to the modern meaning of the word. The Statute of Westminster 1931 would have made Newfoundland much closer to being independent, but not completely. However, the government of Newfoundland did not ratify it, and furthermore, abolished itself in 1934 because of bankruptcy.

November 16, 1907

Oklahoma Territory and Indian Territory were combined and admitted to the US as the 46th state, Oklahoma.

== 1912 ==
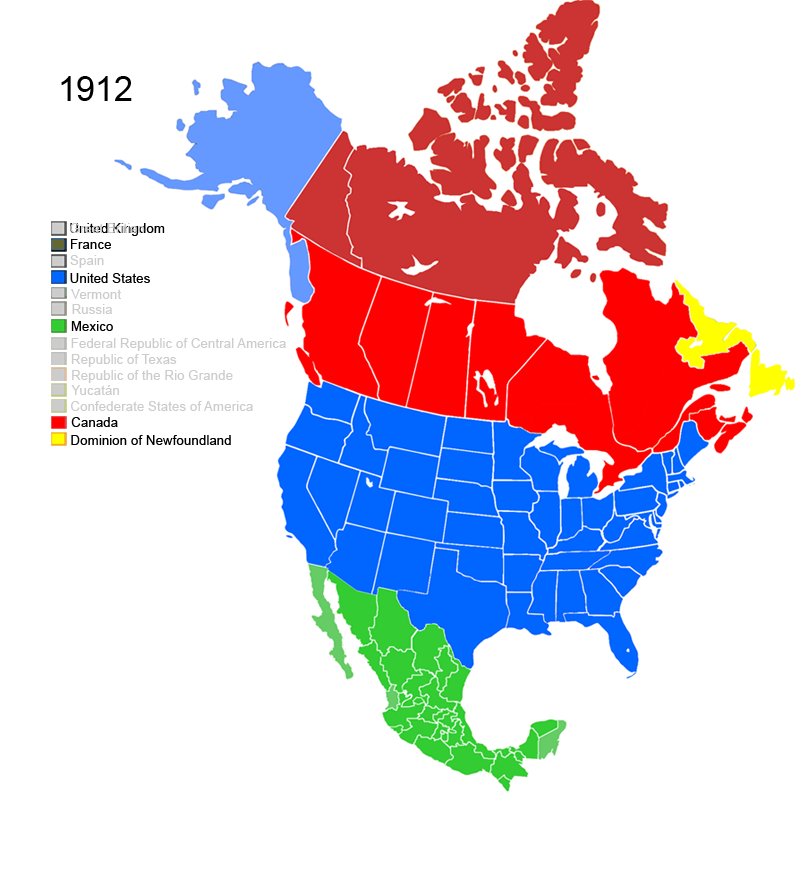

January 6, 1912

New Mexico Territory was admitted to the US as the 47th state, New Mexico.

February 14, 1912

Arizona Territory was admitted to the US as the 48th state, Arizona.

May 15, 1912

Manitoba, Ontario, and Quebec were all expanded into their present-day boundaries. The Northwest Territories is now only situated north of the 60th parallel (except Hudson Bay and James Bay islands) with three districts, Keewatin, Mackenzie and Franklin.

== February 5, 1917 ==
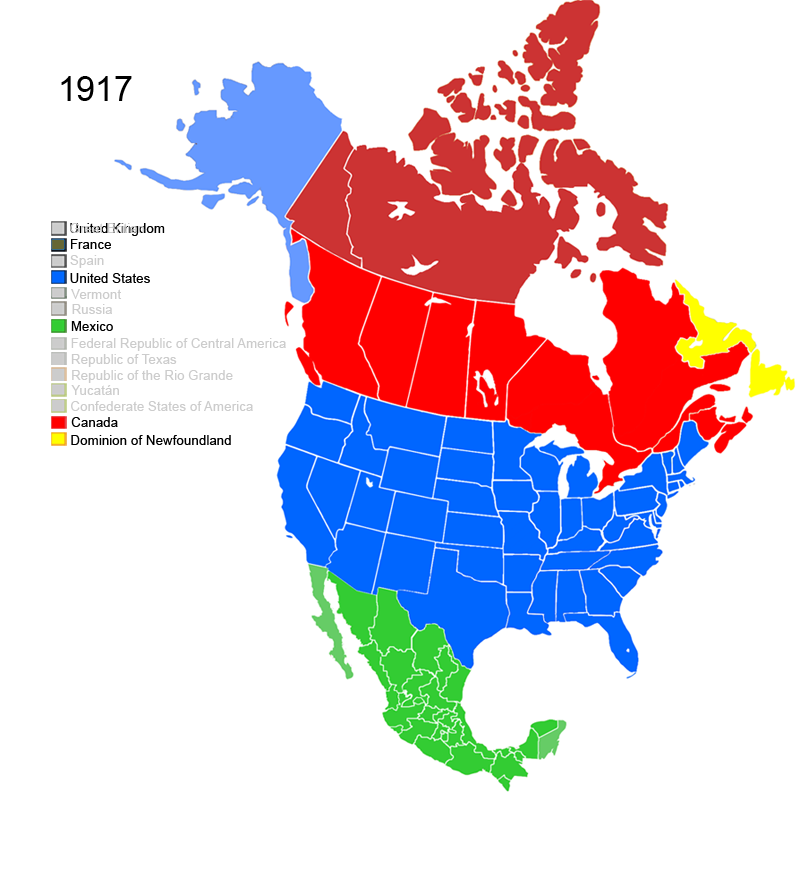

With the promulgation of the 1917 Constitution of Mexico, the territory of Tepic had its name and status changed to the state of Nayarit.

== March 28, 1921 ==
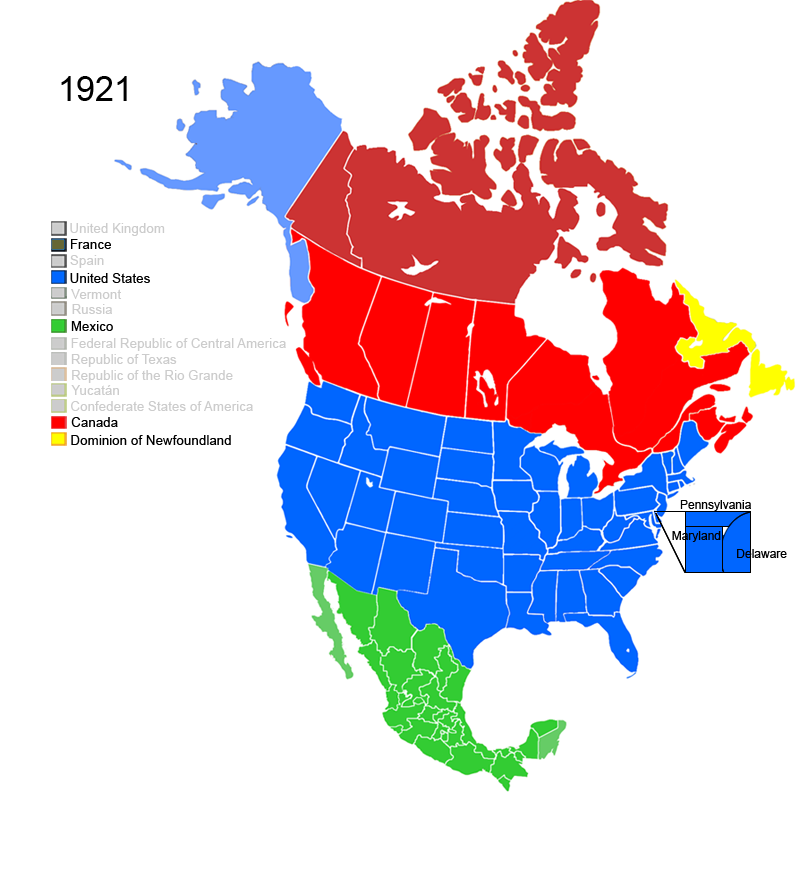

The dispute over a square mile between Delaware and Pennsylvania, The Wedge, is finally resolved in favor of Delaware.

== March 11, 1927 ==
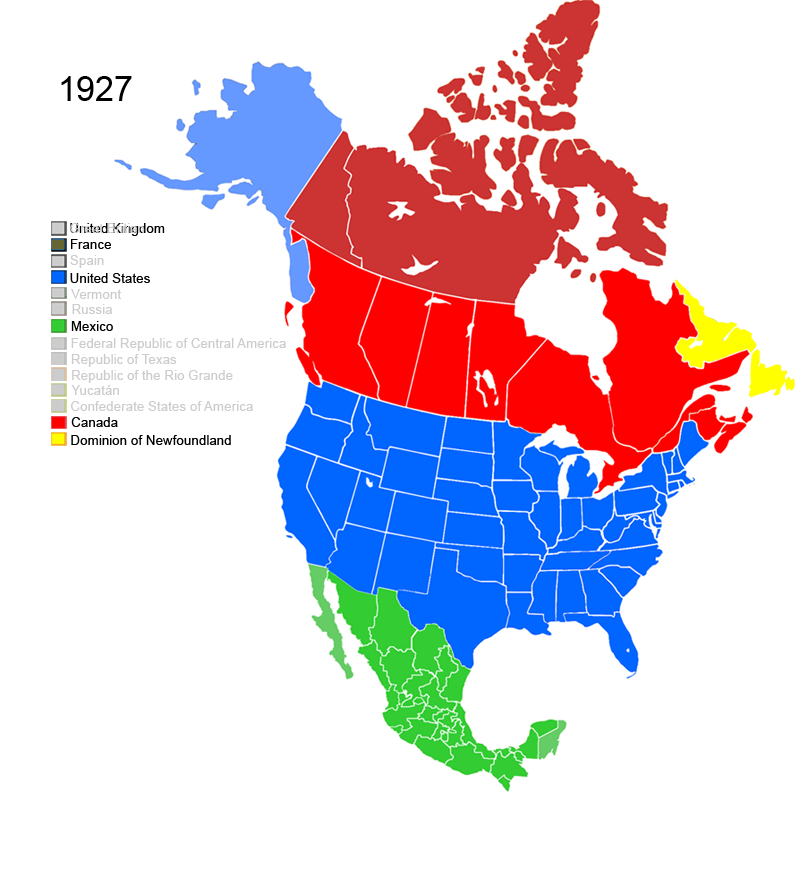

A decision of the Judicial Committee of the British Privy Council of 1927 decided the issue of the border between the Dominion of Newfoundland and Canada in favour of Newfoundland. The issue had been the precise boundary between the Canadian province of Quebec and Labrador, part of Newfoundland. The boundary ruling clarified that a large area of the disputed land belonged to Newfoundland, not to Canada.

Maps prior to 1927 wildly disagreed on the actual position of the border, instead of agreeing upon marking the area as being disputed. Maps after 1927 tended to agree with the decision, but due to protests, some mapmakers in Quebec still disagreed. In the 1960s, logos of the two biggest political parties of Quebec (PLQ & UN) both included the shape of the province as including all of Labrador. Disagreements persist even today (to a lesser extent), as Quebec insists on including the rest of the gulf's basin in its maps, separated with a dotted line saying 1927 border, non-final. Newfoundland complains in 2014, even though older electoral maps showed the same.

== 1928 ==
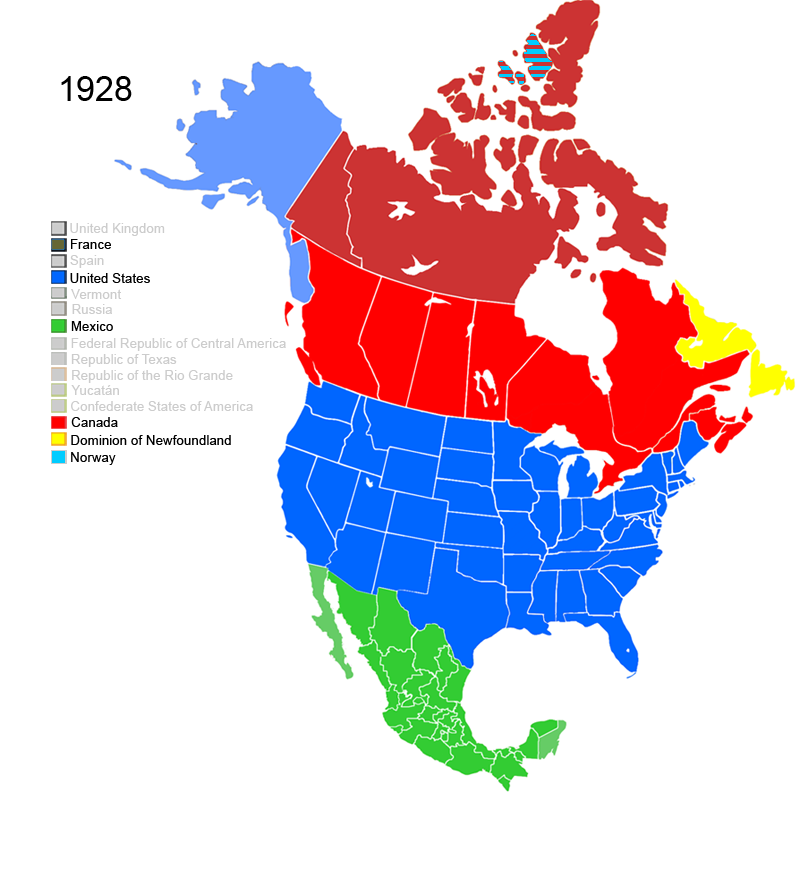

Norway asserted its claim of sovereignty over the Sverdrup Islands. The islands are named after Norwegian explorer Otto Sverdrup, who explored and mapped them from 1898 to 1902 with the vessel Fram, although some were previously inhabited by Inuit. Sverdrup claimed the islands for Norway, but the Norwegian government showed no interest in pursuing the claim until 1928. At that point, the Norwegian government raised the claim, primarily to use the islands as bargaining chips in negotiations with the United Kingdom over the status of the Arctic island Jan Mayen and the Antarctic Bouvet Island.

== November 11, 1930 ==
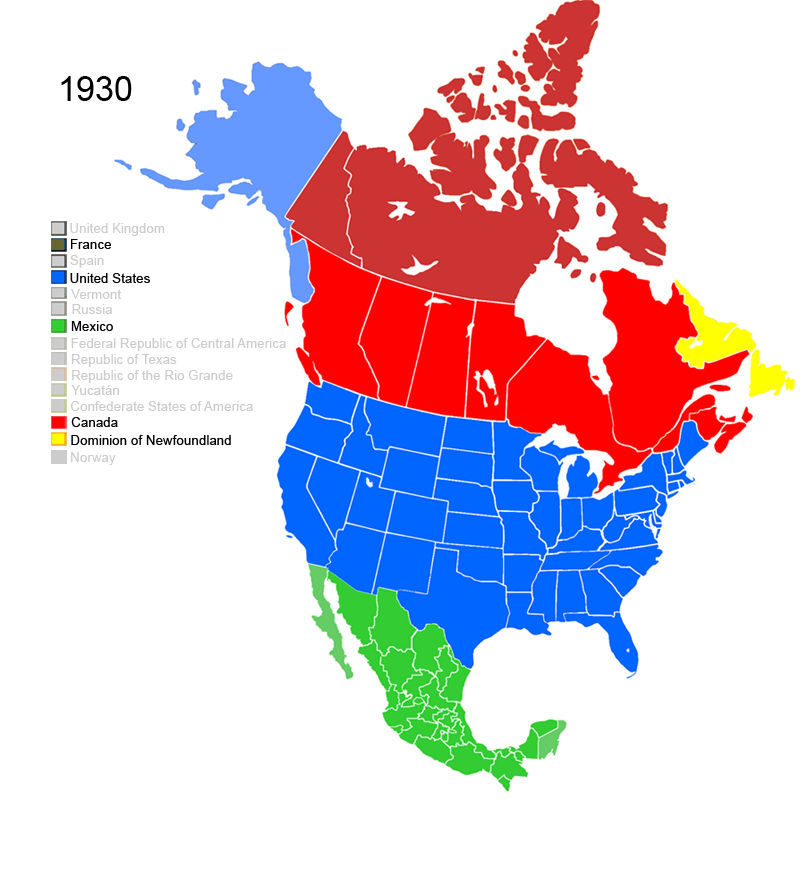

Sverdrup Islands are ceded to Canada by Norway, in exchange for British recognition of Norway's sovereignty over Jan Mayen.

== February 7, 1931 ==
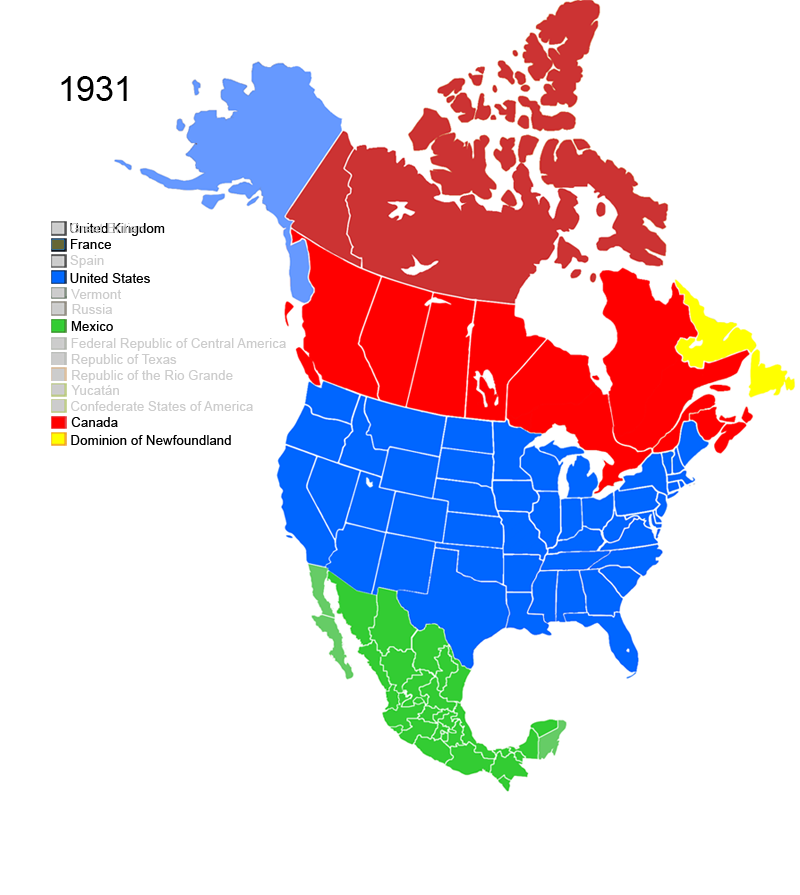

The Mexican Baja California Territory was split into North Territory of Baja California and South Territory of Baja California.

== December 11, 1931 ==
Statute of Westminster 1931 allows dominions to become independent. Dominion of Canada decides to become almost independent, whereas Newfoundland does not sign (see 1934).

== 1934 ==
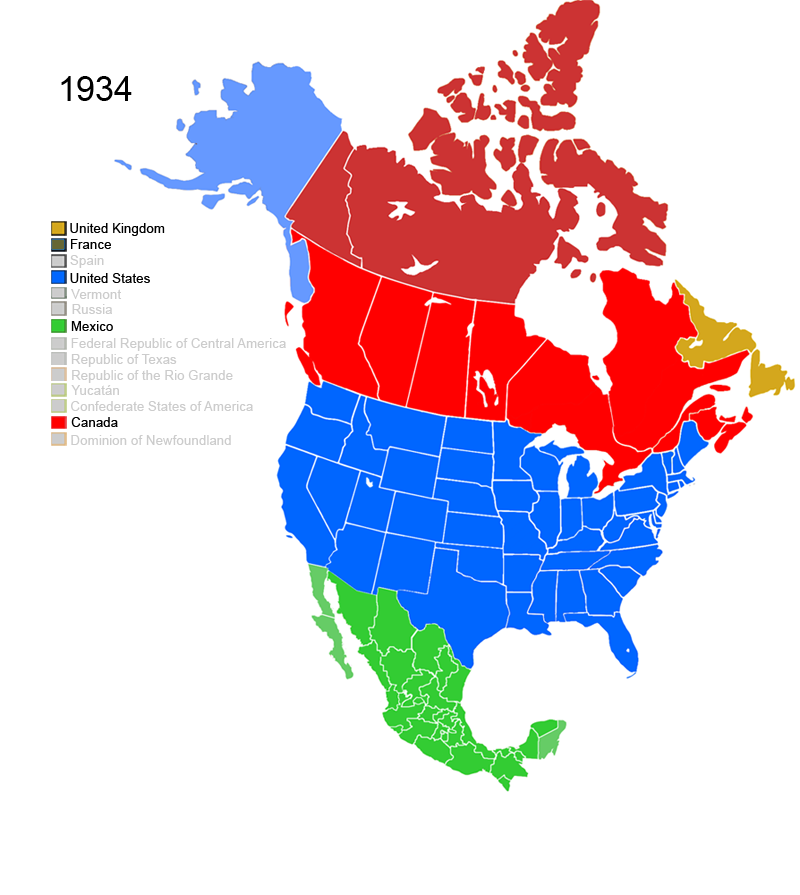

The Dominion of Newfoundland, because of financial difficulties, was obliged to give up its self-governing status and the Commission of Government took its place.

== 1948 ==
Air Force Island, Prince Charles Island, and Foley Island are discovered and added to Northwest Territories.

== March 31, 1949 ==
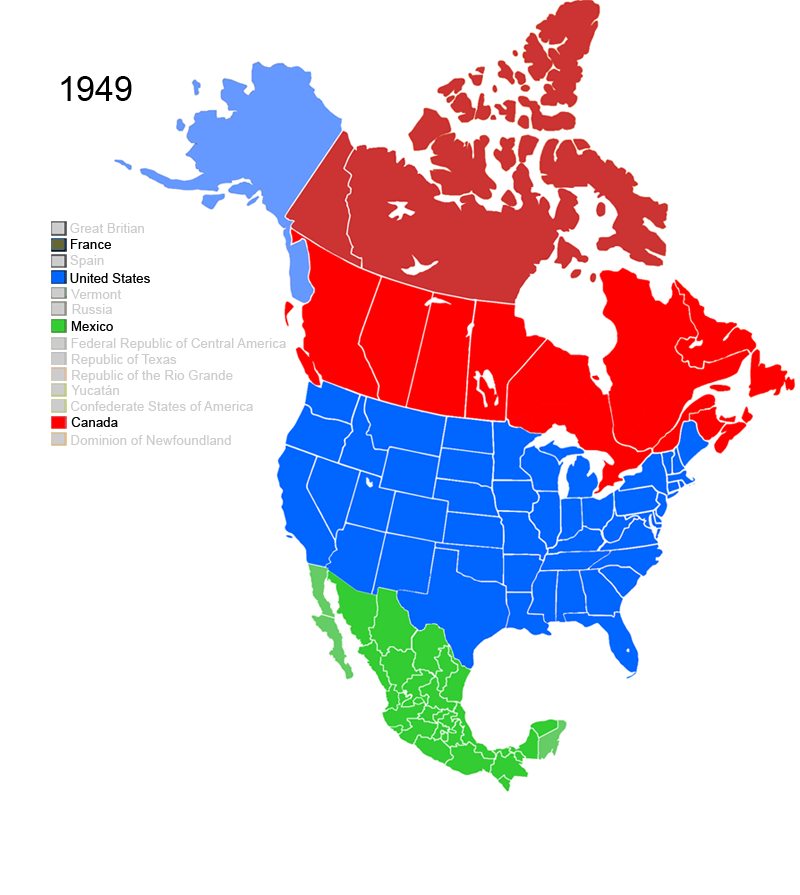

The Dominion of Newfoundland and its dependency of Labrador joined Canada as the tenth province, named Newfoundland as proclaimed by the British North America Act 1949.

== November 21, 1952 ==
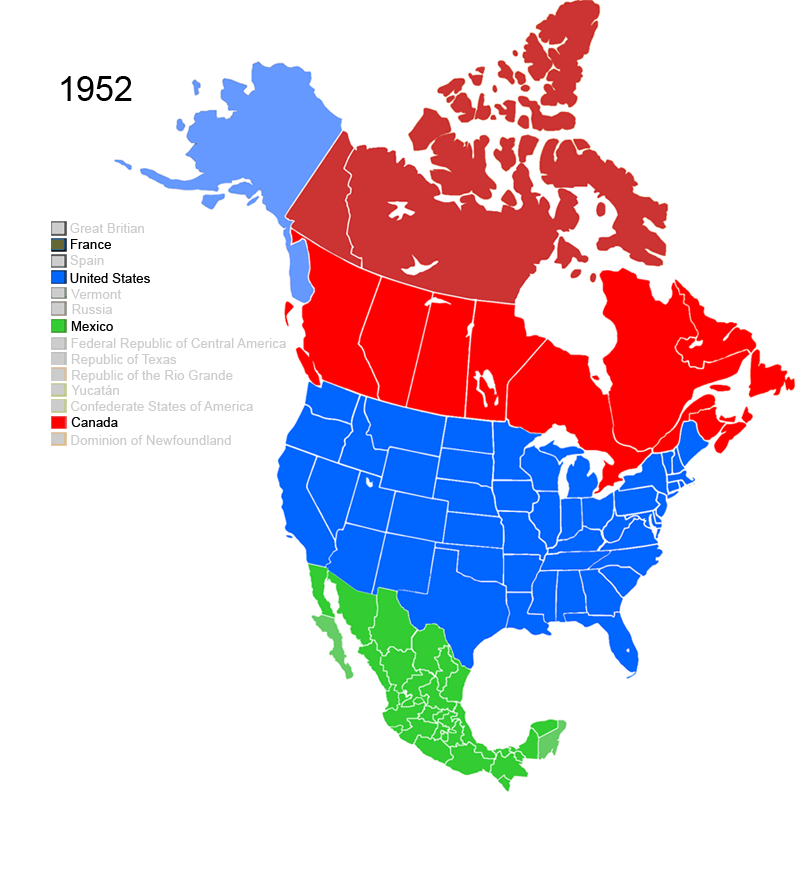

The North Territory of Baja California changed its status and became the state of Baja California.

== 1959 ==
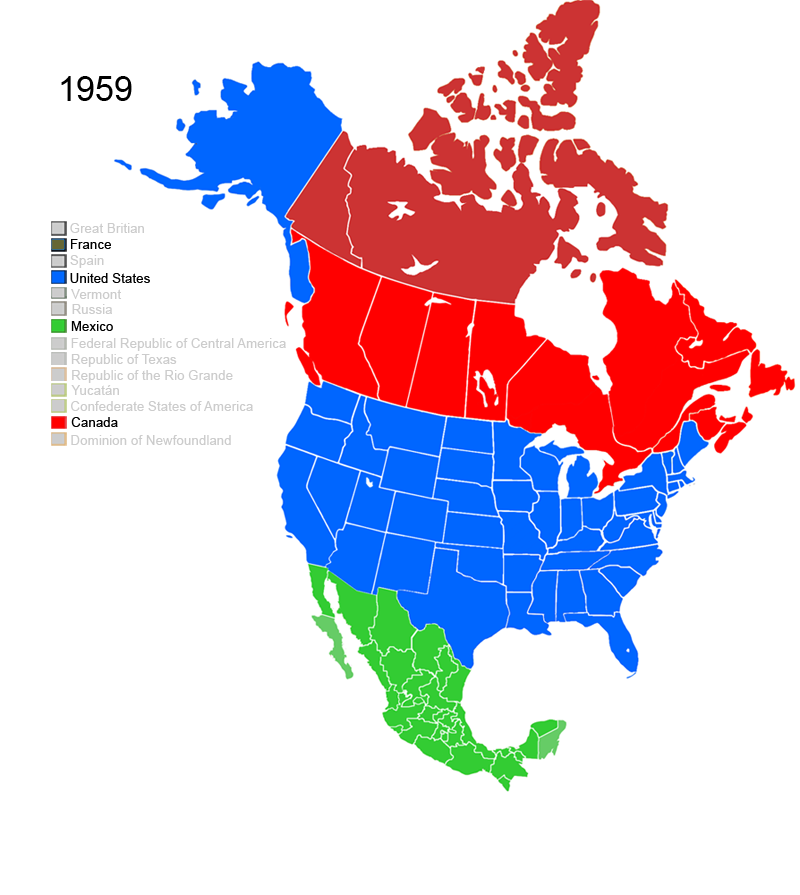

January 3, 1958

Alaska Territory was admitted to the US as the 49th state, Alaska.

== 1970 ==
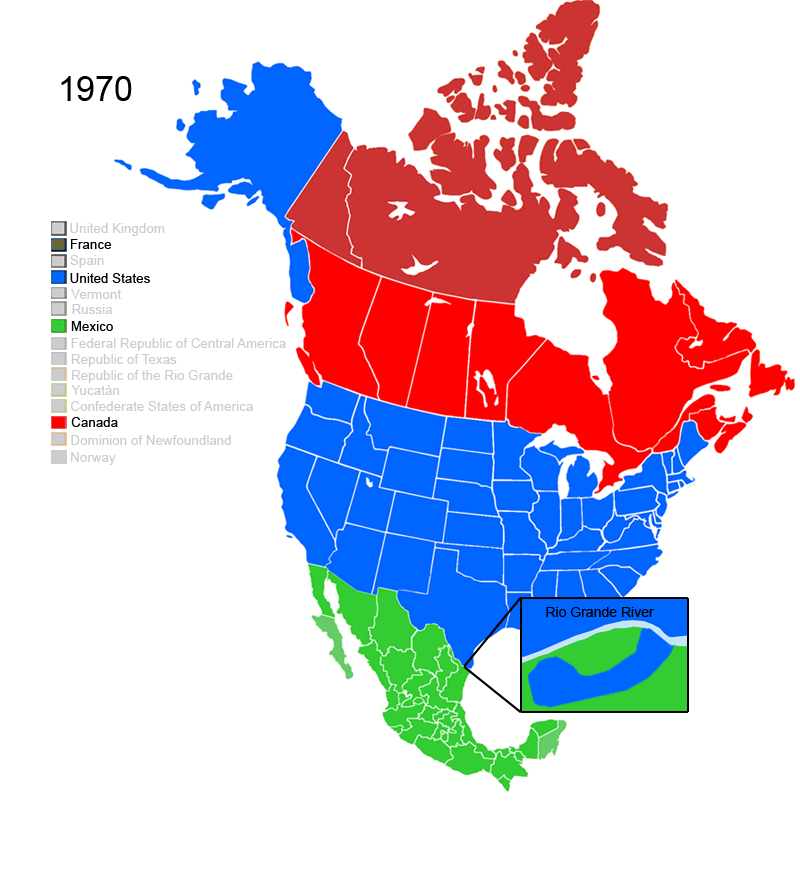

The city of Rio Rico, Texas, was ceded to Mexico in the Boundary Treaty of 1970. The handover officially took place in 1977 and the city was added to the Mexican state of Tamaulipas.

== October 8, 1974 ==
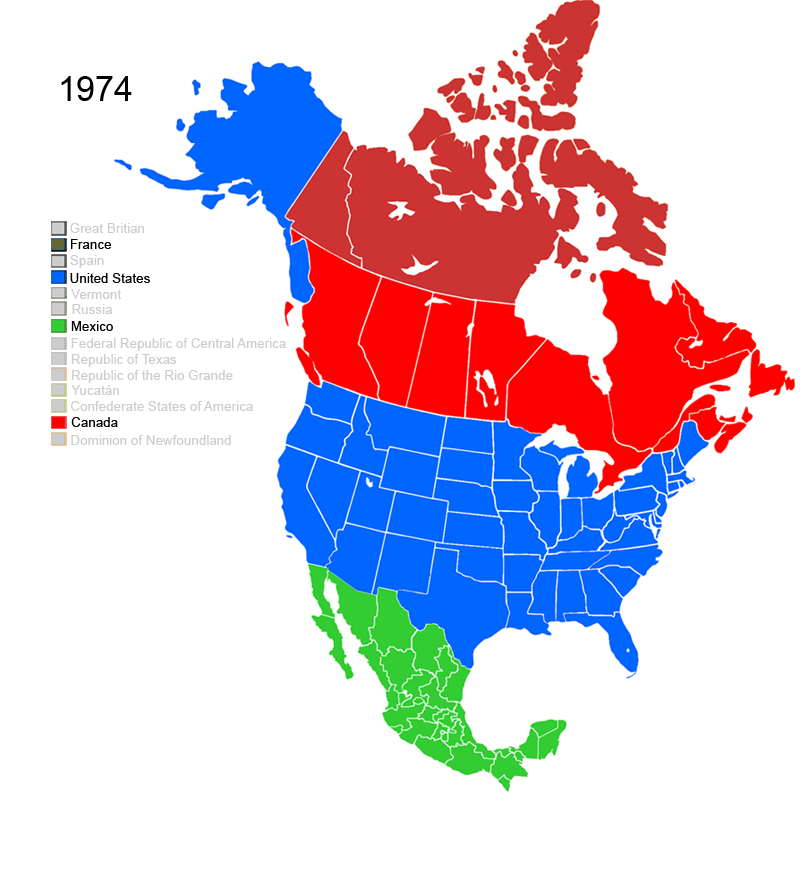

The territory of Quintana Roo changed into a state status. The South Territory of Baja California changed its status and became the state of Baja California Sur, giving Mexico its present-day configuration.

== April 1, 1999 ==
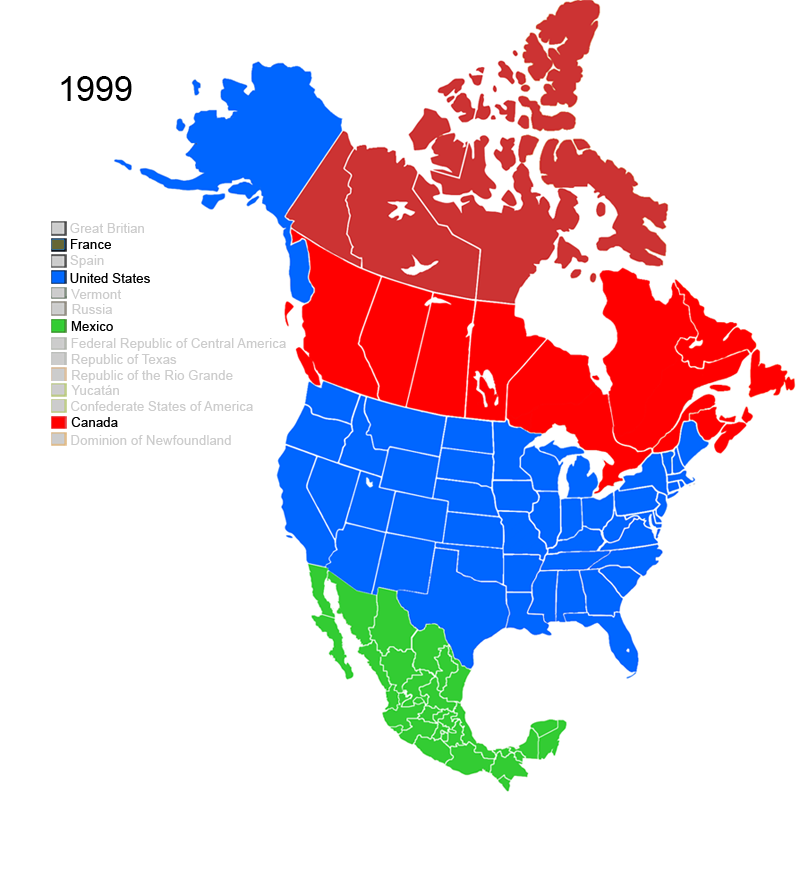

The Canadian territory of Nunavut was created from the Northwest Territories. The provisional districts are no longer administrative areas of the Northwest Territories.

== Bibliography ==
=== Citations ===
- Bacci, Massimo Livi (2001). A concise history of world population (2001 ed.). Wiley-Blackwell. ISBN 0-631-22335-5. - Total pages: 251
- Barman, Jean (1996). The West beyond the West: a history of British Columbia (1996 ed.). University of Toronto Press. ISBN 0-8020-7185-6. - Total pages: 449
- Berton, Pierre (1988). The Arctic grail: the quest for the North West Passage and the North Pole, 1818–1909 (1988 ed.). Viking. ISBN 0-670-82491-7. - Total pages: 672
- Bemis, Samuel Flagg (2008). The Diplomacy of the American Revolution (2008 ed.). Read Books. ISBN 978-1-4437-2193-6. - Total pages: 320
- Bourne, Charles B. (1977). Canadian Yearbook of International Law, Volume 14 (1977 ed.). UBC Press. ISBN 0-7748-0069-0. - Total pages: 442
- Canada, Government of (1893). Sessional papers, Volume 46, Issue 24: Report of the Dominion Fishery Commission on the Fisheries of the Province of Ontario (1893 ed.). C. H. Parmelee.
- Cannon, Kerry A. (1995). On the Land: Confronting the Challenges to Aboriginal Self-Determination (1995 ed.). Dundurn Press Ltd. ISBN 0-9690783-6-6. - Total pages: 165
- Chamier, Frederick; James, William. The naval history of Great Britain: from the declaration of war by France in 1793, to the accession of George IV., Volumes 3-4 (1837 ed.). London:R. Bentley. - Total pages: 377
- Chamier, Frederick; James, William. The naval history of Great Britain, from the declaration of war by France in 1793, to the accession of George IV (1860 ed.). London:W. Clowes and sons. - Total pages: 461
- Chiorazzi, Michael G.; Most, Marguerite. Prestatehood legal materials (2005 ed.). Routledge. ISBN 0-7890-2056-4.
- Dauenhauer, Richard; Black, Lydia (2008). Russians in Tlingit America (2008 ed.). University of Washington Press. ISBN 978-0-295-98601-2. - Total pages: 491
- Davis, William C. (2005). The pirates Laffite: the treacherous world of the corsairs of the Gulf (2005 ed.). Houghton Mifflin Harcourt. ISBN 0-15-100403-X. - Total pages: 706
- Fink, Paul M. (1989). Jonesborough: the first century of Tennessee's first town, 1776–1876 (1989 ed.). The Overmountain Press. ISBN 0-932807-38-0. - Total pages: 203
- Hansen, Jerry (2007). State Boundaries Of America: How, Why, and When American State Lines Were Formed (2007 ed.). Heritage Books. ISBN 978-0-7884-4456-2. - Total pages: 210
- Haycox, Stephen W. (2002). Alaska: an American colony (2002 ed.). C. Hurst & Co. Publishers. ISBN 1-85065-677-0. - Total pages: 372
- international (1914). The New international year book (1914 ed.). Dodd, Mead and Co.
- Kalani, Lyn; Sweedler, Sarah (2004). Fort Ross and the Sonoma Coast (2004 ed.). Arcadia Publishing. ISBN 0-7385-2896-X. - Total pages: 128
- Knafla, Louis A.; Swainger, Jonathan Scott (2005). Laws and societies in the Canadian prairie west, 1670–1940 (2005 ed.). University of British Columbia Press. ISBN 0-7748-1166-8. - Total pages: 344
- Who Named the North-Land? (August 19, 1876 ed.). Manitoba Free Press.
- Keewatin (August 19, 1876 ed.). Manitoba Free Press.
- Marley, David F. (2005). Historic cities of the Americas: an illustrated encyclopedia (2005 ed.). ABC-CLIO. ISBN 1-57607-027-1. - Total pages: 1010
- Martin, Frederick; Keltie, Sir John Scott; Renwick, Isaac Parker Anderson; Epstein, Mortimer; Steinberg, Sigfrid Henry; Paxton, John. The Statesman's year-book (1899 ed.). St. Martin's Press.
- Miller, Tom (1981). On the border: portraits of America's southwestern frontier (1981 ed.). Harper & Row. ISBN 0-06-013039-3. - Total pages: 226
- Mills, David (1877). Report on the Boundaries of the Province of Ontario (1877 ed.). Hunter, Rose & Co. - Total pages: 204
- Mireles, Jovita González; Cotera, María Eugenia (2006). Life along the border: a landmark Tejana thesis (2006 ed.). Texas A&M University Press. ISBN 1-58544-564-9. - Total pages: 131
- Parliament, Great Britain (1841). Correspondence relative to the affairs of Canada, 1841 (1841 ed.). Printed by W. Clowes for Her Majesty's Stationery Office. - Total pages: 72
- Van DeWater, Frederic F. (1974). The Reluctant Republic, Vermont 1724–1791 (1974 ed.). The John Day company. ISBN 0-914378-02-3. - Total pages: 344
