= List of islands of Canada =

This is an incomplete list of islands of Canada.

== Arctic islands ==
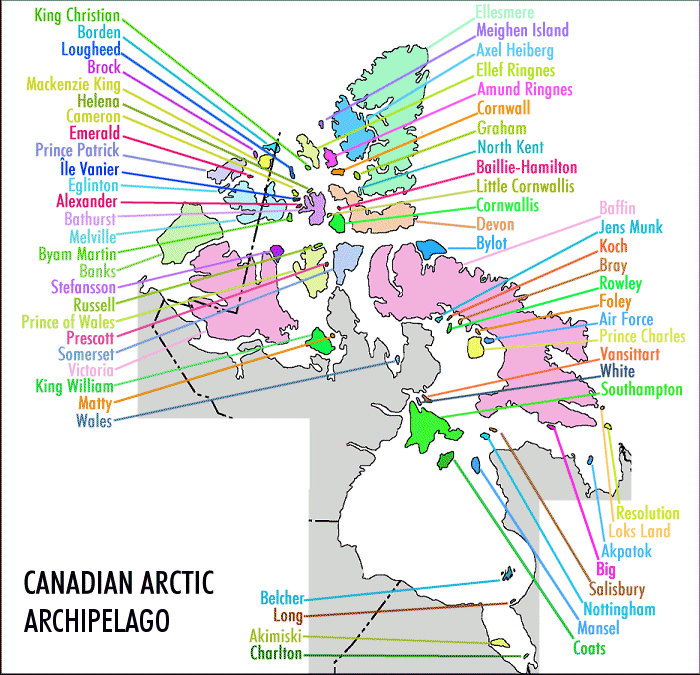
Map of Canadian islands in the Arctic Ocean

Islands and island groups in the Arctic Archipelago include (all islands in Nunavut unless noted):

=== Queen Elizabeth Islands ===
The Queen Elizabeth Islands consist of:

- Adams Island
- Alexander Island
- Baillie-Hamilton Island
- Borden Island (Note: Divided between the Northwest Territories and Nunavut)
- Brock Island (Note: Located in the Northwest Territories)
- Buckingham Island
- Byam Martin Island
- Cameron Island
- Coburg Island
- Cornwall Island
- Devon Island
- Eglinton Island
- Ellesmere Island (Note: Inhabited)
- Emerald Isle
- Graham Island
- Griffith Island
- Helena Island
- Hoved Island
- Île Vanier
- King Christian Island
- Little Cornwallis Island
- Lougheed Island
- Mackenzie King Island
- Massey Island
- Meighen Island
- North Kent Island
- Pioneer Island
- Prince Patrick Island
- Stor Island
- 2,092 other minor islands including Hans Island (with Denmark) (Inuktitut: Tartupaluk), a small uninhabited barren knoll off Ellesmere Island, measuring 1.3 km^{2} (0.50 sq mi)

==== Sverdrup Islands ====
The Sverdrup Islands, an archipelago of the northern Queen Elizabeth Islands, include:

- Amund Ringnes Island
- Axel Heiberg Island
- Ellef Ringnes Island
- Haig-Thomas Island

==== Parry Islands ====
The Parry Islands, an archipelago of the northern Queen Elizabeth Islands, include:

- Bathurst Island
- Cornwallis Island
- Melville Island
- Berkeley Islands (a subgroup of the Parry Islands)

=== Belcher Islands ===
The Belcher Islands consist of:

- Flaherty Island
- Innetalling Island
- Kugong Island
- Mavor Island
- Moore Island
- Snape Island
- Split Island
- Tukarak Island
- Wiegand Island

=== Other Arctic islands ===
- Adams Island
- Air Force Island
- Akimiski Island
- Akpatok Island
- Angijak Island
- Baffin Island
- Banks Island
- Bray Island
- Brevoort Island
- Broughton Island
- Bylot Island
- Charles Island
- Charlton Island
- Coats Island
- Crown Prince Frederik Island
- Dexterity Island
- Dorset Island
- Edgell Island
- Foley Island
- Herschel Island (Inuvialuktun: Qikiqtaruk)
- Igloolik Island
- Kapuiviit (formerly Jens Munk Island)
- Killiniq Island
- King William Island
- Koch Island
- Loks Land
- Long Island (Frobisher Bay)
- Long Island (Hudson Bay)
- Mansel Island
- Matty Island
- Mill Island
- Moodie Island
- Nagjuttuuq (formerly Vansittart Island)
- North Twin Island
- Nottingham Island
- O'Reilly Island
- Paallavvik (formerly Padloping Island)
- Pandora Island
- Prescott Island
- Prince Charles Island
- Prince of Wales Island
- Qikiqtaaluk (formerly Sillem Island)
- Qikiqtaaluk (Foxe Basin) (formerly White Island)
- Qikiqtagafaaluk (formerly Admiralty Island)
- Qikiqtarjuaq (formerly Big Island)
- Qikiqtaryuaq (formerly Jenny Lind Island)
- Qikiqtaryuaq (Queen Maud Gulf) (formerly Melbourne Island)
- Resolution Island
- Richards Island
- Rowley Island
- Russell Island
- Salisbury Island
- Smith Island (Frobisher Bay)
- Smith Island (Hudson Bay)
- Somerset Island
- Southampton Island
- South Tweedsmuir Island
- Stefansson Island
- Tennent Islands
- Umingmalik (formerly Gateshead Island)
- Victoria Island
- Wales Island (Nunavut)
- Wales Island (Ungava)
- 34,377 other minor islands

== Newfoundland and Labrador ==
- Baccalieu Island
- Bell Island
- Bell Island (Grey Islands)
- Belle Isle
- Brunette Island
- Carbonear Island
- Change Islands
- Cod Island
- Fogo Island
- Funk Island
- Great Colinet Island
- Grey Islands
- Groais Island
- Horse Islands
- Ireland's Eye Island
- Kelly's Island
- Kikkertavak Island
- Killiniq Island
- Long Island (Hermitage Bay)
- Long Island (Placentia Bay)
- Merasheen Island
- Newfoundland
- New World Island
- Paul's Island
- Puffin Island
- Quirpon Island
- Ramea Islands
- Random Island
- Red Island
- South Aulatsivik Island
- Tunungayualok Island

== Nova Scotia ==
- Barren Island
- Big Tancook Island
- Boularderie Island
- Brier Island
- Cape Breton Island
- Cape Sable Island
- Deadmans Island
- Devils Island
- Dover Island
- Flint Island
- Georges Island
- Henry Island
- Ingonish Island
- Lawlor Island
- Long Island
- Île Madame
- McNabs Island
- Oak Island
- Partridge Island
- Petit de Grat Island
- Pictou Island
- Port Hood Island
- Sable Island
- Lot No 44, Briar Lake
- Scatarie Island
- Seal Island
- Sherose Island
- Sober Island
- Southwest Island
- Stoddart Island
- Saint Paul Island
- Tusket Islands
- Hirtle Island

== Prince Edward Island ==
- Boughton Island
- Governors Island
- Hog Island Sand Hills
- Holman Island
- Lennox Island
- Murray Islands
- Panmure Island
- St. Peters Island

== Quebec ==
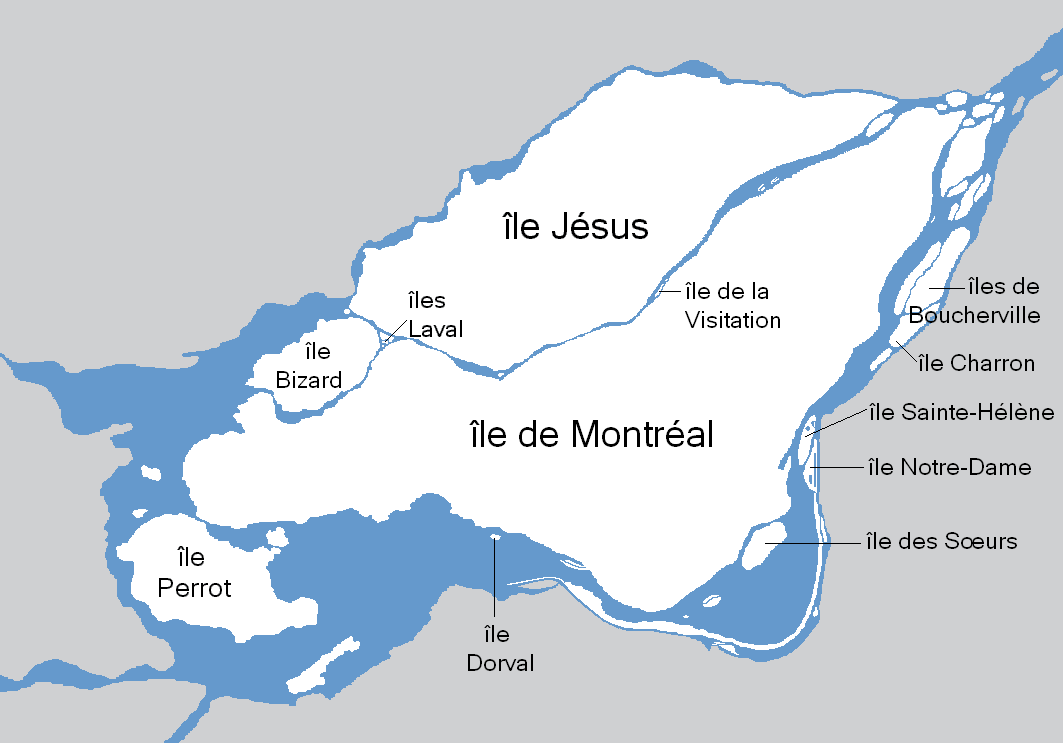
Map of the Hochelaga Archipelago

- Anticosti Island
- Entry Island
- Île Bonaventure
- Île Bizard
- Îles de Boucherville
- Île de la Visitation
- Île-des-Sœurs
- Île d'Orléans
- Île Dorval
- Île Jésus
- Île Notre-Dame
- Île Perrot
- Île René-Levasseur
- Île Sainte-Hélène
- Îles Laval
- Island of Montreal
- Magdalen Islands
- Île aux Oeufs

== Ontario ==
- Amherst Island
- Manitoulin Island
- Thousand Islands
- Toronto Islands
- Wolfe Island

== Manitoba ==
- Black Island
- Elk Island
- George Island
- Hecla Island
- Matheson Island
- Reindeer Island
- Sandy Islands
- Spider Islands

== Saskatchewan ==
- Auriat Island
- Beaver Island
- Cumberland Island
- Finlayson Island
- Fleming Island
- Hofer Island
- Ispatinow Island
- King Island
- Lenz Island
- McLean Island
- Sandy Island
- Johns Island
- Tate Island
- Todd Island
- Turner Island
- Umisk Island
- Wilson Island
- Yorath Island

== Alberta ==
- Big Island
- Bustard Island
- Burntwood Island
- Castle Island
- Daphne Island
- Dog Island
- Prince's Island
- Spirit Island

== British Columbia ==
British Columbia has a number of groups of islands falling within the following geographic areas:

- South Coast, including:
  - Vancouver Island
  - Gulf of Georgia region (Southern Gulf Islands, Northern Gulf Islands, Discovery Islands, Sunshine Coast, Howe Sound)
  - West Coast of Vancouver Island Broken Islands Group, Cape Scott, Nootka Sound, Kyuquot Sound, Clayoquot Sound
  - Lower Mainland, primarily consisting of river or lake islands in Burrard Inlet, Harrison Lake, and the Fraser River.
- Central Coast, including:
  - Johnstone Strait-Queen Charlotte Strait region (Broughton Archipelago)
  - Fitz Hugh Sound-Dean Channel region
- North Coast, including:
  - Queen Charlotte Sound-Hecate Strait region
  - Dixon Entrance-Portland Channel region
  - Haida Gwaii (Queen Charlotte Islands)
- Interior, including islands in:
  - Lake Okanagan
  - The Fraser Canyon (Fraser River)
  - The Kootenay and Columbia Rivers

== Additional notes ==
Canada has at times made motions historically to annex Turks and Caicos, see Proposed Canadian annexation of the Turks and Caicos Islands. However, it became autonomous territory of the United Kingdom.

== See also ==
- Lists of islands
- List of Canadian islands by area
- List of Canadian islands by population
- Exclusive economic zone of Canada
