= Yorath =

Yorath is an anglicised form of the Welsh name Iorwerth. Notable people with the surname include:

- Christopher J. Yorath (1879–1932), commissioner of Saskatoon and city treasurer during World War I
- Terry Yorath (1950–2026), Welsh football player and manager
- Gabby Logan (née Yorath), British television and radio sports presenter

== See also ==
- Yorath Island, a small island in the South Saskatchewan River just outside the southern boundaries of the city of Saskatoon, Saskatchewan, Canada
