= River Landing Towers =

- High-rise Complex
- {{{other_names}}}
- Former names: River Landing Village; Parcel Y
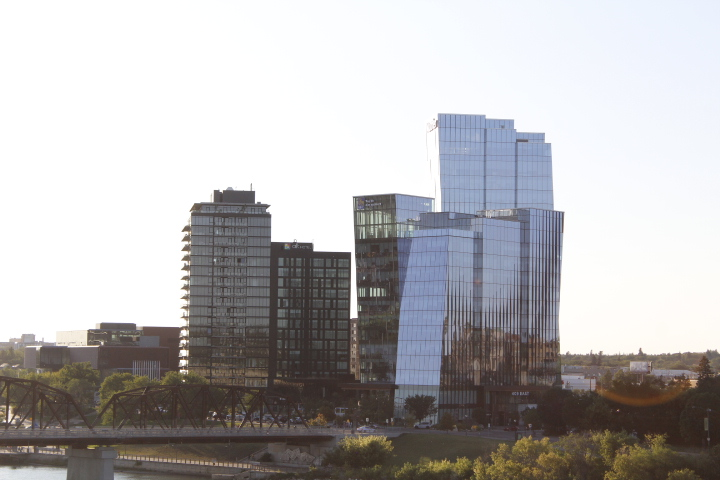
- Opened: 2021
- Owner: Victory Majors Investments Corp.
- Location: River Landing, Saskatoon, Saskatchewan, Canada
- Address: 19th St E, 2nd Ave S, Spadina Cres, 3rd Ave S
- Coordinates: 52°07′23″N 106°39′54″W

River Landing Towers, previously known as River Landing Village, is a mixed-use development in Saskatoon, Saskatchewan, Canada consisting of three highrises. Located on the southern tip of downtown Saskatoon between the Traffic and Idylwyld bridges, the site has long been the most expensive and most sought for pieces of real estate in Saskatoon. Victory Majors Investments Corporation has been overseeing the project. This development has gone through significant changes and gone through 2 different developers over a span of 10 years.

== Site Tender ==
The site (called parcel Y) is part of River Landing Phase 1, an initiative by the City of Saskatoon to redevelop the south downtown region along the South Saskatchewan River.

The tender process for the site was complex, and underwent the following delay:

- March 2007 - Remai Ventures pulls out of plan to build a destination hotel and spa on the site
- June 2007 - Lake Placid Investments led by CEO Michael E Lobsinger expresses an interest in submits bid for the River Landing Village complex
- September 2007 - The Lake Placid bid is the only one submitted for the $4.8 Million Canadian parcel
- January 2008 - The Sale if approved by the city
- September 2008 - Plans are approved by the city and the Meewasin Valley Authority
- January 2009 - Lake Placid misses the payment deadline on the parcel, an extension is given
- August 2009 - Lake Placid misses the payment deadline on the parcel, an extension is given
- October 31, 2009 - Lake Placid misses the payment deadline on the parcel and forfeits the deposit
- November 2009 - Lake Placid asks for an extension,
- March 2010 - Lake Placid and Victory Majors Investments led by Karim Nasser, approach the city to try and resurrect the project with Marriott Hotels attending the presentation to council
- April 2010 - City reappraises the land at $11 million
- June 2010 - The city enters into an agreement to sell the property for $5.2 Million
- November 2010 - Victory Majors Investments buys out Lake Placid's interest in the project
- August 2011 - Victory Majors proposes a major overhaul to original design to include a 27-story residential tower, a 17-story office tower, and a 10-story hotel tower.
- January 2016 - A partnership with Group Germain Hotels is announced.
- June 29, 2016 - A groundbreaking ceremony is held for the first phase of the project, which includes a 125-unit condominium tower and a 155-room Alt Hotel.
- May 2017 - The conglomerate announces the first of two office towers is moving ahead.
- May 2019 - A ceremony is held to mark the completion of the top floor of the first and smaller of two office towers. Work has also started on the second tower, called Nutrien Tower, which is expected to be Saskatchewan’s tallest building once completed.
- December 2019 - The consortium confirms Nutrien Tower will become the province’s tallest once complete.
- August 3, 2021 - A ceremony is held to mark the opening of K.W. Nasser Plaza, a few days after city hall granted formal occupancy of Nutrien Tower.

== Specifications ==
The complex consists of:

- No. 1 River Landing, a 20 story mixed-use residential tower completed in 2019.
- Alt Hotel, a 14 story hotel tower, including two restaurants, and banquet/multi-purpose space, completed in 2019.
- River Landing East Tower (RBC Tower), a 13 story office tower, completed in 2019.
- Nutrien Tower, a 18 story office tower, completed in 2021 and the tallest building in Saskatchewan.
- shared partially underground parkade with 620 stalls.
- 5,000 square feet (460 m^{2}) of retail split between the various buildings in the complex.
- K.W. Nasser Plaza, a common plaza with trees and water feature.

== See also ==
- List of tallest buildings in Saskatoon
