= Barren =

Barren primarily refers to a state of barrenness (infertility)

Barren may also refer to:

== Places ==
- Barren, Missouri
- Barren County, Kentucky
- Barren Island (Andaman Islands)
- Barren Island, Brooklyn
- Barren River Lake

== Other uses ==
- Barren County (album)
- Barren County Progress (newspaper)
- Barren Realms Elite (game)
- Barren strawberry, various meanings
- Barren vegetation
- Cape Barren goose
- Urchin barren an urchin-dominated area with little or no kelp

== See also ==
- Baron
- Barren Ground (disambiguation)
- Barrens (disambiguation)
