= McLean Island =

McLean Island may refer to:

- McLean Island (Nunavut), an island in Nunavut, Canada
- McLean Island (Saskatchewan), a village in Saskatchewan, Canada
- McLeans Island, a rural area near Christchurch, New Zealand

== See also ==
- Maclean Island, an island in Tasmania
