= Barrens =

Barrens may refer to:

- Pine barrens, a type of ecosystem found in the Northeastern United States
  - Pine Barrens (New Jersey), a pine barren in the state of New Jersey
  - List of pine barrens which includes some other locations called "Pine Barrens" or "Barrens"
- Serpentine barrens, a grassland or savanna ecosystem in which toxic metals in the soil from minerals of the serpentine group inhibit the growth of many plants
- Urchin barrens, where the proliferation of sea urchins has caused a massive kelp die-off

The Barrens may refer to:

- the Tundra of northern Canada, sometimes specific to the Tundra of Northern Manitoba as referenced in the 1956 book Lost in the Barrens by Farley Mowat. Also called 'Barren Lands'.
- a location in the Warcraft Universe
- a novel by F. Paul Wilson
- a novel by Joyce Carol Oates
- The Barrens (It), a location in the novel It by Stephen King
- The Barrens (film), a 2012 American horror film written and directed by Darren Lynn Bousman and starring Stephen Moyer and Mia Kirshner
- an area in the video game OneShot

== See also ==
- Barren vegetation
- Barren (disambiguation)
- Barren Island (disambiguation)
