= Wilson Island (Saskatchewan) =

Island in Saskatchewan, Canada

- Interactive map of Wilson Island

Geography
- Location: Saskatchewan
- Coordinates: 52°02′07″N 106°42′47″W

Administration
- Canada

Wilson Island is a small island in the South Saskatchewan River south of the city of Saskatoon, Saskatchewan, Canada. This island is protected by the Meewasin Valley Authority. The island is not accessible but can be seen from a lookout point at Cranberry Flats.

Wilson Island (then known as Shepley Island) from 1943 to 1951 was home to a Royal Canadian Navy sea cadet camp under the command of Lieutenant P.K. Wilton. Sea cadets were transported to the island by a current-driven scow for two weeks of training that included swimming and rowing. In 1951 the island camp was abandoned due to spring flooding.

== See also ==
- List of islands of Saskatchewan
