= Turner Island =

Turner Island may refer to:

Antarctica

- Turner Island (Antarctica)

Canada

- Turner Island (Queens), in Nova Scotia
- Turner Island (Halifax), near Halifax Nova Scotia
- Turner Island (Nipissing), in the Nipissing region of Ontario
- Turner Island (Muskoka) in the Muskoka region of Ontario
- Turner Island (Manitoba) in Manitoba
- Turner Island (Saskatchewan), in Saskatchewan
- Turner Island (British Columbia) in British Columbia

Greenland

- Turner Island (Greenland)

United States

- Turner Island (United States), in Illinois
