= List of shipwrecks in June 1844 =

The list of shipwrecks in June 1844 includes ships sunk, foundered, wrecked, grounded, or otherwise lost during June 1844.

== 1 June ==
List of shipwrecks: 1 June 1844
Ship	State	Description
Bess	(United Kingdom of Great Britain and Ireland) British Honduras	The drogher, a schooner, capsized off Berbice.
Catis	United States	The ship was wrecked on the Fish Key, off the Abaco Islands. Her crew were rescued. She was on a voyage from Baltimore, Maryland to Havana, Cuba.

== 2 June ==
List of shipwrecks: 2 June 1844
Ship	State	Description
Caroline Ottilie	Prussia	The ship capsized off South Shields, County Durham with the loss of two of her crew. She was on a voyage from Dunkirk, Nord to South Shields. She was later towed in to South Shields and beached.
Iroquoise	United Kingdom	The ship was driven against the pier at Calais, France and was damaged. She was on a voyage from Calais to Cardiff, Glamorgan. She put back to Calais for repairs.

== 3 June ==
List of shipwrecks: 3 June 1844
Ship	State	Description
Charlotte	United Kingdom	The ship was wrecked on Cape Elcokie, Ottoman Empire. Her crew were rescued.
St. David	United Kingdom	The steamship ran aground at Belan Point, Caernarfonshire. She was on a voyage from Liverpool, Lancashire to Havre de Grâce, Seine-Inférieure, France. She was refloated and resumed her voyage.

== 4 June ==
List of shipwrecks: 4 June 1844
Ship	State	Description
Angelo	France	The ship ran aground at New Orleans, Louisiana, United States. She was on a voyage from New Orleans to Bordeaux, Gironde.

== 5 June ==
List of shipwrecks: 5 June 1844
Ship	State	Description
British Queen	United Kingdom	The ship ran aground on the Kerries, in Ballyteague Bay. She was on a voyage from Mobile, Alabama, United States to Liverpool, Lancashire. She was refloated the next day.
Jane	United Kingdom	The ship was driven ashore and wrecked at Delabole Point, Cornwall. Her crew were rescued.
Kitty Harvey	United Kingdom	The ship was driven ashore in Dundrum Bay. She was on a voyage from Liverpool to Quebec City, Province of Canada, British North America. She was refloated the net day and put in to Belfast, County Antrim.
Ocean	United Kingdom	The ship ran aground on the Barber Sand, in the North Sea off the coast of Norfolk. She was on a voyage from Fowey, Cornwall to South Shields, County Durham. She was refloated and resumed her voyage.

== 6 June ==
List of shipwrecks: 6 June 1844
Ship	State	Description
Dominica	United Kingdom	The barque was wrecked on the Folies Reef, 20 nautical miles (37 km) off Aux Cayes, Haiti and was abandoned by her crew and passengers. She was on a voyage from London to Jamaica.

== 7 June ==
List of shipwrecks: 7 June 1844
Ship	State	Description
Saucy Jack	United Kingdom	The smack was wrecked on the West Rocks, in the North Sea off the coast of Essex with the loss of a crew member.

== 8 June ==
List of shipwrecks: 8 June 1844
Ship	State	Description
Culloden	United Kingdom	The ship sprang a leak and was beached in Blacksod Bay. She was on a voyage from Ballina, County Mayo to London.
Jeanette	Belgium	The ship ran aground on the Bolvah Heist, off the coast of Zeeland, Netherlands. She was on a voyage from St. Ubes, Portugal to Antwerp. She was refloated and arrived at Antwerp in a leaky condition.
Onceo	United States	The ship ran into Angelo (France) and was beached in the Mississippi River at New Orleans, Louisiana. She was on a voyage from New Orleans to Liverpool, Lancashire, United Kingdom.

== 9 June ==
List of shipwrecks: 9 June 1844
Ship	State	Description
Apollo	United Kingdom	The ship was driven ashore at Ringkøbing, Denmark. She was on a voyage from Newport, Monmouthshire to Stettin. She had become a wreck by 5 July.
Clarence	(United Kingdom of Great Britain and Ireland) New South Wales	The whaler was wrecked on the Chesterfield Bank.
Mary Barry	United Kingdom	The ship sprang a leak and was beached at Baltimore, County Cork. She was on a voyage from Limerick to London.
Oneco	United Kingdom	The ship ran aground at the mouth of the Mississippi River. She was on a voyage from America to Liverpool, Lancashire.

== 10 June ==
List of shipwrecks: 11 June 1844
Ship	State	Description
Pansey	United Kingdom	The ship was driven ashore at Winterton-on-Sea, Norfolk. She was refloated and resumed her voyage.

== 11 June ==
List of shipwrecks: 11 June 1844
Ship	State	Description
Eliza and Mary	United Kingdom	The ship ran aground in Pistolet Bay. She was on a voyage from Poole, Dorset to "Blune Sablons". She was refloated but was consequently condemned.
Erin	United Kingdom	The brig was severely damaged in a collision with the barque William and Mary (United Kingdom) in the Saint Lawrence River.

== 12 June ==
List of shipwrecks: 12 June 1844
Ship	State	Description
Duke	United Kingdom	The ship ran aground on the West Mud Bank, at the mouth of the Mississippi River. She was on a voyage from New Orleans, Louisiana, United States to Liverpool, Lancashire. She was refloated on 15 June and resumed her voyage.
Margaret	United Kingdom	The ship sprang a leak and foundered in St Bride's Bay. Her crew were rescued. She was on a voyage from Porthcawl, Glamorgan to Waterford.

== 13 June ==
List of shipwrecks: 13 June 1844
Ship	State	Description
Cock of the North	United Kingdom	The smack was driven ashore at Cairnbulg, Aberdeenshire. She was on a voyage from the River Spey to Aberdeen. She was refloated and resumed her voyage.
Helen	United Kingdom	The schooner was wrecked at Tampico, Mexico. Her crew survived.

== 14 June ==
List of shipwrecks: 14 June 1844
Ship	State	Description
Ellen	United Kingdom	The ship was driven ashore and wrecked near Halmstad, Sweden. Her crew were rescued. She was on a voyage from Hull, Yorkshire to Königsberg, Prussia.
Fame	United Kingdom	The ship ran aground on the Trinity Sand, in the North Sea. She was on a voyage from Dundee, Forfarshire to Hull. She was refloated but was consequently beached at Grimsby, Lincolnshire.
Seaflower	United Kingdom	The ship was driven ashore and wrecked on St. Paul Island, Nova Scotia, British North America.

== 15 June ==
List of shipwrecks: 15 June 1844
Ship	State	Description
Arvales	United Kingdom	The ship was wrecked on the Falsterbo Reef. Her crew survived. She was on a voyage from Memel, Prussia to Wisbech, Cambridgeshire.
Bazar	Rostock	The ship was driven ashore on "Bramnasbad". She was on a voyage from Riga, Russia to Antwerp, Belgium. She was refloated and put in to Gothenburg, Sweden.
Joseph and Elizabeth	United Kingdom	The ship was wrecked at Morup, Sweden. She was on a voyage from Danzig to London.
Munster Lass	United Kingdom	The brig was wrecked on the east coast of Barbados. Her crew survived.
Soli Deo Glorio	Kingdom of the Two Sicilies	The ship was driven ashore and wrecked west of Kolberg. Her crew were rescued.

== 16 June ==
List of shipwrecks: 16 June 1844
Ship	State	Description
Cádiz	Spain	The ship was wrecked on Düne, Heligoland. Her crew were rescued. She was on a voyage from Cádiz to Hamburg.
Courier	France	The fishing sloop foundered off Lamb Head, Stronsay, Orkney Islands, United Kingdom. Her twelve crew were rescued.
Jeune Cupidon	France	The ship was driven ashore and wrecked at Perranporth, Cornwall, United Kingdom. Her crew were rescued. She was on a voyage from Cardiff, Glamorgan, United Kingdom to Nantes, Loire-Inférieure.
Lucy	United Kingdom	The brig was driven ashore on Düne. She was refloated and put in to the Elbe.
Manchester	Hamburg	The paddle steamer was wrecked in the neighborhood of Riesen Sand, in the North Sea off the mouth of the Elbe with the loss of all on board, about 40 lives. She was on a voyage from Hull to Hamburg.
Palmyra	United Kingdom	The ship was driven ashore at Tralee, County Cork.
Stormont	United Kingdom	The ship was driven ashore and wrecked at the mouth of the River Moy. Her crew were rescued. She was on a voyage from Ballina, County Mayo to London.

== 17 June ==
List of shipwrecks: 17 June 1844
Ship	State	Description
Sir Archibald Campbell	United Kingdom	The ship was wrecked on the Cockburn Reef, in the Torres Strait. Her crew were rescued. She was on a voyage from Sydney, New South Wales to Singapore. Also reported as wrecked on 1 June.

== 18 June ==
List of shipwrecks: 18 June 1844
Ship	State	Description
Eleanor	United Kingdom	The sloop ran aground in the Hilbre Islands, Cheshire and sank. Her crew were rescued. She was on a voyage from Liverpool, Lancashire to Pwllheli, Caernarfonshire.
Princess Victoria	United Kingdom	The cutter ran aground on a reef in Croehn Bay Grenada. She floated off and sank.

== 19 June ==
List of shipwrecks: 19 June 1844
Ship	State	Description
Amelia	(France) Martinique	The schooner capsized off Martinique with the loss of eleven lives.
Edouard	France	The ship was wrecked near Bay Robert, Martinique. All on board were rescued. She was on a voyage from Havre de Grâce, Seine-Inférieure to Port Royal, Jamaica.
Gloucester	United Kingdom	The ship ran aground at Saint Petersburg, Russia. She was on a voyage from Havana, Cuba to Saint Petersburg. She was refloated.
Helena	Kingdom of Hanover	The ship was wrecked on Wangerooge with the loss of all hands. She was on a voyage from Hocksiel to Hull, Yorkshire, United Kingdom.
Jette Maria	Norway	The ship foundered in the Baltic Sea off the Utklippan Lighthouse, Sweden. She was on a voyage from Danzig to King's Lynn, Norfolk, United Kingdom.
Maria I	Spain	The ship was wrecked on the Colorados, off the coast of Cuba. Her crew were rescued. She was on a voyage from Mobile, Alabama, United States to Havana, Cuba.
Palladium	United Kingdom	The ship ran aground at Lowestoft, Suffolk.
Speedwell	(United Kingdom of Great Britain and Ireland) Isle of Man	The ship caught fire at Castletown and was scuttled.
Syrinx	United Kingdom	The ship was driven ashore on Boon Island, Maine, United States and sank. Her crew were rescued. She was on a voyage from the Clyde to Boston, Massachusetts.

== 20 June ==
List of shipwrecks: 20 June 1844
Ship	State	Description
HMS Apollo	Royal Navy	The Lively-class frigate ran aground on the Grain Spit, off the coast of Kent. She was on a voyage from Quebec City, Province of Canada, British North America to Sheerness, Kent. She was refloated the next day and taken in to Chatham, Kent.
Henriette and Bertha	France	The ship ran aground on the Risbank, in the Baltic Sea. She was on a voyage from Port-au-Prince, Haiti to Saint Petersburg, Russia. She was refloated and towed in to Saint Petersburg.
Jean Hastie	United Kingdom	The ship was wrecked on Cranberry Head, Nova Scotia, British North America. Her crew were rescued. She was on a voyage from Boston, Massachusetts, United States to Saint John, New Brunswick, British North America.

== 21 June ==
List of shipwrecks: 21 June 1844
Ship	State	Description
Robert and Margaret	United Kingdom	The ship ran aground in the Elbe. She was on a voyage from the Firth of Forth to Hamburg.
Storfursten	Sweden	The steamship ran aground off Helsinki, Grand Duchy of Finland. All on board were rescued. She was on a voyage from Stockholm to Turku, Grand Duchy of Finland then Reval and Saint Petersburg, Russia.

== 22 June ==
List of shipwrecks: 22 June 1844
Ship	State	Description
Isabella	United Kingdom	The full-rigged ship was wrecked on Flinders Island, Van Diemen's Land. Her passengers and crew were rescued by the brig Flying Fish (United Kingdom). Isabella was on a voyage from Sydney, New South Wales to London.
Success	(United Kingdom of Great Britain and Ireland) British North America	The schooner struck rocks and foundered off "Frisket Island", Nova Scotia. Her crew were rescued. She was on a voyage from Yarmouth, Nova Scotia to Halifax, Nova Scotia.
Thunder	United Kingdom	The ship was abandoned in the Atlantic Ocean off Bermuda with the loss of three lives.

== 24 June ==
List of shipwrecks: 24 June 1844
Ship	State	Description
Active	Prussia	The ship ran aground on the Middle Grounds. She was on a voyage from Memel to Waterford, United Kingdom. She was refloated on 26 June and taken in to Helsingør, Denmark.
Barrington	United States	The ship ran aground on the Swine Bottoms. She was on a voyage from Havana, Cuba to Saint Petersburg, Russia. She was later refloated and resumed her voyage.
Marquis of Huntly (or Marquis of Huntley)	United Kingdom	The ship was driven ashore on "Briton Island" or "Brier Island". Her crew were rescued. She was on a voyage from Quebec City and Rivière-du-Loup, Province of Canada, British North America to Cork with cargo of deals.
Matilda	(United Kingdom of Great Britain and Ireland) New South Wales	The schooner was wrecked at the mouth of the Bellinger River.
Rothschild	United Kingdom	The ship ran aground on the Carysfort Reef. She was on a voyage from Apalachicola, Florida Territory to Liverpool, Lancashire. She was refloated and taken in to Key West, Florida Territory for repairs.

== 25 June ==
List of shipwrecks: 25 June 1844
Ship	State	Description
Anna	Hamburg	The ship foundered off Nordeney, Kingdom of Hanover. She was on a voyage from Hamburg to Nantes, Loire-Inférieure, France.
Galena	United Kingdom	The brig caught fire at Hull, Yorkshire and was scuttled. She was later refloated and beached.
Mary	United Kingdom	The ship was driven ashore at Upgang Chine, Yorkshire. She was refloated on 2 July and taken in to Whitby, Yorkshire.
Mary Ann	United Kingdom	The sloop ran aground on the Brunswick Sand, in the North Sea off the coast of Yorkshire. She was refloated on 6 July.
Pandora	United Kingdom	The ship was abandoned in the Atlantic Ocean. Her crew were rescued by Isabella (United Kingdom). Pandora was on a voyage from Saint John, New Brunswick, British North America to Waterford.
Rapid	United Kingdom	The ship ran aground on the Brake Sand. She was on a voyage from London to Waterford. She was refloated.
Sultan	United Kingdom	The ship ran aground on the Brake Sand. She was on a voyage from London to Waterford. She was refloated.
Thomas P. Cope	United States	The ship was driven ashore at Delaware City, Delaware.
Thunder	United Kingdom	The ship was abandoned in the Atlantic Ocean off Bermuda with the loss of three lives.
Token	United Kingdom	The schooner ran aground on the Brunswick Sand. She was refloated on 6 July.

== 26 June ==
List of shipwrecks: 26 June 1844
Ship	State	Description
Levant	United Kingdom	The ship was wrecked on the Hubert Sandbank, in the Ems. Her crew were rescued. She was on a voyage from Stockton-on-Tees, County Durham to Hamburg.
Mary Ann	United Kingdom	The sloop ran aground on the Runswick Sand, in the North Sea off the coast of Yorkshire.
Ritchie	United Kingdom	The ship was wrecked at St. Shott's, Newfoundland, British North America. Her crew were rescued. She was on a voyage from Quebec City, Province of Canada, British North America to the Clyde.
Token	United Kingdom	The schooner ran aground on the Runswick Sand.

== 27 June ==
List of shipwrecks: 27 June 1844
Ship	State	Description
Aurelian	United Kingdom	The ship was driven ashore at Matane, Province of Canada, British North America. She was refloated on 1 July.
Coronation	United Kingdom	The ship ran aground on the Gunfleet Sand, in the North Sea off the coast of Essex. She was on a voyage from Danzig to London. She was refloated and taken in to Harwich, Essex in a sinking condition.
Courier	(United Kingdom of Great Britain and Ireland) Barbados	The ship ran aground off Saint Lucia and was damaged.
Louise	Norway	The ship was driven ashore at Cromer, Norfolk, United Kingdom. Her crew were rescued. She was on a voyage from Norway to Dieppe, Seine-Inférieure, France.
Success	(United Kingdom of Great Britain and Ireland) British North America	The schooner was lost off Cape Sable Island, Nova Scotia. Her crew were rescued.
Urania	Prussia	The brig was in collision with the schooner Gustave Adolph ( Grand Duchy of Mecklenburg-Schwerin) and was driven ashore at Antwerp, Belgium. She was refloated on 3 July.

== 28 June ==
List of shipwrecks: 28 June 1844
Ship	State	Description
Gleaner	United Kingdom	The barque struck an iceberg and foundered in the Atlantic Ocean (45°30′N 48°50′W). Her fifteen crew were rescued from the wreck on 30 June by Try Again (United Kingdom).
Hannibal	(United Kingdom of Great Britain and Ireland) British North America	The ship was wrecked near "Bartletts River", Nova Scotia. Her crew were rescued. She was on a voyage from New York, United States to Saint John, New Brunswick.
Rosette	United Kingdom	The ship was wrecked on Neckman's Ground, in the Baltic Sea. She was on a voyage from St Davids, Pembrokeshire to Kronstadt Russia.

== 29 June ==
List of shipwrecks: 29 June 1844
Ship	State	Description
Constant	United Kingdom	The ship was driven ashore and wrecked on Boughton Island, Prince Edward Island, British North America. She was on a voyage from London to Trois-Rivières, Province of Canada, British North America.
Urania	United Kingdom	The ship ran aground at Antwerp, Belgium. She was refloated on 3 July and beached.

== 30 June ==
List of shipwrecks: 30 June 1844
Ship	State	Description
Giraffe	United States	The brig was wrecked on the Isle of Pines, Cuba.

== Unknown date ==
List of shipwrecks: Unknown date in June 1844
Ship	State	Description
Anna Dorothea	Norway	The ship was wrecked on the coast of Calvados, France. Her crew were rescued.
Bozzari	Flag unknown	The ship was wrecked at Psara, Kingdom of Greece in early June.
Bristolian	United Kingdom	The ship was lost near Cape Votas, Africa before 28 June. Her crew were rescued.
Camilla	(United Kingdom of Great Britain and Ireland) Van Diemen's Land	The whaler was wrecked in Streaky Bay. Her crew survived.
Carol Mathilde	France	The ship was wrecked on the coast of Calvados with the loss of all hands.
Charlotte	United Kingdom	The ship struck rock off Kerch, Russia and was abandoned by her crew. She was on a voyage from Taganrog, Russia to an English port.
Gondolier	United Kingdom	The ship was wrecked on Vansittart's Rocks, in Gaspar Strait, before 13 June. She was on a voyage from China to London. Joseph found Gondolier abandoned, having lost her rudder, but with all her rigging standing.
Minerva	France	The ship was wrecked at Psara in early June.
Penelope	Flag unknown	The ship was wrecked at Psara in early June.
Robert Watson	United Kingdom	The Humber keel foundered in the North Sea off Seaton, County Durham in mid-June. The wreck came ashore at Coatham, Yorkshire on 29 June.
Sterling	United Kingdom	The ship was abandoned in the Atlantic Ocean before 20 June.
William	United Kingdom	The ship was driven ashore and wrecked at Point la Haye, Newfoundland, British North America. Her crew were rescued. She was on a voyage from Pugwash, Nova Scotia, British North America to Cork.
