= Pioneer Island =

Pioneer Island may refer to:

- Pioneer Island (Nunavut), an island in the Canadian Arctic Archipelago.
- Pioneer Island (Russia), an island in the Severnaya Zemlya group in the Russian Arctic.
- An episode of the animated television series Tom Goes to the Mayor.
