= Dover Island =

Dover Island may refer to:

- Dover Island (Nova Scotia), an island located off the shore of West Dover, Nova Scotia
- Dover Island (Tasmania), an island in the Kent Group, off the north-east coast of Tasmania, Australia
- The Australian rock band.
