= Fleming Island =

Fleming Island may refer to:

Canada

- Fleming Island (New Brunswick), in Nova Scotia
- Fleming Island (Manitoulin), in the Manitoulin region of Ontario
- Fleming Island (Saskatchewan), in Saskatchewan
- Fleming Island (British Columbia) in British Columbia
- Fleming Island (Leeds) in the Leeds region of Ontario

United States

- Fleming Island, Florida, a community in Florida
