= Puffin Island, Newfoundland and Labrador =

Puffin Island, Newfoundland and Labrador may refer to:

- Puffin Island (Baccalieu Tickle), Newfoundland and Labrador, Canada
- Puffin Island (Greenspond), Newfoundland and Labrador, Canada
