= River Landing =

Development in Saskatoon, Saskatchewan, Canada

Coordinates: 52.1226°N 106.6658°W

River Landing is an ongoing redevelopment district in Saskatoon, Saskatchewan, that will create a commercial/cultural development along the bank of the South Saskatchewan River in downtown Saskatoon.

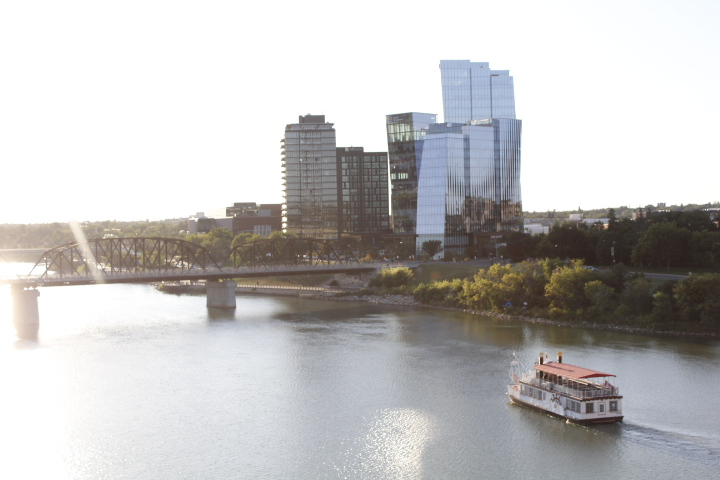

River Landing is divided into two phases. The first phase concentrates on the eastern region of River Landing and includes redeveloping the waterfront, a hotel complex, and a destination complex. The second phase concentrates on the western region, including the cleanup of the old A. L Cole site (a decommissioned electrical power plant that had been torn down in the 1990s), parkland, and the conversion of a pre-existing electrical service building into a year-round home for the farmer's market (now relocated to 2600 Koyl Ave near the airport), business centre and residential development.

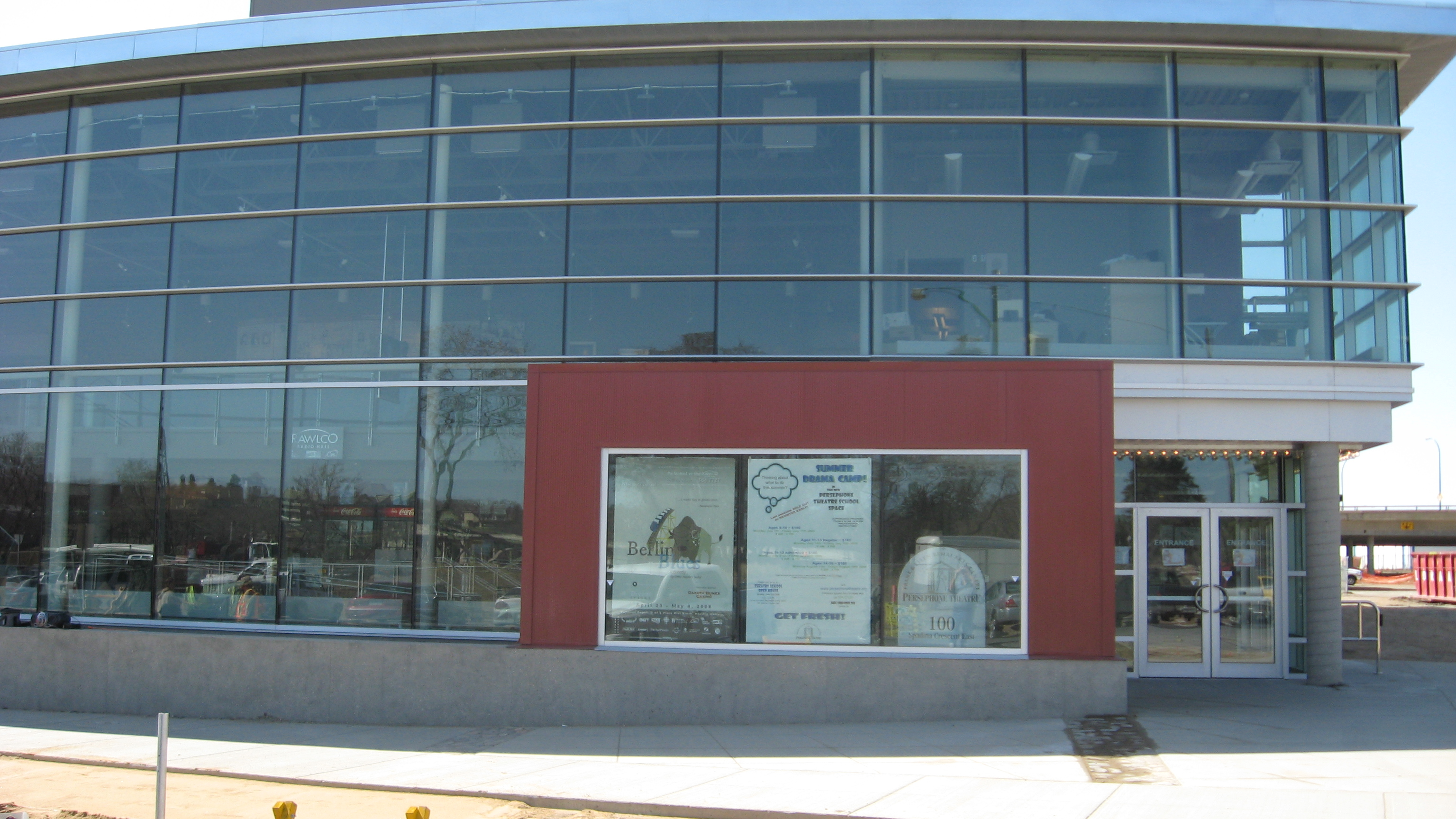
Persephone Theatre

== History ==
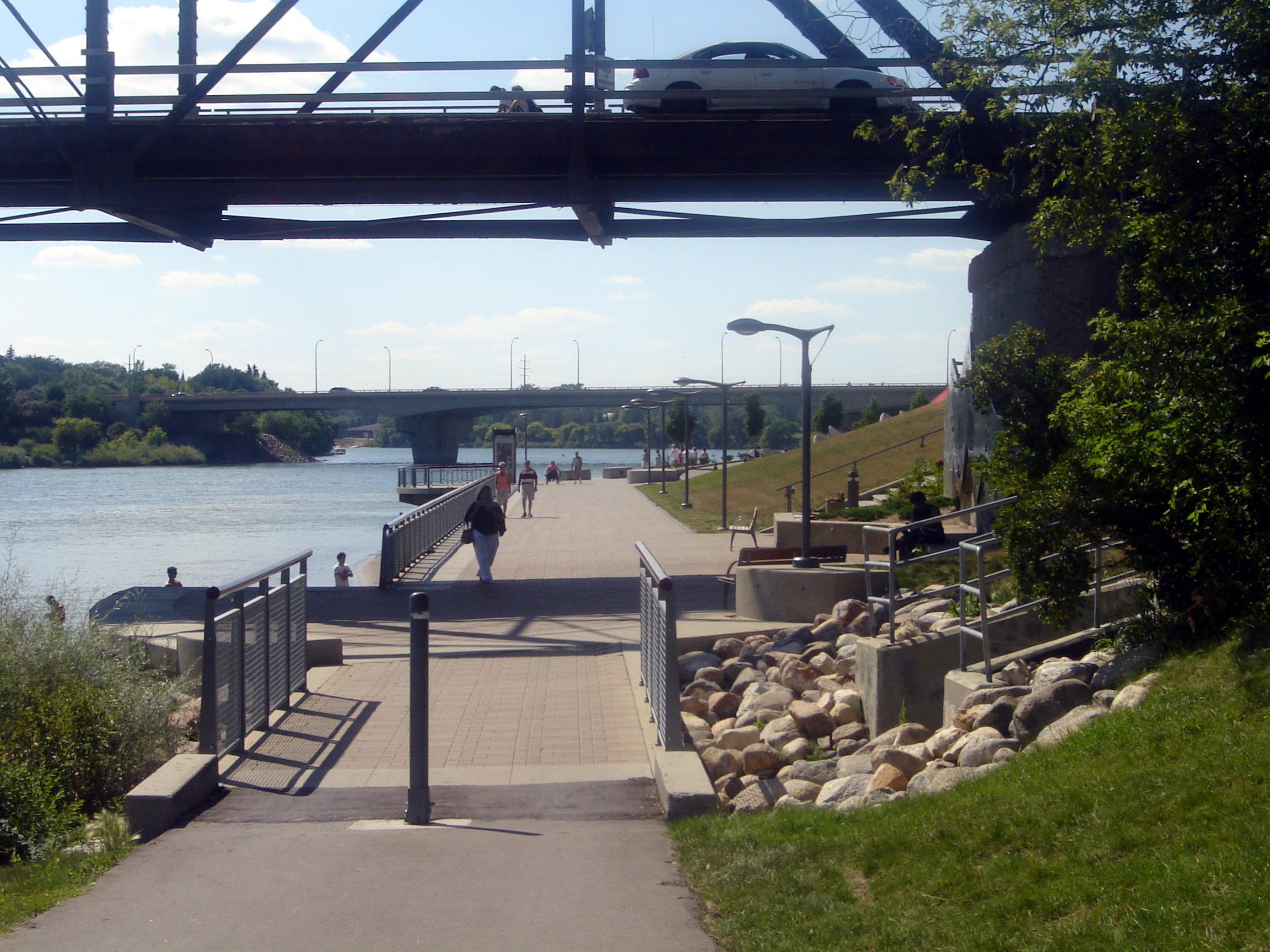
Riverbank promenade

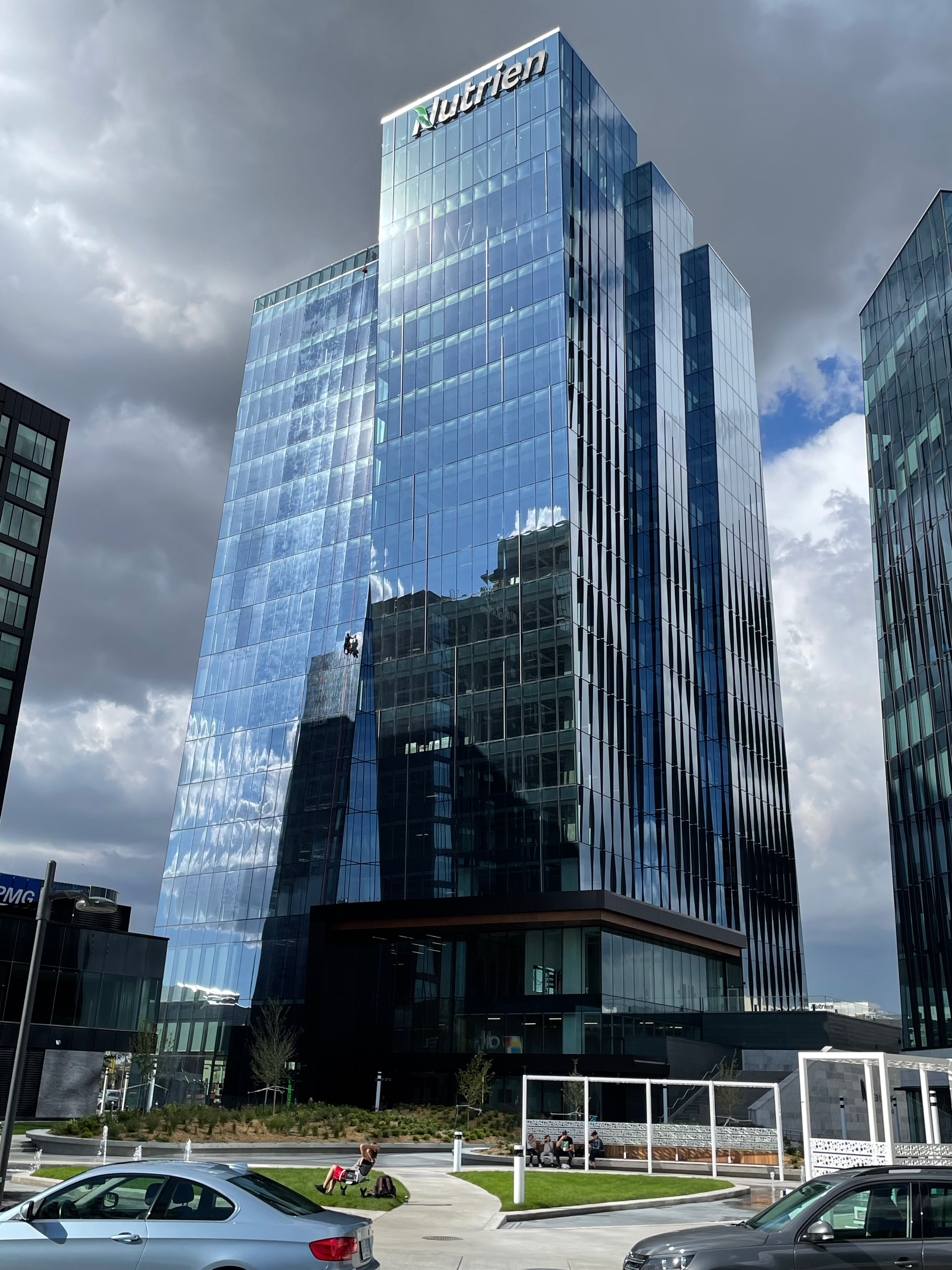
Nutrien Tower is the tallest building in Saskatchewan, the headquarters of Nutrien, and the last major building to be completed in the River Landing complex.

Plans for redevelopment of the riverbank have come and gone since the 1970s. One of the first steps towards redeveloping the area was the demolishing of the old Saskatoon Arena in the early 1980s; at one point, there were plans to build a new hockey rink and convention centre on the site, but ultimately it was decided to build Saskatchewan Place (now Credit Union Centre) on the city's outskirts. In 1989, the Arena site became an outdoor entertainment venue in conjunction with that year's Canada Summer Games and proved popular enough that there was talk of the site becoming a permanent outdoor venue. Around this time, the city unveiled plans for a market and hotel on the site as part of its South Downtown Redevelopment scheme, which also involved redeveloping several adjacent blocks to the north.

In the early 1990s, despite much criticism, the city council of the day abandoned the market/hotel plan and instead allowed the construction of a senior citizen's residence tower on the former arena site. There was also increased concern regarding rising crime in the neighboring Riversdale community. Despite this, plans for redeveloping the remaining riverbank lands as a cultural, commercial, and entertainment area continued. In the 1990s, the A.L. Cole power plant was demolished after sitting unused for nearly a decade, followed in the mid-2000s by the demolition of the Gathercole Building (once Riverview Collegiate), which had formerly housed the Saskatoon Board of Education offices. It was last used as a hospital set in the filming of a short-lived television show.

The last major hurdle towards the redevelopment of the site was cleared in 2005 when an agreement was reached with the Royal Canadian Legion over the sale of their building; however, later that year, the project encountered a stumbling block when the city announced the sudden closure of the century-old Traffic Bridge due to safety concerns; the bridge was expected to be a major access route into River Landing. After considering the possibility of replacing the bridge—an option criticized by the developers of River Landing—the city instead chose to repair the bridge, and it reopened to vehicular traffic in September 2006. Along with the project, a roundabout was constructed at the foot of the bridge, the second to be built in Saskatoon. Lastly, on January 10, 2016, after being closed yet again in August 2010, the first phase out of a two phase campaign to demolish the over 110 year old bridge concluded once explosive charges were detonated on two southern spans of the bridge. The northernmost spans were detonated on February 7, 2016, with the last remnants of the structure being torn on November 17th, allowing the construction of a modernized Traffic Bridge to commence.

Later, in October 2016, development began on the new mixed-use complex known as River Landing Towers. The plans involved 4 high-rise buildings, including 2 office towers, a mixed-use condo, and a hotel attached to the condo. The high-rise complex was originally planned to be completed within 2 years; this goal could not be met as plans were still being finalized. River Landing No. 1, the mixed-use condo, was completed in 2019, at a height of 70.92 m (232.7 ft), followed by RBC Tower later that year at 59.52 m (195.3 ft), and finally Nutrien Tower two years later at 88.5 m (290 ft), becoming the tallest building in Saskatoon, as well as in Saskatchewan. In November 2022, it was reported that some of Nutrien Tower's glass panels may have fractured due to a manufacturing defect.

== Phase one ==
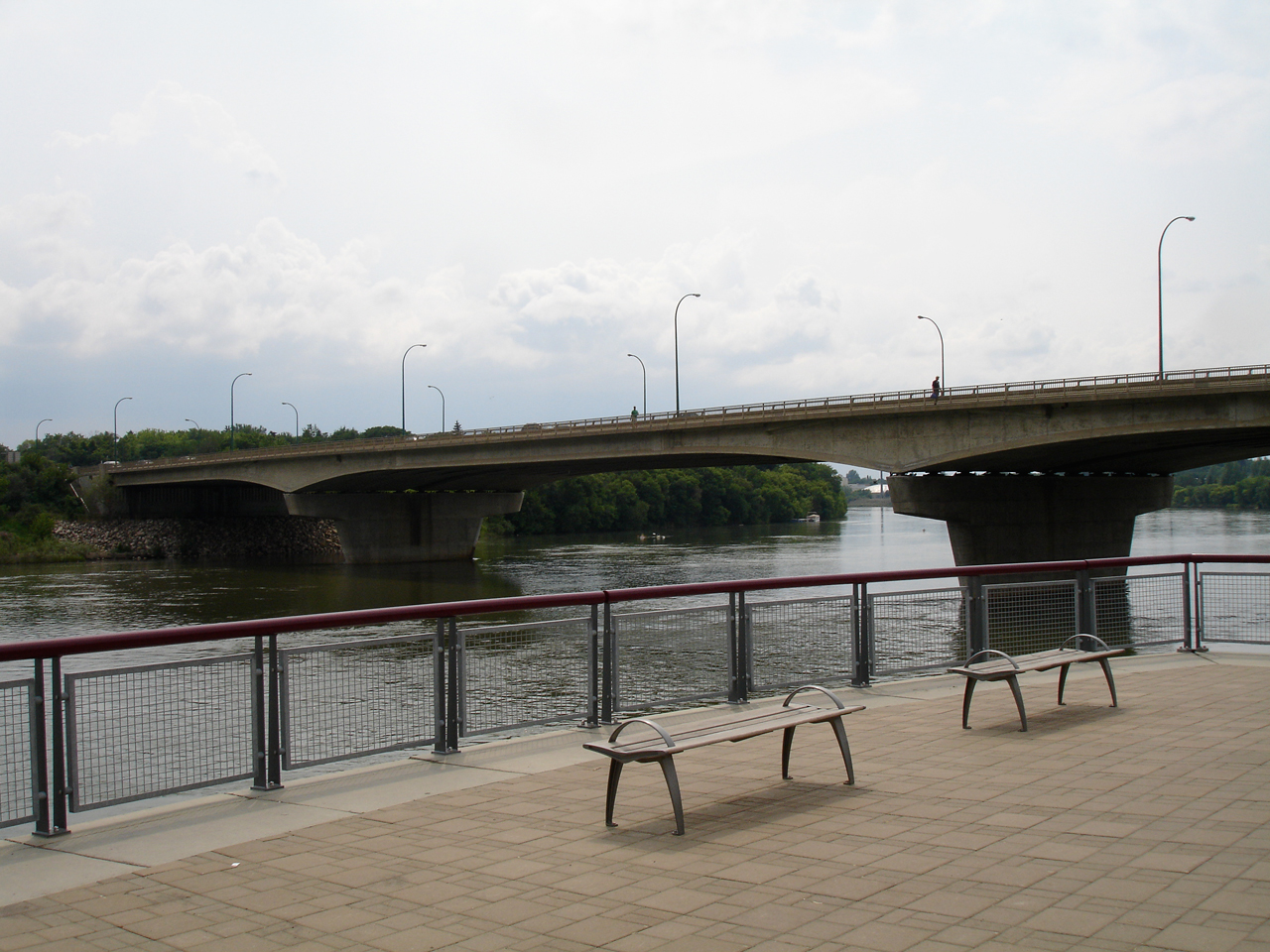
River Landing promenade overlooking the Senator Sid Buckwold Bridge

Phase one consists of:

- riverfront promenade walkway with path art
- children's water park area
- amphitheaters
- century plaza consisting of "Prairie Wind" artwork by Lee-Koopman Projects/Fristad Downing Henry Architects
- other public art
- River Landing Towers – a multi-purpose complex consisting of offices, condominiums, hotels and retail.
- fire vessel

== Phase two ==
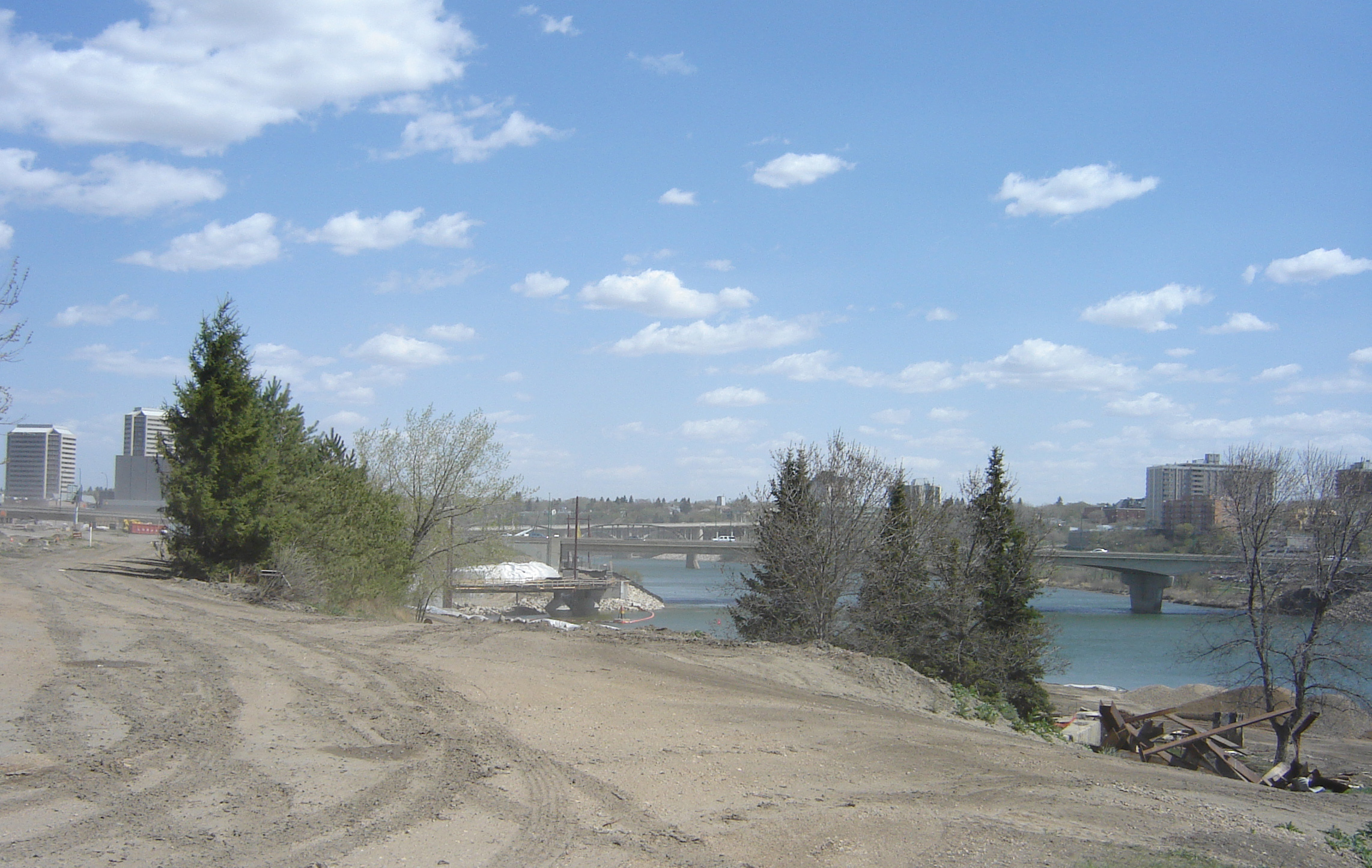
Riverbank construction near the Senator Sid Buckwold Bridge

Phase two consists of:

- Saskatoon Farmer's Market, which has now relocated to 2600 Koyl Ave near the airport
- business center
- village square
- sounds/visual shielding around the electrical substation
- residential housing

== See also ==
- Riversdale, Saskatoon
- Central Business District, Saskatoon
