= Johns Island (Saskatchewan) =

Island in Saskatchewan, Canada

- Location in Saskatchewan Johns Island (Saskatchewan) (Canada)

Geography
- Location: Cree Lake
- Coordinates: 57°33′00″N 106°38′02″W

Administration
- Canada
- Province: Saskatchewan
- Rural municipality: Northern Saskatchewan Administration District

Demographics
- Population: 0

Johns Island is a small island in Cree Lake in the Canadian province of Saskatchewan. It was named after Irving Lawrence Johns as part of the GeoMemorial Commemorative Naming Program that honours soldiers who died in the service of Canada. He died in a training accident during World War II on 26 January 1945.

== See also ==
- List of islands of Saskatchewan
- Recursive islands and lakes
