= Cree Lake =

Lake in Saskatchewan, Canada

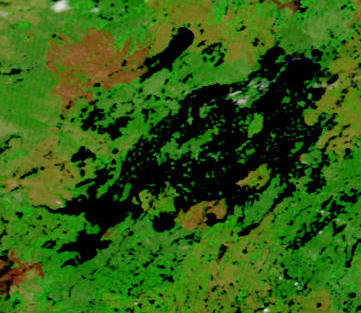
- Satellite image of Cree Lake

- Location of Cree Lake in Saskatchewan Cree Lake (Canada)
- Location: Northern Administration District, Saskatchewan
- Coordinates: 57°30′N 106°30′W
- Lake type: Glacial lake
- Part of: Mackenzie River drainage basin
- Primary inflows: Brustad River; Karras River; Routledge River
- River sources: Canadian Shield
- Primary outflows: Cree River
- Catchment area: 4,468 km^{2} (1,725 sq mi)
- Basin countries: Canada
- Max. length: 81 km (50 mi)
- Max. width: 57 km (35 mi)
- Surface area: 143,400 ha (354,000 acres)
- Average depth: 14.9 m (49 ft)
- Max. depth: 60 m (200 ft)
- Water volume: 17,600,000 dam^{3} (14,300,000 acre⋅ft)
- Shore length^{1}: 2,180 km (1,350 mi)
- Surface elevation: 487 m (1,598 ft)
- Islands: Auriat Island; Cowie Island; Flemming Island; Ispatinow Island; Johns Island; Turner Island
- ^{1} Shore length is not a well-defined measure.

Cree Lake is a large glacial lake in the Canadian province of Saskatchewan. The lake is the fourth largest in the province and is located west of Reindeer Lake and south of Lake Athabasca in the Mackenzie River drainage basin. Cree Lake is the remnant of a large proglacial lake that flowed south into the Churchill River during the last ice age.

Cree Lake has no highway access. Floatplanes are the means used to access the lodges and amenities on the lake.

== Description ==
Cree Lake is in the Canadian Shield in Saskatchewan's Northern Administration District. Covering an area of 143,400 hectares (354,000 acres), it is Saskatchewan's fourth largest lake. It spans a length of 81 kilometres (50 mi), a width of 57 kilometres (35 mi), and has a depth of about 60 metres (200 ft). The lake has many islands and a jagged shoreline that measures about 2,180 kilometres (1,350 mi) long. Several rivers feed the lake with the larger ones being Brustad River, Karras River, and Routledge River. Cree River, the lake's outflow, flows out at the northern end and heads north into Black Lake, which is connected to Lake Athabasca via the Fond du Lac River. The whole system is part of the Mackenzie River drainage basin.

South of Cree Lake is a portage that connects it to the Mudjatik River, which is a tributary of the Churchill River. The Churchill River flows east into the Hudson Bay.

=== Proglacial lake ===
Cree Lake is the remnant of a much larger proglacial lake. The proglacial lake was formed by the meltwaters of retreating continental glaciers during the last ice age about 8,700 years ago. This proglacial lake flowed south into the Churchill River drainage basin via glacial spillways. After the retreat of the glaciers, isostatic rebound redirected Cree Lake's outflow to the north. The lake's current elevation is 487 metres (1,598 ft) above sea level while that proglacial lake reached a height of 520 metres (1,710 ft).

== Cree Lake settlements ==
There are three Indian reserves on the lake; Cree Lake 192G and Cable Bay 192M are at the south-west corner and Barkwell Bay 192I is at the northern end on Barkwell Bay. The reserves are part of the English River Dene Nation.

A Dene settlement with an airport was located on the south-west shore of the lake (57°21′15.19″N 107°7′41.52″W). It may have been the location of a Hudson's Bay Company trading post from 1891 to 1902. In 1971 there were 36 residents (22 were First Nations). Another settlement was located at the north-east end of the lake near the Cree River outflow. In the 1960s it had an airport, a small log church and numerous houses (57°42′39″N 106°15′49″W). A fish plant on Turner Island was built in 1957 by Waite Fisheries.

Other locations on Cree Lake with populations in the 1970s were the Cree Lake Weather Station in the south-west at the entrance to Cable Bay and an airfield (with 10 people) there operated by the Canadian Government. On Turner Island, there was the Cree Lake DNS Radio Station (Department of Northern Saskatchewan) with 10 people and a camp at the north-end with 15 people.

== Recreation and amenities ==
Crystal Lodge is a fly-in fishing lodge on Ispatinow Island in Cree Lake. The lodge has cabins, walled tents, a firepit area, and 16 or 18-foot aluminum boats for guests. Access to the lodge is from Cree Lake/Crystal Lodge (Midgett Field) Aerodrome and Cree Lake (Crystal Lodge) Water Aerodrome.

At the northern end of the lake, at the southern tip of Rushmer Peninsula, is another fly-in lodge called Cree Lake Lodge. It has guided fishing tours and bear hunts.

== Fish species ==
Fish species include walleye, yellow perch, northern pike, lake trout, lake whitefish, cisco, burbot, Arctic grayling, white sucker, and longnose sucker.

== GeoMemorial Commemorative Naming Program ==
The GeoMemorial Commemorative Naming Program is a program that names geographical features in honour of those who lost their lives in the service of Canada. Many islands in Cree Lake have been name through this program:

- Pelletier Island — named after John Pelletier
- Turner Island — named after Alfred Gordon Turner
- Rogers Island — named after Sidney John Rogers
- Long Island — named after Lindsay Lester Long
- Keeping Island — named after John Ross Keeping
- Fleming Island — named after Kenneth Gordon Fleming
- Johns Island — named after Irving Lawrence Johns
- Morrison Island — named after Earl Wellington Morrison
- Dixon Island — named after Garth Lavain Dixon
- Currie Island — Arthur Archibald Currie
- Davies Island — named after Leonard Owen Davies
- Dahl Island — named after William Earl Dahl
- Davidson Island — named after Marvin Davidson
- Auriat Island — named after Jean Marie Joseph Auriat

== See also ==
- List of lakes of Saskatchewan
- Tourism in Saskatchewan
