= Christopher J. Yorath =

Welsh-Canadian engineer (1879–1932)

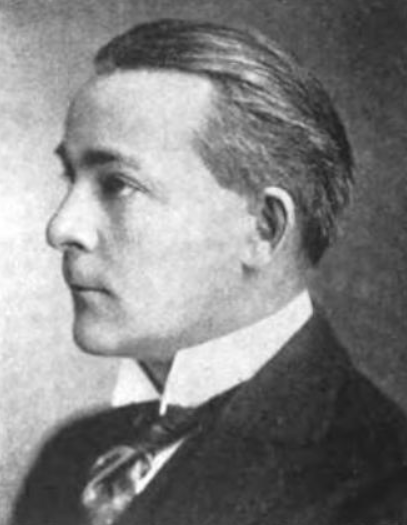
- Born: Christopher James Yorath; 1879; Cardiff, Wales
- Died: April 2, 1932 (aged 52–53); Calgary, Alberta
- Education: University of Wales
- Occupations: Engineer, urban planner
- Spouse: Emily Kestell (m. 1909)
- Children: 3

Christopher James Yorath (1879 – April 2, 1932) was a Welsh-Canadian engineer and urban planner.

== Biography ==
Yorath was born in Cardiff, Wales in 1879 and attended grade school there from 1889 to 1895. He graduated in engineering from the University of Wales in 1898.

Yorath worked for an engineering contractor in Cardiff until 1900 when he became Assistant to the Cardiff City Engineer; later in 1908 becoming Chief Assistant Engineer & Surveyor to the Acton Urban District Council; in 1912 becoming Deputy Engineer to the Acton Borough Engineer while from 1908 to 1909 lecturing at the Westminster Technical Institute in London. He married Emily Kestell in 1909, and they had three children.

In 1913 Yorath emigrated from England to Saskatoon, Saskatchewan, Canada to take on the role of commissioner of Saskatoon and city treasurer during the war years. As commissioner he developed an urban plan called the Plan for Greater Saskatoon, that emphasized park space, civic areas, roads, tramways, and a "ring road" or "encircling boulvevard" (eventually realized as Circle Drive).

He was quoted as saying "Our aim should be to make Saskatoon a 'garland city'.... Our city should be beautiful and well planned, characterised by cleanliness and with a residential section assuring amenity from the turmoil and stress of public life." and "My conception is a garden city. It should be beautiful and flowery. If we allow Saskatoon to grow on the check-board system, we will come in for the contempt of the future generation. We should plan out our city so that sewerage and waterworks will be laid that it may be best used for a large city." After extensive debate with the mayor of the day Alexander MacGillivray Young, he resigned to take on the role of Commissioned of Edmonton,

Starting in 1921 he was City Commissioner for Edmonton. He enacted a racial segregation policy, which Labour city councillors Ald. Rice Sheppard, James East and Dan Knott helped overturn. He resigned as a result.

From 1924 until 1926 he served as president of both the Northwestern Utilities Limited (electrical and gas supplier to Edmonton) and the Canadian Western Natural Gas, Light, Heat & Power Co. (supplier to Calgary and Lethbridge).

In 1926 he moved to Nanaimo, British Columbia to take on the role of president and managing director of the Nanaimo Electric Light, Power and Heating Co.

He died in Calgary on April 2, 1932.

== Controversy ==
In 1923, under the advisement of Christopher Yorath in his role of Edmonton's City Commissioner, the council passed legislation banning black citizens from using the public swimming pools. When a committee of prominent black Edmontonians led by Willetta Poston challenged the rule in 1924, Christopher Yorath responded that he personally thought a white man and a Black man "should not enter the same pool and that the order must stand." The committee then appealed directly to the city council. City council overturned the rule, and Yorath resigned in protest.

== Honors ==
In recognitions of Christopher Yorath's contributions:

- Yorath Avenue in Avalon, Saskatoon is named in his honor
- Yorath Island in the South Saskatchewan River is named in his honor; coincidentally, Yorath's 1913 planning proposal suggested that the island be used as part of the river crossing for one of his proposed "encircling boulevards"
