= Auriat Island =

Island in Saskatchewan, Canada

- Location in Saskatchewan Auriat Island (Canada)

Geography
- Location: Cree Lake
- Coordinates: 57°28′00″N 106°32′02″W
- Highest elevation: 499 m (1637 ft)

Administration
- Canada
- Province: Saskatchewan
- Rural municipality: Northern Saskatchewan Administration District

Demographics
- Population: 0

Auriat Island is a small island within Cree Lake in the northern part of the Canadian province of Saskatchewan. The island is named after Jean Auriat who was a Canadian soldier in the North Shore New Brunswick Regiment during World War II. He was killed in action by shrapnel on 7 June 1944 while attacking a German radar station in Douvres, France.

== Geography ==
Auriat Island is an island in an archipelago on Cree Lake, which is in the Athabasca Plain ecoregion. The island is very rugged and the soil is not arable due to permafrost underneath the soil. Cree Lake freezes over during the winters. Summers are short and mildly warm.

== Name ==
Auriat Island is named after Jean Auriat, a Canadian soldier killed during World War II. The Auriat family operated a farm in Saint-Front, Saskatchewan. During World War II, four Auriats joined the military. On 6 June 1944, Jean and Maurice Auriat landed on Juno Beach with fellow Canadians. The following day, their regiment launched an attack on the a German radar station in Douvres, Normandy. Jean was hit with shrapnel, and Maurice used his entire medical kit, however, he was ordered to advance, leaving Jean behind.

Jean is buried in the Douvres war cemetery with ten other Canadians. Maurice was wounded the same day. The rest of the family survived the war. Following the war, the Canadian government offered a program to honour veterans of the war by naming landmarks. The family filed a request and Auriat Island was named.

== See also ==
- List of islands of Saskatchewan
- Recursive islands and lakes
