= Barren Island =

Barren Island or Barren Islands may refer to:

== Books ==
- Baren Island by Carol Zoref

== Geography ==
=== Australia ===
- Barren Island (Tasmania)
- Cape Barren Island, Tasmania

=== Canada ===
- Barren Island, Newfoundland and Labrador
- Barren Island (Nova Scotia)
- Barren Island (Ontario)

=== Falkland Islands ===
- Barren Island (Falkland Islands)

=== India ===
- Barren Island (Andaman Islands)

=== Madagascar ===
- Barren Isles (Nosy Barren) Melaky region

=== United States ===
- Barren Islands, Alaska
- Barren Island, Brooklyn, New York
- Barren Island (Hudson River), New York
- Barren Island (Maryland)
- Barren Island in Palmyra Atoll, US Minor Outlying Islands
- Barren Island (Washington)
