= Bergesen Island =

Island in Nunavut, Canada

- Location within Nunavut Location within Canada

Geography
- Location: Northern Canada
- Coordinates: 71°37′48″N 073°18′00″W
- Archipelago: Arctic Archipelago
- Length: 11 km (6.8 mi)
- Width: 8.5 km (5.28 mi)

Administration
- Canada
- Territory: Nunavut
- Region: Qikiqtaaluk

Demographics
- Population: Uninhabited

Bergesen Island is an uninhabited island located in the Qikiqtaaluk Region of Nunavut, Canada. It is located in Baffin Bay off the northeastern coast of Baffin Island. Adams Island is 22.3 km (13.9 mi) to the south, while Dexterity Island is 17.2 km (10.7 mi) to the east, across Isbjorn Strait. The Dymond Islands lie close to its southwest.
