= Dog Island (Alberta) =

Island in Alberta, Canada

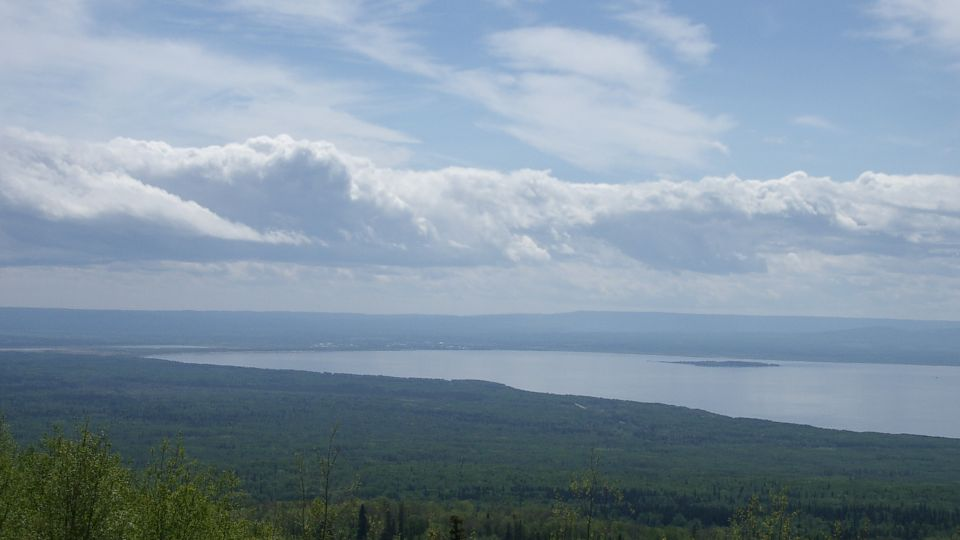
- A view of Lesser Slave Lake, with Dog Island visible in the middle

- Location within Alberta Location within Canada

Geography
- Location: Slave Lake
- Coordinates: 55°19′37″N 114°49′14″W
- Area: 0.522 km^{2} (0.202 sq mi)

Administration
- Canada
- Province: Alberta
- Municipal district: Lesser Slave River No. 124

Demographics
- Population: Uninhabited

Dog Island is an uninhabited island located on the eastern side of Lesser Slave Lake near the town of Slave Lake in Alberta, Canada.

== Name origin ==
The name comes from the sled dogs that used to be left on the island by fur traders during the summer.

== History ==
There was originally a fishery on the island ran by the Hudson's Bay Company where they left out fish for their sled dogs. During the early 20th century, steamships were used to transport travellers between Salteaux and Grouard on opposite sides of the lake. Many of these travellers would then continue on to the Grouard-Peace River trail to reach the highly sought after fertile land of the Peace River Country. The main steamship who did this journey was the Northern Light which was captained by Hermann Nicklaus, a German immigrant who along with his wife and two Irish immigrants, lived on a homestead on the island where they raised chickens and cattle. After the railway came through, making the use of steamships obsolete, the island was leased to a commercial fishing company. Eventually the island was made part of Lesser Slave Lake Provincial Park. In 2013, a canoe carrying two boys capsized just south of the island, one of the boys was rescued one hour later but the other drowned.

== See also ==
- List of islands of Canada
