= Iori =

Iori is a personal name in Japanese and in Welsh (where it is a diminutive of Iorwerth).

== People ==
- Miyamoto Iori (宮本 伊織; 1612–1678), famed swordsman from the Edo period of Japan
- Iori Saeki (佐伯 伊織; born 1994), Japanese singer and voice actress
- Iori Katsura (桂 依央利; born 1991), Japanese baseball catcher
- Iori Kogawa (古川 いおり; born 1992), Japanese pornographic (AV) actress
- Iori Kimura (木村 偉織; born 1999), Russian Japanese racing driver
- Iori Nomizu (野水 伊織; born 1985), Japanese actress, voice actress and singer
- Iori Yamasaki (山崎 伊織; born 1998), Japanese baseball player
- Iori Namihira (浪平 伊織; born 1983), Japanese motorcycle racer
- Iori Katsura (桂 依央利; born 1991), Japanese baseball player
- Manuel Iori (born 1983), Italian footballer who plays for Serie B side Livorno

== Characters ==
- Iori Hida (Cody Hida in English dub), a character from Digimon Adventure 02
- Iori Yagami, an SNK character in the King of Fighters video games
- Iori Minase, a character in the Japanese media franchise The Idolm@ster
- Iori Nagase, a character from the anime/manga/light novel series Kokoro Connect
- Iori Yoshizuki, one of the main characters from the manga series I"s
- Iori Davies, a character in the Welsh language television series Pobol y Cwm
- Iori Asahina, a character in the Otome game Brothers Conflict
- Iori Shirou, a character from the anime Kill la Kill
- Iori Kitahara, the main protagonist in the manga series Grand Blue
- Iori Izumi, real name of Kamen Rider Ibuki, a character in Tokusatsu series Kamen Rider Hibiki
- Iori Shiromi, a character from the role-playing game Blue Archive
- Iori Utahime, a supporting character in Jujutsu Kaisen
- Iori Izumi, a main character in the game and anime franchise IDOLiSH7
- Iori Himemiya, a supporting character in The Pet Girl of Sakurasou
- Iori Samura, a character in Kagurabachi

== Other uses ==
- Iori (river), Azerbaijan and Georgia
