= Iorwerth =

Iorwerth (Welsh pronunciation: [ˈjɔrwɛrθ]) is a Welsh name, composed of two elements: iôr meaning 'lord' and berth meaning 'fair', 'fine', or 'handsome' (both morphemes are somewhat archaic in Modern Welsh). The name has historically been associated with the name Edward, although the names do not have a common origin and neither name is a translation of the other.

Bearers of the name include:

- Iorwerth Beli (fl. second half of the 14th century), Welsh language poet
- Iorwerth ap Bleddyn (1053–1111), prince of Powys in eastern Wales
- Iorwerth Drwyndwn (1145–1174), son of Owain Gwynedd, king of Gwynedd
  - His son Llywelyn ap Iorwerth (1172–1240), Llywelyn the Great, de facto ruler over most of Wales
- Iorwerth (bishop of St Davids) (fl. 1215)
- Thomas Iorwerth Ellis OBE (1899–1970), Welsh classicist and author
- Iorwerth Evans (1906–1985), rugby union footballer of the 1930s
- Iorwerth Hirflawdd, ancestor of various medieval rulers in mid Wales
- Iorwerth Isaac (1911–1966), Welsh dual-code international rugby flanker
- Iorwerth Jones (1903–1983), Welsh rugby union and professional rugby league footballer
- Iorwerth Peate (1901–1982), Welsh poet and scholar
- Iorwerth Thomas (1895–1966), Welsh Labour Party politician
- Rhun ap Iorwerth (born 1972), Welsh Plaid Cymru politician and First Minister of Wales since 2026

== See also ==
- Iolo
- Iori (disambiguation)
- Yorath
