= Ispatinow Island =

Island in Saskatchewan, Canada

- Location in Saskatchewan Ispatinow Island (Canada)

Geography
- Location: Cree Lake
- Coordinates: 57°30′00″N 106°37′02″W

Administration
- Canada
- Province: Saskatchewan
- Rural municipality: Northern Saskatchewan Administration District

Ispatinow Island is an island in Cree Lake in the Northern Administration District of the Canadian province of Saskatchewan. It is the largest island on Cree Lake.

At the western end of the island is a fly-in fishing lodge. The lodge has cabins, walled tents, a firepit area, and 16 or 18-foot aluminum boats for guests. It is serviced by two airports — Cree Lake/Crystal Lodge (Midgett Field) Aerodrome and Cree Lake (Crystal Lodge) Water Aerodrome.

== See also ==
- List of islands of Saskatchewan
- Recursive islands and lakes
