= Barren, Missouri =

Ghost town in Missouri, United States

Coordinates: 36°49′41″N 91°00′51″W

Barren is an extinct town in southern Carter County, in the Ozarks of southeastern Missouri, United States. The community was located on the banks of Big Barren Creek, (a tributary of the Current River) just north of the Carter - Ripley county line. The area is within the Mark Twain National Forest.

A post office called Barren was established in 1887, and remained in operation until 1932. The community took its name from Big Barren Creek.
