= Daphne Island =

Island in Alberta, Canada

- Interactive map of Daphne Island

Geography
- Location: Athabasca River
- Coordinates: 57.2792°N 111.6614°W
- Adjacent to: Athabasca River

Administration
- Canada
- Province: Alberta

Daphne Island is a river island in Alberta, Canada. It is in the Athabasca River, located north of Fort McMurray.

Daphne Island was named for Daphne Wallace, the daughter of a surveyor.
