= Fleming Island (Saskatchewan) =

Island in Saskatchewan, Canada

- Location in Saskatchewan Fleming Island (Saskatchewan) (Canada)

Geography
- Location: Cree Lake
- Coordinates: 57°23′00″N 106°53′02″W

Administration
- Canada
- Province: Saskatchewan
- Rural municipality: Northern Saskatchewan Administration District

Demographics
- Population: 0

Fleming Island is a small island in the south-western part of Cree Lake in the Canadian province of Saskatchewan. It was named after Kenneth Gordon Fleming as part of the GeoMemorial Commemorative Naming Program that honours soldiers who died in service of Canada. He was killed in action during World War II on 8 August 1944.

In 2008, Titan Uranium conducted exploration drilling on the island looking for uranium, building on earlier exploration activities conducted by other mining companies on the island.

== See also ==
- List of islands of Saskatchewan
- Recursive islands and lakes
