= Turner Island (Saskatchewan) =

Island in Saskatchewan, Canada

- Location in Saskatchewan Turner Island (Saskatchewan) (Canada)

Geography
- Location: Cree Lake
- Coordinates: 57°23′22.14″N 106°38′19.66″W

Administration
- Canada
- Province: Saskatchewan
- Rural municipality: Northern Saskatchewan Administration District

Demographics
- Population: 0

Turner Island is a small island in the southwestern part of Cree Lake in the Canadian province of Saskatchewan. It was named after Alfred Gordon Turner as part of the GeoMemorial Commemorative Naming Program, honouring soldiers who died in the service of Canada. He was killed in action during World War II on 2 November 1942.

A fish plant was built on the island in 1957 by Waite Fisheries, located at coordinates 57°23′57″N 106°40′10″W. In the 1970s, there was the Cree Lake DNS Radio Station (Department of Northern Saskatchewan) on the island with 10 people. There was also a camp at the island's north end with 15 people.

== See also ==
- List of islands of Saskatchewan
- Recursive islands and lakes
