= Kikkertavak Island =

Island in Newfoundland and Labrador, Canada

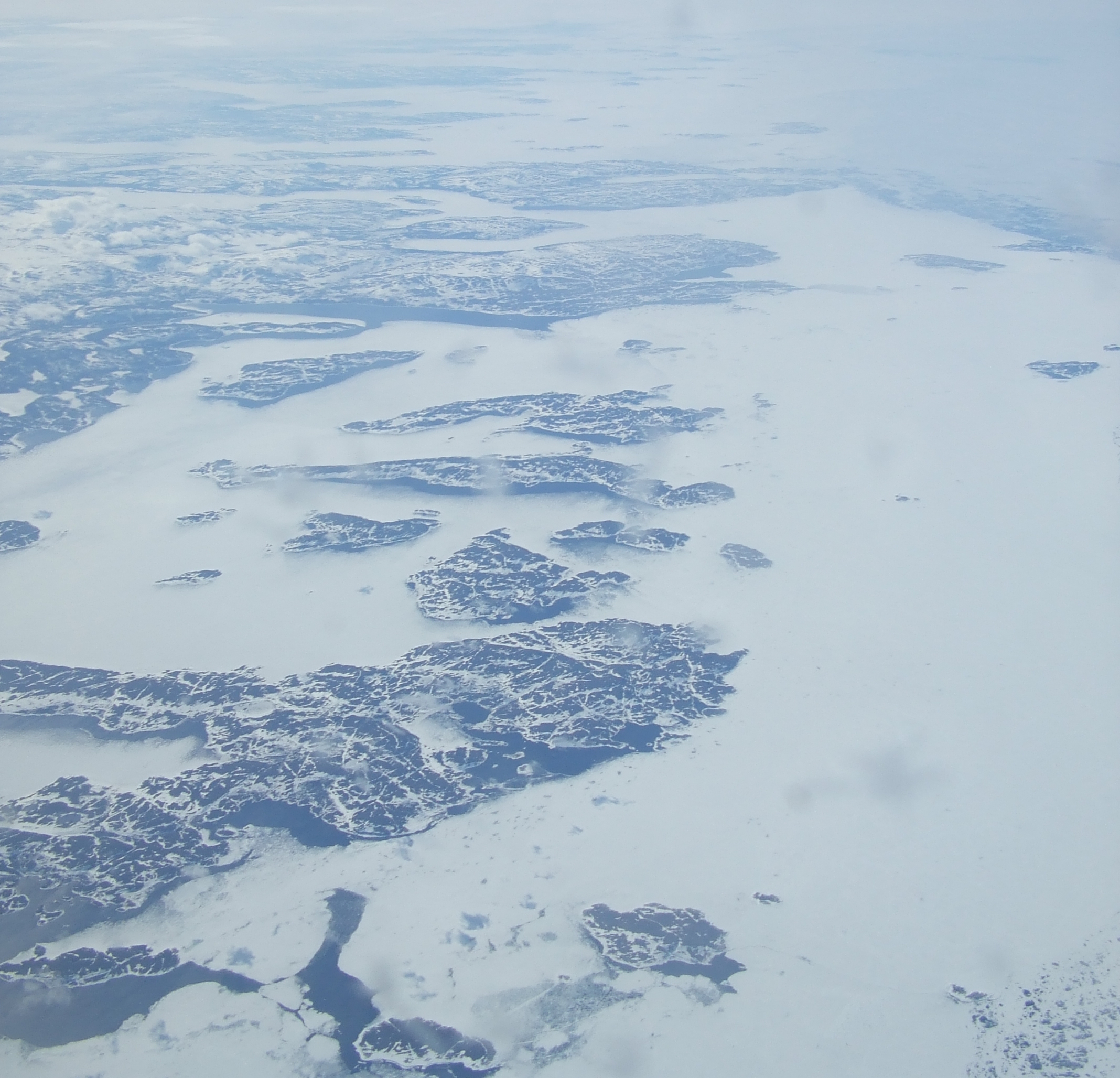
- Interactive map of Kikkertavak Island

Geography
- Location: Labrador Sea
- Coordinates: 54°57′27″N 58°42′05″W

Administration
- Canada
- Province: Newfoundland and Labrador

Kikkertavak Island is a small island in the Adlavik Islands, which is part of the Canadian province of Newfoundland and Labrador. It is composed primarily of syenite, syenodiorite and granite. It is on the north coast of Labrador and in the west of the Labrador Sea.
