= Yorath Island =

Island in Saskatchewan, Canada

- Interactive map of Yorath Island

Geography
- Location: R. M. Corman Park, Saskatchewan
- Coordinates: 52°05′00″N 106°43′02″W
- Area: 0.236 sq mi (0.61 km^{2})

Administration
- Canada

Demographics
- Population: 0

Yorath Island is a small island, 151 acres (61 ha) in size, in the South Saskatchewan River just outside the southern boundaries of the city of Saskatoon, Saskatchewan, Canada. The island is relatively new, and did not exist when the land was first surveyed in 1903. This island is managed by the Meewasin Valley Authority; it is not accessible by road (although some maps of the area plot a non-existent north–south grid road on the island), but can be seen from the Maple Grove (formerly Leisureland) area. The island is named after Christopher J. Yorath, who in 1913 became the commissioner of Saskatoon. Yorath is best known for an extensive, forward-thinking planning document published in 1913 that proposed future residential and road layout for Saskatoon, and he originated the idea of the City developing an "Encircling Boulevard"; in 2013 this proposal came to fruition with the completion of the Circle Drive freeway project. Ironically, Yorath's document proposed the Encircling Boulevard cross through what would later be named Yorath Island; the final Circle Drive passes to the north of the island, which is undeveloped save for a set of power lines that cross the river at the northern tip of the island.

Within North America the Island is one of the farthest northern examples of a cottonwood forest. The island also support 23 different types of shrubs and a mixture of wildlife (including the Cooper's Hawk, coyotes, red foxes, river otter, porcupine, beaver and deer).

== See also ==
- List of islands of Saskatchewan
