= Pioneer Island (Nunavut) =

Island in Nunavut, Canada

- Location within Nunavut Location within Canada

Geography
- Location: Northern Canada
- Coordinates: 76°57′N 96°57′W
- Archipelago: Queen Elizabeth Islands; Arctic Archipelago
- Length: 6 km (3.7 mi)
- Width: 5.7 km (3.54 mi)

Administration
- Canada
- Territory: Nunavut

Demographics
- Population: Uninhabited

Pioneer Island is an island of the Arctic Archipelago, in the territory of Nunavut. It lies at the northern end of Penny Strait, between Devon Island (to the south-east) and Crescent Island (to the north-west).

== See also ==
- List of Arctic islands
