= McLean Island (Saskatchewan) =

Island in Saskatchewan, Canada

- Interactive map of McLean Island

Geography
- Location: Saskatchewan
- Coordinates: 50°57′N 109°50′W

Administration
- Canada
- Province: Saskatchewan

McLean Island is a small island in the South Saskatchewan River north of the Estuary ghost town in Saskatchewan, Canada. The island is just west of the Estuary Ferry.

== See also ==
- List of islands of Saskatchewan
