= Adams Island (Nunavut) =

Island in Canada

Native name: Tuujjuk
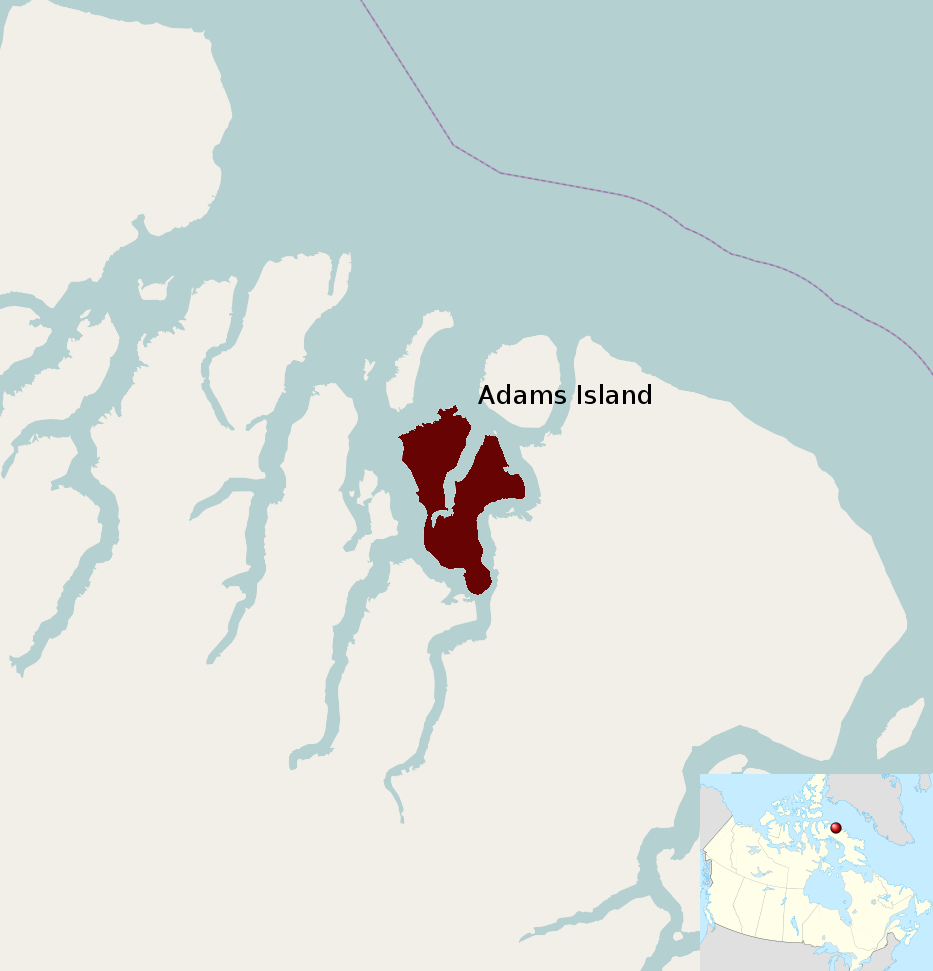

- Aerial view of Baffin Island and fjord

- Location within Nunavut Location within Canada

Geography
- Location: Baffin Bay
- Coordinates: 71°27′N 073°05′W
- Archipelago: Arctic Archipelago
- Area: 267 km^{2} (103 sq mi)
- Length: 30.5 km (18.95 mi)
- Width: 18–22 km (11–14 mi)
- Highest elevation: 800 m (2600 ft)

Administration
- Canada
- Territory: Nunavut
- Region: Qikiqtaaluk

Demographics
- Population: Uninhabited

Adams Island (Inuit: Tuujjuk) is an uninhabited island in the Qikiqtaaluk Region of Nunavut, Canada. The island is located in Baffin Bay off the northeastern coast of Baffin Island in the Arctic Archipelago. Nearby are Dexterity Island (northeast), Dexterity Fiord and Baffin Island (east), Tromso Fiord (south), Paterson Inlet (west), Bergesen Island (northwest), and Isbjorn Strait (north).

Adams Island is irregularly shaped, its eastern and western sides split by the Ratcliffe Arm. Coastlines slope sharply while the interior mountains are over 800 m (2,600 ft) in height. The island comprises an area of 267 km^{2} (103 sq mi), measuring 30.55 kilometres (18.98 mi) in length and 18 kilometres (11 mi) to 22 kilometres (14 mi) in width.

Another, much smaller, Adams Island is located off the northeastern tip of Baffin Island.
