= Barren Ground =

Barren Ground, Barren Grounds or Barren-ground may refer to:

- Barren Grounds, a Canadian term for tundra
- Barren Ground (novel), a 1925 novel by Ellen Glasgow
- "Barren Ground" (song), a 1990 song by Bruce Hornsby
- Barren ground shrew (Sorex ugyunak), a small shrew found in Canada and Alaska
- Barren Ground, Saint Helena, a settlement on Saint Helena, South Atlantic Ocean
- Barren-ground caribou (Rangifer tarandus groenlandicus), a subspecies of caribou found in Canada and Greenland
- Barren Grounds Nature Reserve, New South Wales, Australia
  - Barren Grounds Bird Observatory
- The Barren Grounds, a 2020 novel by David Roberston
