= Dexterity Island =

Uninhabited island in the Canadian Arctic

- Location within Nunavut Location within Canada

Geography
- Location: Baffin Bay
- Coordinates: 71°37′12″N 072°46′48″W
- Archipelago: Arctic Archipelago
- Area: 135 km^{2} (52 sq mi)

Administration
- Canada
- Territory: Nunavut
- Region: Qikiqtaaluk

Demographics
- Population: Uninhabited

Dexterity Island is an uninhabited island in the Qikiqtaaluk Region of Nunavut, Canada. It is located in Baffin Bay off the northeastern coast of Baffin Island. Adams Island is 19.3 km (12.0 mi) to the south, while Bergesen Island is 17.2 km (10.7 mi) to the west, across Isbjorn Strait.

== History ==
An Inuit settlement existed on Dexterity Island, but left before the arrival of the Hudson's Bay Company. The group camped on the landward side in the winter and the eastern side in the summer.
