= Meewasin Valley Authority =

Conservation organization in Saskatchewan, Canada

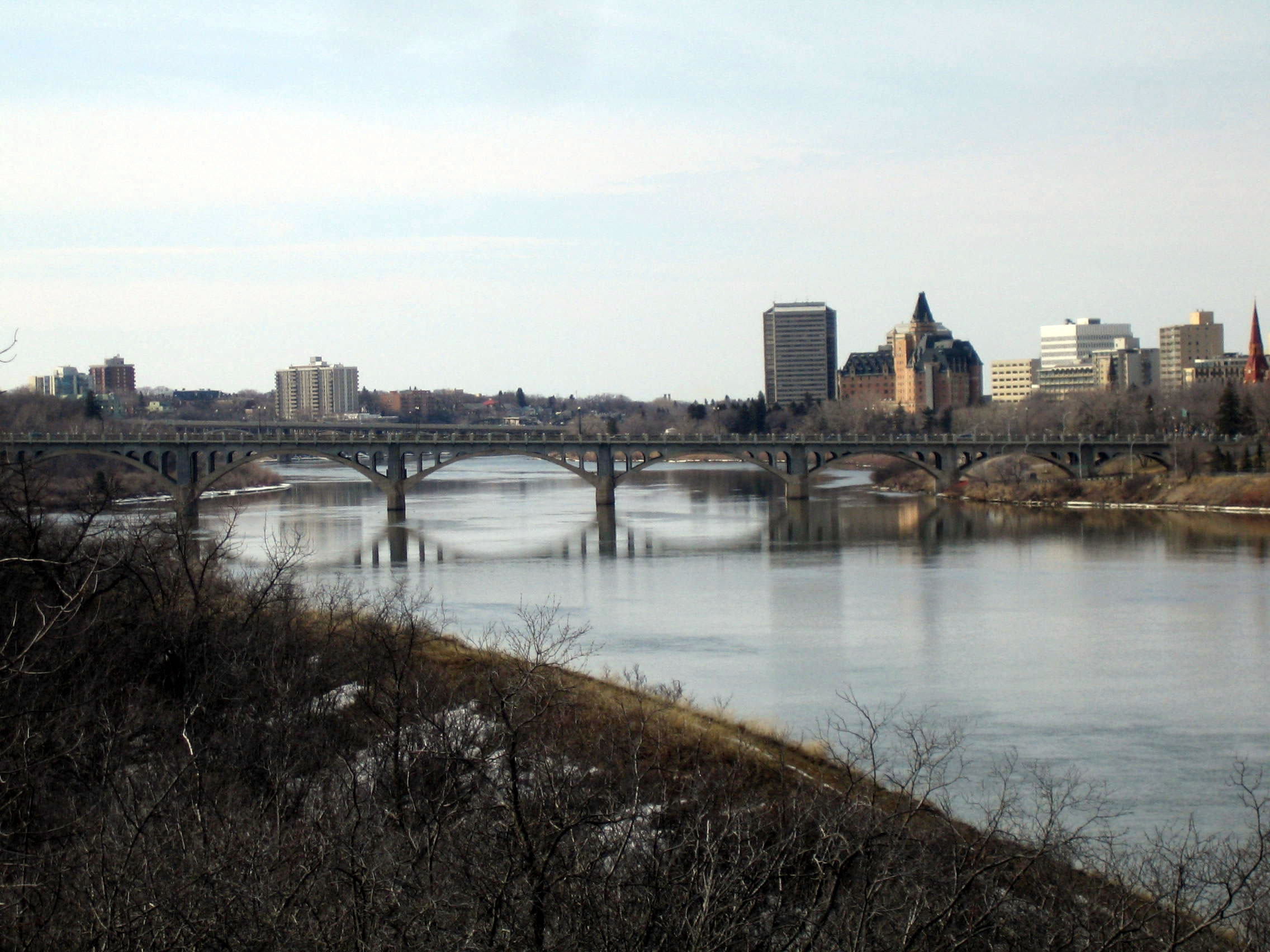
The University Bridge over the South Saskatchewan River at Saskatoon

The Meewasin Valley Authority is a conservation organization created in 1979 by the city of Saskatoon, the Government of Saskatchewan and the University of Saskatchewan and is dedicated to conserving the cultural and natural resources of the South Saskatchewan River Valley. The authority's activities include education, development and conservation. Centred in Saskatoon, the Conservation Zone of Meewasin runs 60 kilometres (37 mi) along the river valley from the eastern edge of the municipality of Corman Park through Saskatoon to the western edge of Corman Park (Pike Lake to Clarke’s Crossing). The authority is actively involved in the River Landing redevelopment.

It is made up of numerous conservation areas, canoe launches, interpretive centres (Meewasin Valley Centre, Beaver Creek Conservation Area and Saskatoon Natural Grasslands), Yorath Island, the university lands, a skating rink, and over 107 kilometres (66 mi) of Meewasin Valley Trail, 22.5 km (14.0 mi) of which are paved.

== Governance ==
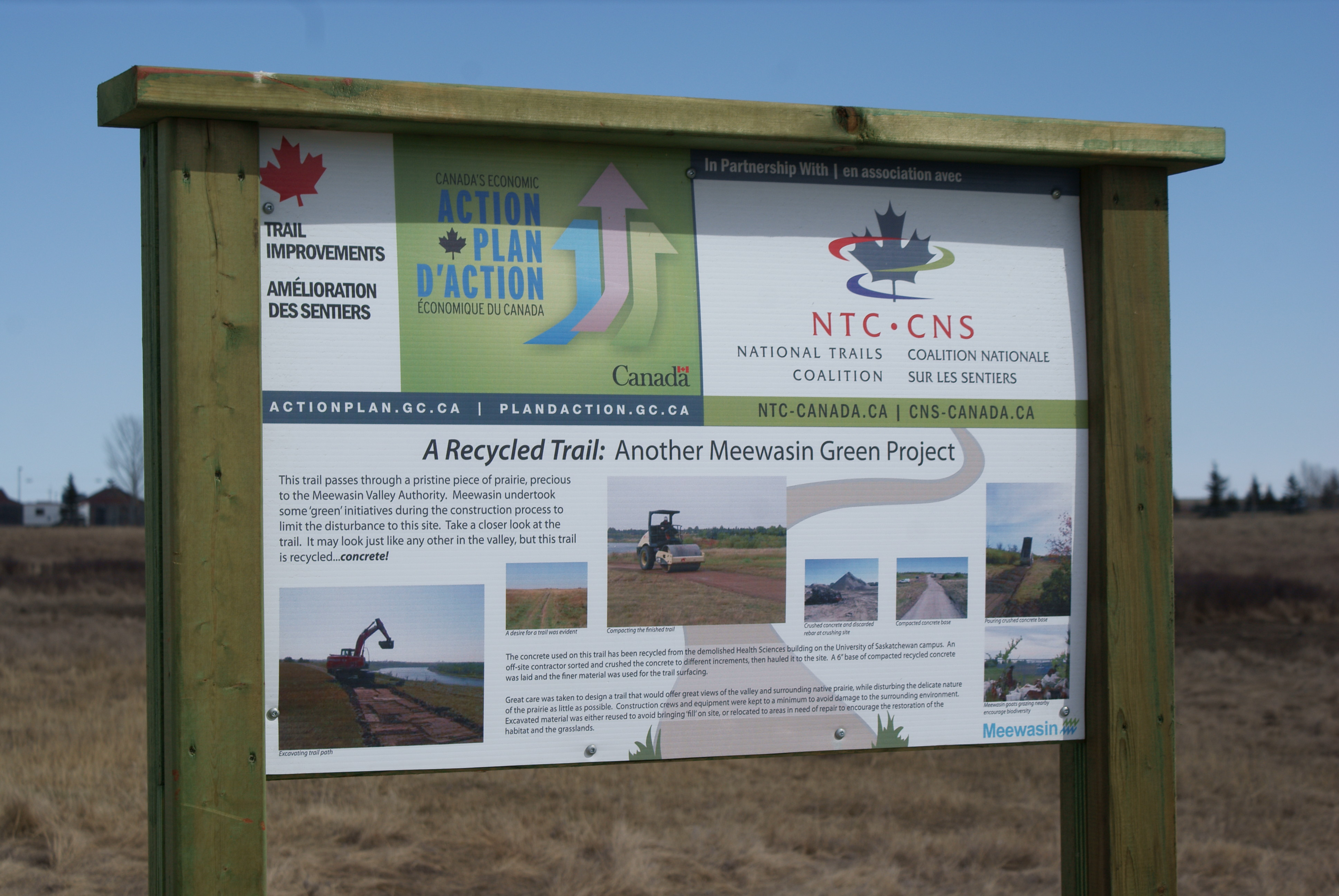
Peturrson's Ravine

Meewasin is governed by a 12 member board with four representatives each from the three participating parties: City of Saskatoon, Province of Saskatchewan, and University of Saskatchewan.

The Conservation Zone covers approximately 67 square kilometres (26 sq mi). Meewasin is the means by which the three participating parties (City of Saskatoon, Province of Saskatchewan and University of Saskatchewan) have chosen to manage their lands, through one common authority.

Meewasin has statutory authority to control development in the Conservation Zone along the river valley, and does so through public committees.

== Meewasin's mandates ==
Meewasin has three mandates that focus on conservation, development, and education.

- Conservation: Protection of natural and heritage resources in the valley is one of Meewasin's primary goals. The goal of the Resource Conservation Department is to protect, conserve and restore natural habitat that has been changed or altered. Projects include improving biodiversity in natural grasslands through sheep grazing; erosion control and re-vegetation of areas along the river bank; afforestation (greening the valley); working with steward groups to restore important natural sites throughout the valley; preservation of remaining natural areas in the valley, and enhancing, restoring and/or creating wildlife habitat areas.
- Development: The Meewasin Valley Trail follows the South Saskatchewan River through Saskatoon. Cross-country skiing takes place during the winter months, along with skating in Kiwanis Memorial Park. Access points are found throughout the city with interpretive signage and washrooms located along the route. In the winter the Meewasin Skating Rink is free to the public; it is located in Kiwanis Memorial Park beside the Delta Bessborough hotel. The rink has been open since 1980.
- Education: Meewasin offers a number of education programs that promote conservation of the natural and cultural heritage resources of the valley
  - Meewasin Valley Centre (Closed permanently in 2016): The Meewasin Valley Centre is about Saskatoon's history, the South Saskatchewan River, and the future of the Meewasin Valley through interactive displays. The Centre also provides tourist information and a gift shop. The MVC staff delivers a cultural history program to most grade 3 students in Saskatoon. The Centre partnered with other organizations to host such events as the annual Heritage Festival of Saskatoon, National Rivers Day, and Seasonal programs at the historic Marr Residence. The Meewasin Valley Center is located along the riverbank in Friendship Park.
  - Beaver Creek Conservation Area: Beaver Creek Conservation Area is located 13 km south of Saskatoon. A sheltered creek, river valley, and prairie habitat offer observation of flora and fauna for visitors. The area is a microcosm of the Meewasin Valley and contains one of the few uncultivated short grass prairie sites in Saskatchewan. Public programs are Moon Hikes, Perseid Meteor Showers, and Heritage Hoopla.

== Meewasin registered charity ==
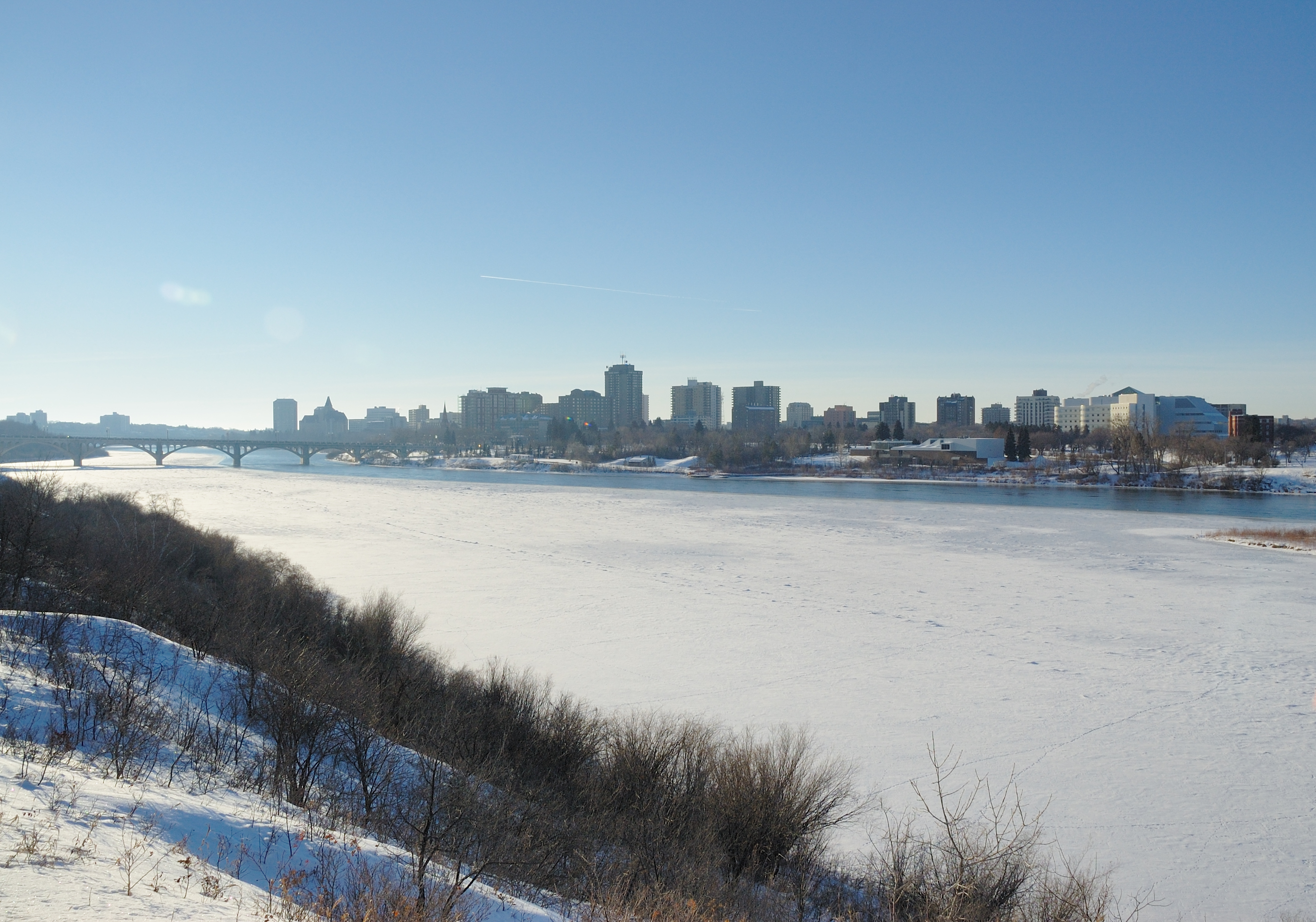
View on Saskatoon's Downtown from the Meewasin Trail during Winter

Meewasin is a registered charity. Approximately 54% of its budget for 2006–07 came from non-statutory sources to support conservation, development, and education initiatives.

The jurisdiction of the authority runs for approximately 60 km along the river from Pike Lake in the southwest to Clarke's Crossing in the northeast in the city of Saskatoon, the Rural Municipality of Corman Park No. 344, and the University of Saskatchewan.

== See also ==
- List of protected areas of Saskatchewan
