= Dover Island (Nova Scotia) =

Island off the shore of Nova Scotia, Canada

Coordinates: 44°28′59.9″N 63°51′57″W

Dover Island an island located 1.6 km (one mile) off the shore of West Dover, Nova Scotia. It is a popular destination for a form of free rock climbing known as bouldering. It is home to over 100 bouldering problems concentrated in a tiny area ranging from V0 to V10, with many new problems yet to be discovered. It is also a vacation spot, occasionally hosting weddings.

Dover Island in Nova Scotia

== Flora ==
Dover Island has 13 known rare and endangered species including one of the highest concentrations of the Slender Blue Flag Iris

== Transportation ==
Most locals traditionally arranged transportation to the island with a local fisherman/blacksmith named Norm, until his retirement in 2011. As of May 2012, boat service for climbers was provided by the proprietor of a local bed and breakfast, Ocean Spray B&B.

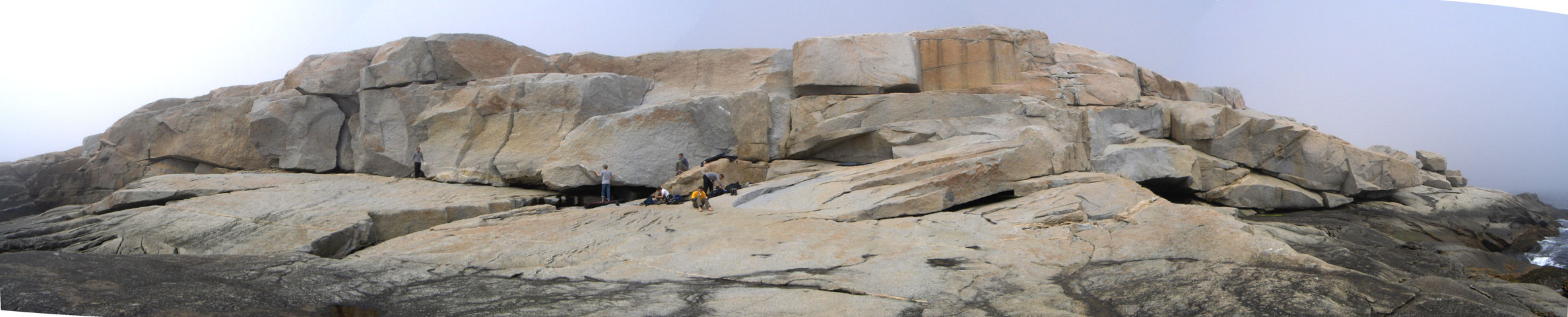
The Back Side of Dover Island

== Classic Bouldering Problems ==
- Orgasmatron (V0)
- The Coffin (V2)
- The Bear (V4)
- Orangutan (V4)
- John Doe (V4)
- The Wave (V5)
- Bulldog (V6)
- Orange Crush (V6)
- Behave (V7)
- Exciter (V7)
- I Heel Good (V7)
- One Scoop (V8)

washed out to sea.

- White Trash (V8)

== Events ==
Climb Nova Scotia hosts Boulderfest every year on Dover Island. Boulderfest is a popular event that usually sells out within the first day of ticket sales.

== Nova Scotia Climbing Related Links ==
Climb Nova Scotia
Halifax Bouldering
Climb Eastern Canada Webform
Pulldown Productions
Tracstarr Productions
Ground Zero Climbing Gym
