= Puffin Island (Baccalieu Tickle), Newfoundland and Labrador =

Island in Newfoundland and Labrador, Canada

Coordinates: 48°07′35″N 52°48′50″W

Puffin Island is a small island in Newfoundland and Labrador, Canada, in a navigation channel called Baccalieu Tickle and just off the coast of Baccalieu Island. The island is an ecological reserve for its population of Atlantic puffin. The island is inaccessible from the water and provides ideal protection for the breeding colonies of Atlantic puffin that makes Puffin Island their home.
