= Barren Island (Nova Scotia) =

Island in Nova Scotia, Canada

Barren
- Location within Nova Scotia

Geography
- Location: Atlantic Ocean
- Coordinates: 44.9410°N 62.0706°W
- Area: 758 acres (307 ha)

Barren Island is an island located in Nova Scotia, Canada.

== Fauna and flora ==
It has coastal bogs, coastal forests, and beaches.

It has osprey, willets, and common eider.
