= Boughton Island (Prince Edward Island) =

Island in Prince Edward Island, Canada

Coordinates: 46°11′30″N 62°24′55″W

Boughton Island (/ˈboʊtɒn/ BOH-ton) is a deserted island, located in Cardigan Bay central north-eastern Prince Edward Island. It is the province's third-largest island, with six kilometres of shoreline and an area of 240 hectares (600 acres). It is a popular destination for locals and tourists to visit for picnicking and hiking.

== History ==
Prior to World War II, Boughton Island was home to several families. It was covered in rich farmland and active lobster canneries. It also had a post office and schoolhouse.

== Wildlife ==
Because Boughton Island has been uninhabited for more than 60 years, wildlife has thrived here without development or human interference. It houses more than 49 species of birds, including osprey, great blue heron, common tern, bald eagles, merlins, gulls, swallows, loons, mergansers, scoters, and piping plovers. Red fox, shrew and beaver also live here. Boughton Island provides diverse habitats including white sand beaches, a spruce forest, a saltwater marsh, and several freshwater ponds.

== Ownership ==
Boughton Island had been mostly privately owned. Plans for a large subdivision had been approved. With the threat of development looming, in 2007, the Nature Conservancy of Canada (NCC) purchased just over half of the island. The NCC then transferred ownership of Boughton Island to the Government of Prince Edward Island. The Province now manages the entire island under the Natural Areas Protection Act but the NCC helps to protect it so it may continue to be the largest undisturbed island in Prince Edward Island.
