= South Saskatchewan River =

River in Western Canada

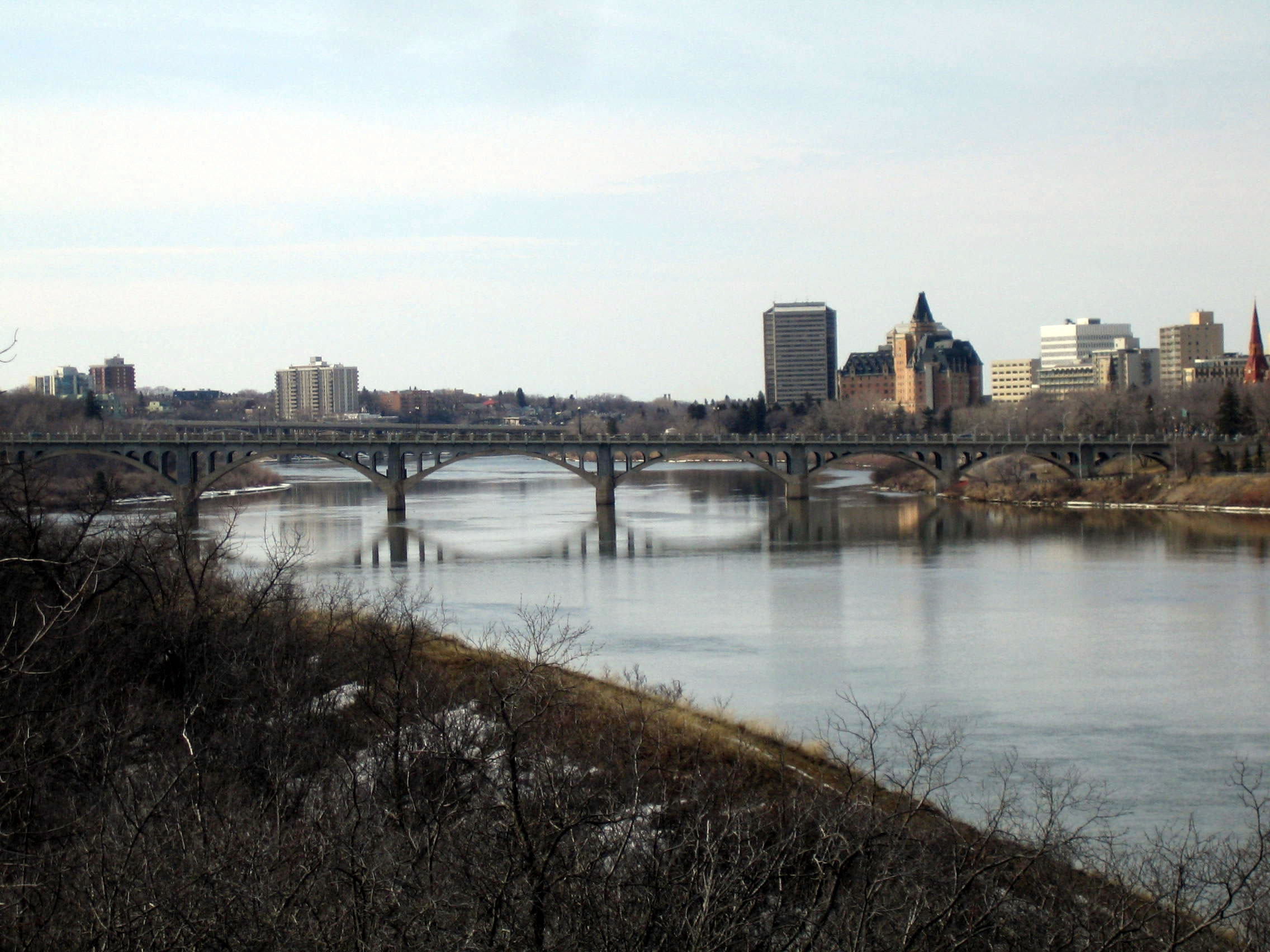
- The University Bridge over the South Saskatchewan River at Saskatoon

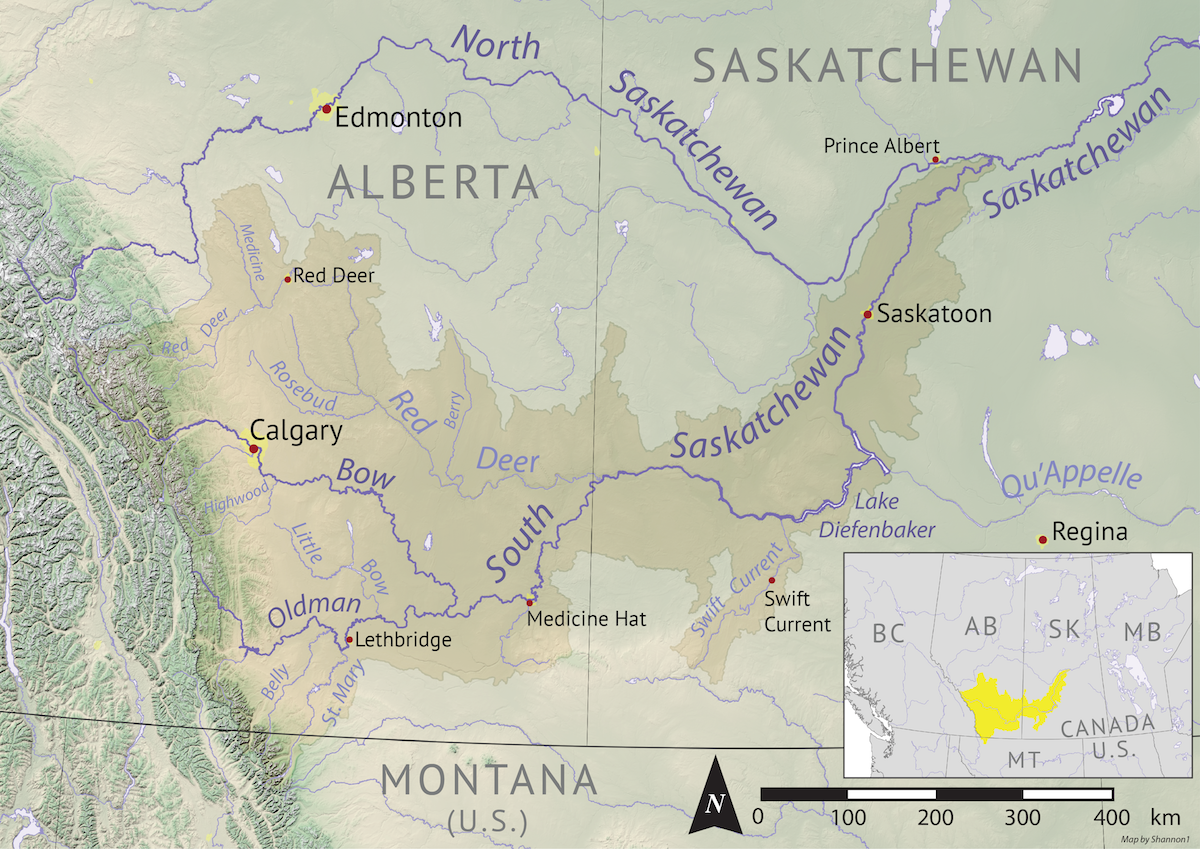
- The South Saskatchewan River drainage basin

- The mouth in Saskatchewan South Saskatchewan River (Canada)

Location
- Country: Canada
- Provinces: Alberta; Saskatchewan

Physical characteristics
- Source confluence: Oldman and Bow Rivers
  - location: Municipal District of Taber, Alberta
  - coordinates: 49°56′00″N 111°41′30″W
  - elevation: 700 m (2,300 ft)
- Mouth: Saskatchewan River
  - location: Saskatchewan River Forks, Saskatchewan
  - coordinates: 53°14′6″N 105°4′58″W
  - elevation: 380 m (1,250 ft)
- Length: 1,392 km (865 mi)
- Basin size: 146,100 km^{2} (56,400 sq mi)
- Discharge
  - location: Saskatoon, SK
  - average: 249 m^{3}/s (8,800 cu ft/s)

Basin features
- Progression: Saskatchewan River → Lake Winnipeg → Nelson River → Hudson Bay
- River system: Nelson River
- Tributaries
  - left: Bow River; Red Deer River
  - right: Oldman River

The South Saskatchewan River is a major river in the Canadian provinces of Alberta and Saskatchewan. The river begins at the confluence of the Bow and Oldman Rivers in southern Alberta and ends at the Saskatchewan River Forks in central Saskatchewan. The Saskatchewan River Forks is the confluence of the South and North Saskatchewan Rivers and is the beginning of the Saskatchewan River.

For the first half of the 20th century, the South Saskatchewan would completely freeze over during winter, creating spectacular ice breaks and dangerous conditions in Saskatoon, Medicine Hat, and elsewhere. At least one bridge in Saskatoon was destroyed by ice carried by the river. The construction of the Gardiner Dam in the 1960s, however, lessened the power of the river by diverting a substantial portion of the South Saskatchewan's natural flow into the Qu'Appelle River. By the 1980s many permanent sandbars had formed due to the lowering of the level of the river.

From the headwaters of the Bow River, the South Saskatchewan flows for 1,392 kilometres (865 mi). At its mouth at Saskatchewan River Forks, it has an average discharge of 280 cubic metres per second (9,900 cu ft/s) and has a watershed of 146,100 square kilometres (56,400 sq mi), 1,800 of which are in Montana in the United States and 144,300 square kilometres (55,700 sq mi) in Alberta and Saskatchewan.

== Course ==
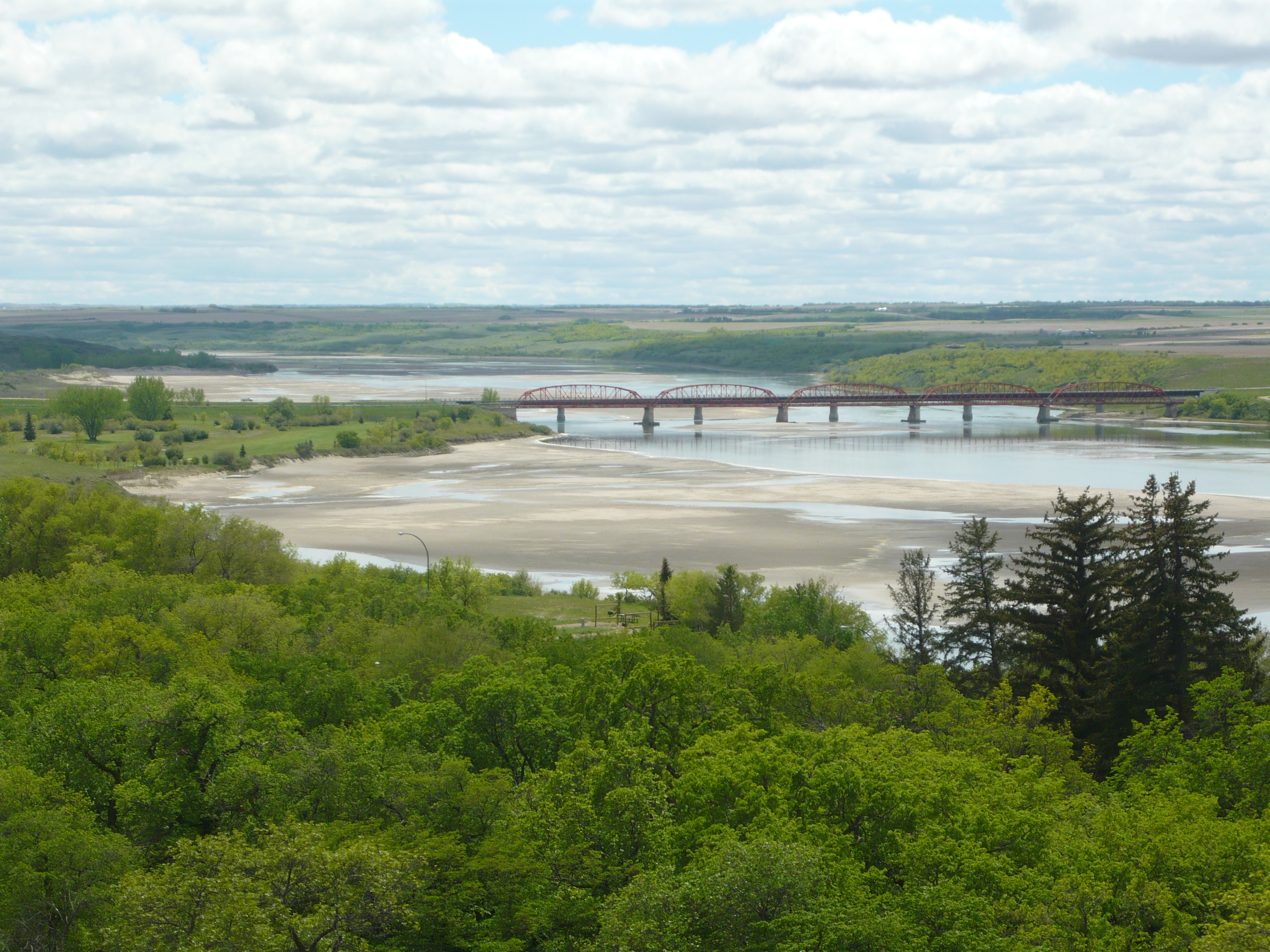
Highway 15 bridge near Outlook, Saskatchewan.

The river originates at the confluence of the Bow and Oldman Rivers, north of Grassy Lake, Alberta at the incorporated community of Bow Island, not to be confused with the town of Bow Island, Alberta. The waters of these two rivers, in turn, originate from winter snowpack and rainfall in the Rocky Mountains near the British Columbia and Montana border. Glacier and snowmelt from the Rocky Mountains and foothills contributes nearly 90% of the annual flow, with most of that contribution during July and August. The Red Deer River is a major tributary of the South Saskatchewan merging 16 kilometres (10 mi) east of the Alberta-Saskatchewan border. The Lake Diefenbaker reservoir was created with the construction of the Gardiner and Qu'Appelle River dams in Saskatchewan. Water from the South Saskatchewan flowing through the dams provides approximately 19 percent of the hydro-electricity generated by SaskPower.

Downstream from the dam the river flows north through Saskatoon and joins the North Saskatchewan River east of Prince Albert at the Saskatchewan River Forks — thus forming the Saskatchewan River. For approximately 60 kilometres (37 mi) near Saskatoon, the Meewasin Valley Authority is responsible for conservation of the river environment. Numerous lakes in the Saskatoon area were formed by oxbows of the South Saskatchewan River, most notably Moon Lake and Pike Lake.

A 2009 report, produced by WWF-Canada which analysed the river flow on ten major Canadian rivers reported that the South Saskatchewan River was the most at risk. Climate change, agricultural and urban infrastructure water use, and dams producing hydroelectricity, have all combined to reduce the flow of the South Saskatchewan River by 70 percent. Developers and governments have been cautioned to protect and restore the river with sustainable projects and limit water diversion. Dickson Dam regulates water supply downstream on the Red Deer River; the Bassano Dam and 11 other dams divert water on the Bow River and in the Bow River basin; and the Oldman River Dam and Waterton-St. Mary Headworks System manage water flow downstream of the Oldman River. The proposed Meridian dam 30 kilometres (19 mi) west of Leader and 95 kilometres (59 mi) north east of Medicine Hat was cancelled due to project costs outweighing the irrigation benefits.

== Tributaries ==
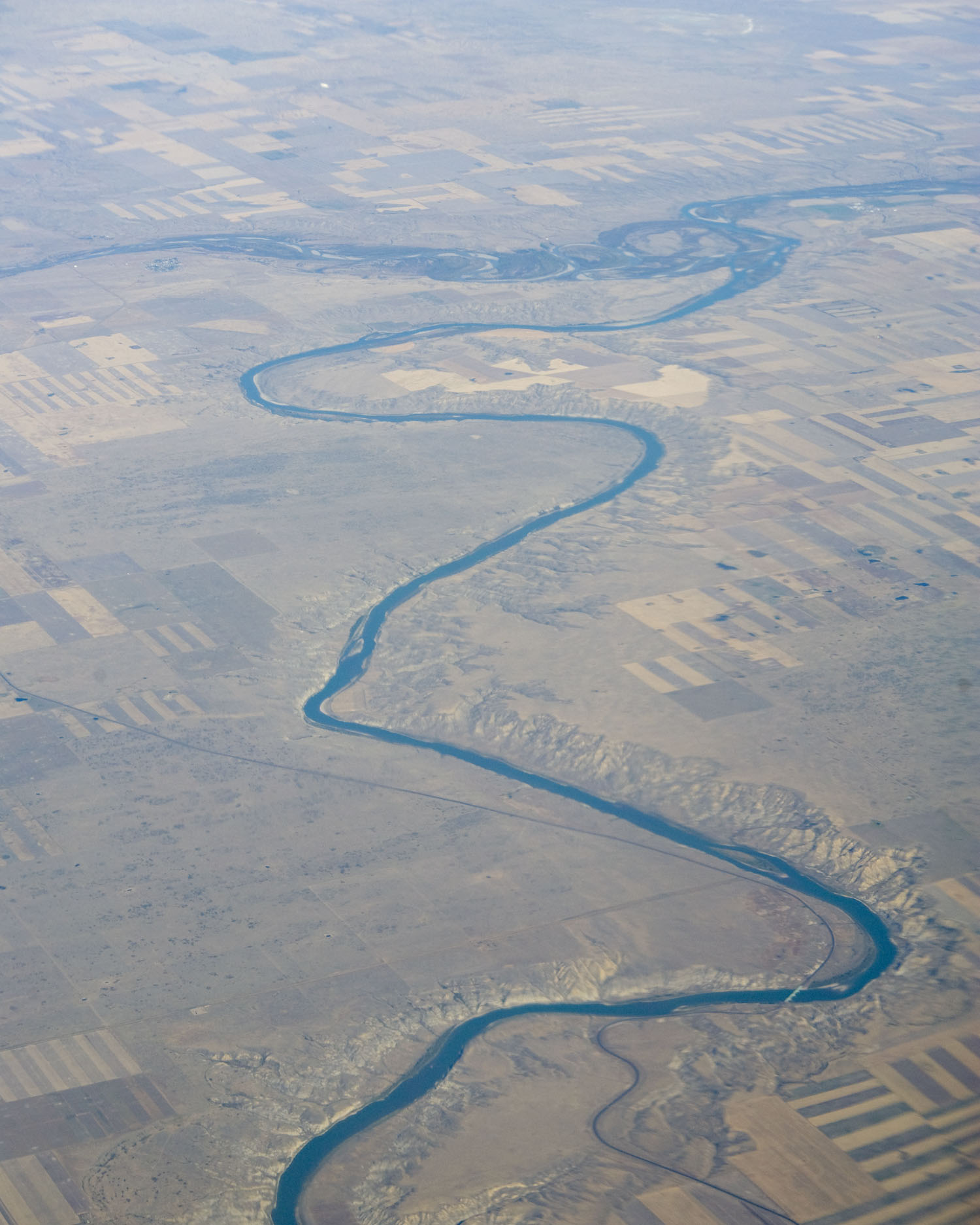
The South Saskatchewan River at Empress, AB where it receives the Red Deer River

The following are the tributaries of the South Saskatchewan River from its source to its mouth:

- Bow River
- Oldman River
- Seven Persons Creek
  - Ross Creek
- Mitchell Creek
- Red Deer River
- Alkali Creek
- Swift Current Creek (flows into Lake Diefenbaker)
- Brightwater Creek
- Opimihaw Creek
- Fish Creek
- McKay Creek
- McFarlane Creek
- Cromarty Creek
- Red Deer Creek

== Islands ==
The following is a list of named islands in the South Saskatchewan River from its source to its mouth:

- Bow Island
- Galt Island
- Ebenau Island
- Allan Island
- McLean Island
- Kennedy Islands
- MacPherson Island
- Young Island
- Wilson Island
- Yorath Island
- Sugar Island
- Traill Island
- Campbell Island
- Crossing Island

== Geology ==
Sections of the riverbank along the South Saskatchewan River are prone to slumping. Since its founding, the city of Saskatoon has dealt with a number of slope failures. Controlling riverbank development was a factor in establishing the Meewasin Valley Authority in 1979.

== Important Bird Areas of Canada ==
There are four Important Bird Areas (IBA) of Canada along the South Saskatchewan River. Two – Galloway and Miry Bay (SK006) and East Lake Diefenbaker (SK055) – are located at Lake Diefenbaker and the other two are farther upstream along the river's course.

Suffield (AB 007) (50.4651°N 110.5331°W) is in Alberta on the Canadian Forces Base Suffield. Covering an area of 460.71 km^{2} (177.88 sq mi), the IBA consists of two sections on the base along the north-western shore of the South Saskatchewan River. The landscape consists of mixed grasslands with intermittent salt lakes and natural springs. Birds found at the site include the burrowing owl, loggerhead shrike, long-billed curlew, ferruginous hawk, McCown's longspur, Brewer's sparrow, upland sandpiper, Baird's sparrow, Sprague's pipit, grasshopper sparrow, western meadowlark, golden eagle, and the prairie falcon. Besides the aforementioned birds, the habitat is also important for several animals, including the mule deer, pronghone antelope, Ord's kangaroo rat, pygmy short-horned lizard, western hognosed snake, and the prairie rattlesnake.

The South Saskatchewan River (Empress to Lancer Ferry) (SK 046) IBA (50.9359°N 109.8682°W) is in Saskatchewan and follows the course of the South Saskatchewan River from the Alberta / Saskatchewan border east to the Lancer Ferry crossing and includes the river's valley and the fork with the Red Deer River. The site covers an area of 208.6 km (129.6 mi). The valley floor is heavily wooded and includes trees such as the eastern cottonwood, Manitoba maple, peach-leaved willow, and the green ash. Birds found at the site include the long-billed curlew, piping plover, loggerhead shrike, short-eared owl, ferruginous hawk, red-headed woodpecker, prairie falcon, turkey vulture, golden eagle, great horned owl, western screech owl, pileated woodpecker, western wood pewee, rock wren, alder flycatcher, yellow-breasted chat, and the great blue heron.

== Fish species ==
Fish species include walleye, sauger, yellow perch, northern pike, lake trout, rainbow trout, goldeye, lake whitefish, cisco, lake sturgeon, burbot, quillback, longnose sucker, white sucker, and shorthead redhorse.

== See also ==
- List of crossings of the South Saskatchewan River
- List of longest rivers of Canada
- List of rivers of Alberta
- List of rivers of Saskatchewan
