= Ivujivik =

Ivujivik ᐃᕗᔨᕕᒃ
- Northern village municipality
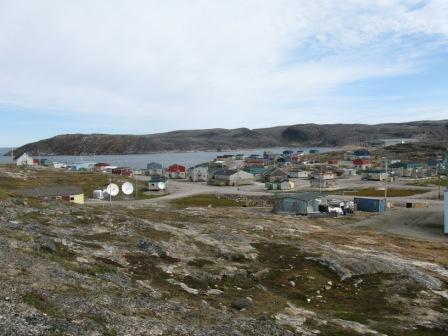

- Location within Quebec
- Coordinates: 62°25′00″N 77°54′30″W
- Country: Canada
- Province: Quebec
- Region: Nord-du-Québec
- TE: Kativik
- Settled: 1938 (mission)
- Constituted: June 27, 1981

Government
  - Mayor: Adamie Kalingo
  - Federal riding: Abitibi—Baie-James—Nunavik—Eeyou
  - Prov. riding: Ungava

Area
  - Total: 36.98 km^{2} (14.28 sq mi)
  - Land: 35.15 km^{2} (13.57 sq mi)

Population (2021)
  - Total: 412
  - Density: 11.7/km^{2} (30/sq mi)
  - Change (2016–21): ▼0.5%
  - Dwellings: 136
- Time zone: UTC−5 (EST)
  - Summer (DST): UTC−4 (EDT)
- Postal code(s): J0M 1H0
- Area code: 819
- Website: www.nvivujivik.ca

Ivujivik (Inuktitut: ᐃᕗᔨᕕᒃ Inuktitut pronunciation: [ivujivik], meaning "Place where ice accumulates because of strong currents", or "Sea-ice crash Area") is a northern village (Inuit community) in Nunavik, Quebec, and the northernmost settlement in any Canadian province, although there are settlements further north in the territories. Its population in the 2021 Canadian census was 412.

Policing for Ivujivik is provided by the Nunavik Police Service.

== Geography ==
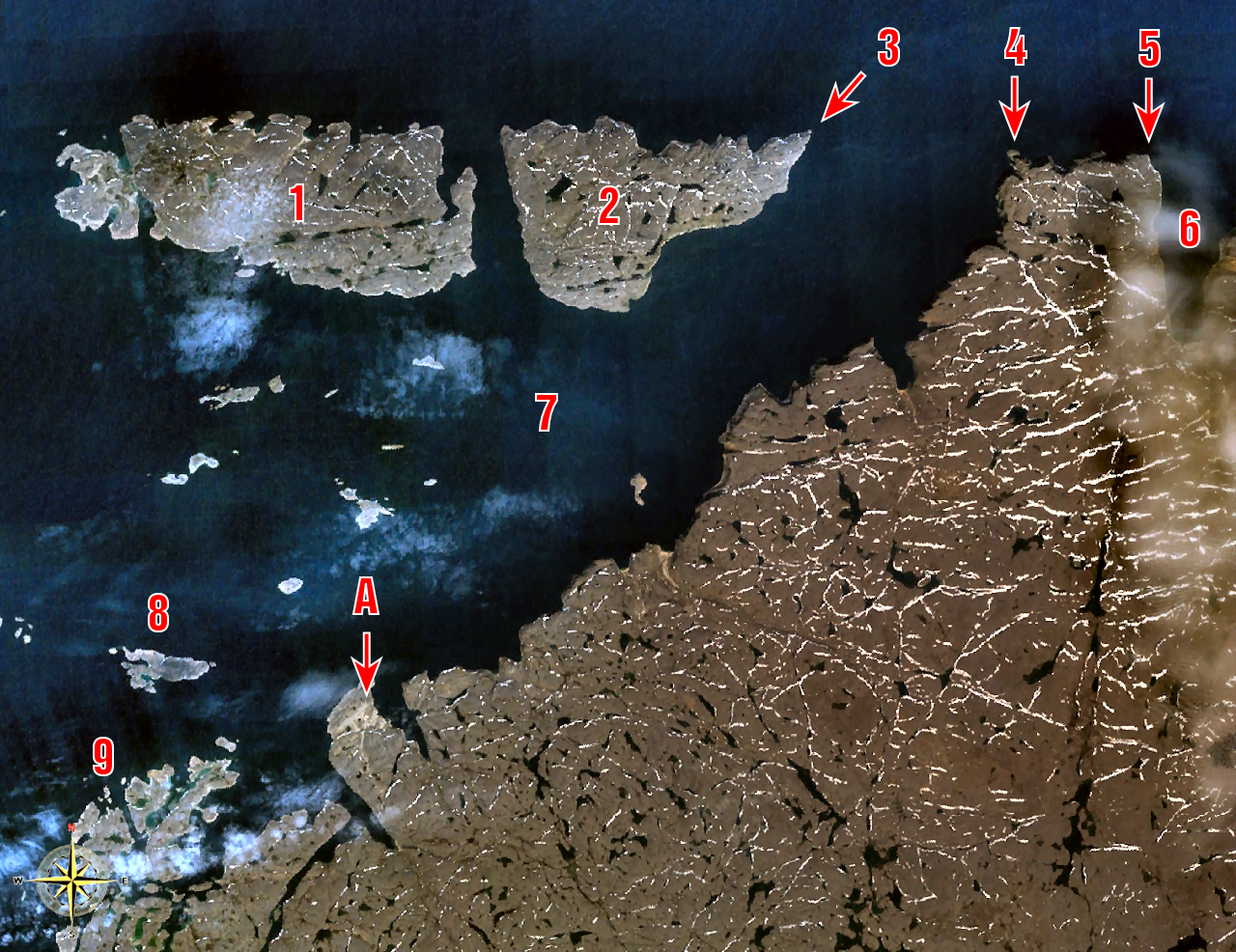
Satellite image of Digges Sound with Ivujivik marked "A" (click image for full legend)

Ivujivik is located in the Nunavik region of the province, some 2,000 km (1,200 mi) north of Montreal. It is only 28 km (17 mi) south-west from Cape Wolstenholme, the northernmost tip of the Ungava Peninsula, which is in turn the northernmost part of the Labrador Peninsula. It is near Digges Sound, where Hudson Strait meets Hudson Bay. The municipal boundaries include an area of 35.21 km^{2} (13.59 sq mi).

The area is ice-free for 20 working days a year in the summer. There are no road links to the North American road system, nor is this (or any other) Nunavik community linked by road to any of the other villages in the region. The village is served by Ivujivik Airport.

The village itself is located on a small sandy cove between imposing cliffs that drop steeply into Digges Sound. Here the strong currents from Hudson Bay and the Hudson Strait clash, sometimes even crushing trapped animals between the ice floes. Directly north across the sound are West and East Digges Islands. Farther north in the Hudson Strait are Nottingham and Salisbury Islands.

== History ==
Archaeological dating estimates nearly 3000 years since the arrival in the area of Thule People, ancestors of today's Inuit, from Baffin Island. This place would have been the starting point of Inuit migration into Quebec, explaining the presence of the Inuit along the coast of Hudson Bay. On nearby Digges Island was the spot of the first encounter between Europeans and the Inuit of Nunavik. This occurred in 1610 on Henry Hudson's last mission.

The Hudson's Bay Company established a trading post on Erik Cove near Cape Wolstenholme in 1909. A Catholic mission was established on the village's current site in 1938. But both locations only remained seasonal camps. In 1947, the HBC post at Erik Cove closed and a new outpost was set up in Ivujivik. This marked the beginning of the modern village as nomadic Inuit finally began to settle permanently. Not until the 1960s did the Government of Canada begin to deliver health and social services. In 1962, the Inuit established a cooperative that has allowed the community to better structure its local economy and develop new activities such as sculpture, crafts, and tourism focusing on hunting and fishing.

Ivujivik, along with Puvirnituq, was one of two Inuit villages that refused to sign the 1975 James Bay and Northern Quebec Agreement. In protest, it formed the Inuuqatigiit Tunngavingat Nunamini (ITN) movement. Nonetheless, it was gradually represented by the Kativik Regional Government, and it officially joined the agreement in 2015.

=== 2006 bear attack ===
In February 2006, the Ivujivik resident Lydia Angiyou saved her seven-year-old son and two of his friends from a polar bear attack outside the local youth centre by placing herself between the bear and the children. A local hunter, Sirqualuk Ainalik, heard the noise, ran over, and saved her by shooting the bear as it attacked. It is thought that she may have benefited from a phenomenon known as hysterical strength in fighting with the bear. The presence of a polar bear in a populated area is an unusual occurrence. Angiyou was awarded the Medal of Bravery by the Governor General for her actions.

== Demographics ==
In the 2021 Census of Population conducted by Statistics Canada, Ivujivik had a population of 412 living in 123 of its 136 total private dwellings, a change of −0.5% from its 2016 population of 414. With a land area of 35.15 km^{2} (13.57 sq mi), it had a population density of 11.7/km^{2} (30.4/sq mi) in 2021.

In 2001, 285 of the 298 (about 96%) persons were considered aboriginal. As with many Inuit villages, there is a large youth contingent. In 2006, 42.9% of the population was below the age of fifteen. The median age was 19.1.

In 2001, unemployment was at 18.2 percent. The median income for the same census was $14,624 (in Canadian dollars.) 72 percent of the workforce walked or biked to work.

Historical census populations – Ivujivik

Year	Pop.	±%
1986	208	—
1991	263	+26.4%
1996	274	+4.2%
2001	298	+8.8%

Year	Pop.	±%
2006	349	+17.1%
2011	370	+6.0%
2016	414	+11.9%
2021	412	−0.5%

Source: Statistics Canada

== Education ==
The Kativik School Board operates the Nuvviti School.

In 1980 there was a community boycott against the Kativik School Board as people in the community disliked the James Bay Agreement and therefore shunned the school district as they perceived it as close to the people who accepted the agreement. That year, the government of Quebec planned to open its own school there.
