= Tweedsmuir (disambiguation) =

Tweedsmuir may refer to:

== People ==
- Baron Tweedsmuir
- John Buchan, 1st Baron Tweedsmuir (1875–1940)
- John Norman Stuart Buchan, 2nd Baron Tweedsmuir (1911–1996)
- William de l'Aigle Buchan, 3rd Baron Tweedsmuir (1916–2008)
- John William de l'Aigle Buchan, 4th Baron Tweedsmuir (b. 1950--son of 3rd Baron)
- Priscilla Buchan, Baroness Tweedsmuir
- Susan Buchan, Baroness Tweedsmuir

== Places ==
- Tweedsmuir, Scotland
- North Tweedsmuir Island, Nunavut, Canada
- South Tweedsmuir Island, Nunavut, Canada
- Tweedsmuir North Provincial Park and Protected Area, British Columbia, Canada
- Tweedsmuir South Provincial Park, British Columbia, Canada

== Schools ==
- Lord Tweedsmuir Elementary School, British Columbia, Canada
- Lord Tweedsmuir Secondary School, British Columbia, Canada
- Strathcona-Tweedsmuir School, Alberta, Canada
