= South Tweedsmuir Island =

Island in Nunavut, Canada

- Location within Nunavut Location within Canada

Geography
- Location: Foxe Basin
- Coordinates: 68°23′N 74°15′W
- Archipelago: Arctic Archipelago

Administration
- Canada
- Territory: Nunavut
- Region: Qikiqtaaluk

Demographics
- Population: Uninhabited
- Source: South Tweedsmuir Island at Atlas of Canada

South Tweedsmuir Island is one of the Canadian arctic islands located in Foxe Basin, off the southwest coast of Baffin Island, in the Qikiqtaaluk Region of Nunavut, Canada. Foley Island is to the north, North Tweedsmuir Island is to the northwest, Prince Charles Island is to the west, and Air Force Island is to the south.

South Tweedsmuir Island is uninhabited and its temperatures are extremely cold. It measures 158 km^{2} (61 sq mi) in area.

The island is named after John Buchan, 1st Baron Tweedsmuir who served as Governor General of Canada.
