= List of inhabited islands by area =

Wikimedia list article

List of inhabited islands over 250 km^{2}.

| Country | Island | Area | Pop | Year | Density |
|---|---|---|---|---|---|
| Denmark | Greenland | 2,108,459 | 41,692 | 2026 | |
| | New Guinea | | | | |
| Papua New Guinea | New Guinea | | | 2024 | |
| Madagascar | Madagascar | 587,041 | 27,044,435 | 2020 | |
| Canada | Baffin | 507,205 | 12,095 | 2021 | |
| Canada | Victoria | 219,191 | 2,168 | 2021 | |
| United Kingdom | Great Britain | 209,331 | 66,623,654 | 2021 | |
| Canada | Ellesmere | 197,790 | 144 | 2021 | |
| New Zealand | South Island | 150,437 | 1,184,694 | 2023 | |
| New Zealand | North Island | 113,729 | 3,797,496 | 2023 | |
| Canada | Newfoundland | 108,878 | 471,414 | 2021 | |
| Cuba | Cuba | 104,556 | 11,003,527 | 2012 | |
| Iceland | Iceland | 101,826 | 389,759 | 2026 | |
| Ireland | Ireland | 84,079 | 7,028,295 | 2022 | |
| United Kingdom | Ireland | 84,079 | 7,028,295 | 2021 | |
| Haiti | Hispaniola | 76,192 | 21,539,227 | 2015 | |
| Dominican Republic | Hispaniola | 76,192 | 21,539,227 | 2022 | |
| Russia | Sakhalin | 72,492 | 445,878 | 2021 | |
| Canada | Banks | 70,191 | 104 | 2021 | |
| Argentina | Tierra del Fuego | 47,992 | 194,041 | 2022 | |
| Chile | Tierra del Fuego | 47,992 | 194,041 | 2017 | |
| Canada | Southampton | 43,069 | 1,035 | 2021 | |
| Brazil | Marajó | 40,100 | 369,573 | 2022 | |
| Norway | Spitsbergen | 37,673 | 2,904 | 2026 | |
| Papua New Guinea | New Britain | 35,144 | | | |
| Russia | Yuzhny | 33,275 | 2,302 | 2021 | |
| Canada | Vancouver | 31,815 | 806,777 | 2021 | |
| Italy | Sicily | 25,426 | 4,740,353 | 2026 | |
| Italy | Sardinia | 23,813 | 1,525,010 | 2026 | |
| France | Grande Terre | 16,648 | 243,189 | 2025 | |
| Canada | King William | 13,111 | 1,349 | 2021 | |
| Jamaica | Jamaica | 10,991 | 2,774,538 | 2022 | |
| Canada | Cape Breton | 10,514 | 126,145 | 2021 | |
| United States | Hawaii | 10,432 | 200,629 | 2020 | |
| Fiji | Viti Levu | 10,388 | 704,904 | 2017 | |
| United States | Kodiak | 9,293 | 12,894 | 2020 | |
| United States | Puerto Rico | 8,868 | 3,269,449 | 2020 | |
| France | Corsica | 8,681 | 355,486 | 2023 | |
| Denmark | Disko | 8,578 | 806 | 2026 | |
| Chile | Chiloé | 8,394 | 148,173 | 2017 | |
| Greece | Crete | 8,312 | 624,268 | 2021 | |
| Canada | Anticosti | 7,953 | 177 | 2021 | |
| Denmark | Zealand | 7,031 | 2,428,751 | 2026 | |
| Canada | Cornwallis | 6,995 | 183 | 2021 | |
| United States | Prince of Wales | 6,675 | 3,439 | 2020 | |
| United Kingdom | East Falkland | 6,605 | 2,829 | 2016 | |
| Canada | Graham | 6,552 | 3,964 | 2021 | |
| Canada | Prince Edward Island | 5,741 | 154,023 | 2021 | |
| Fiji | Vanua Levu | 5,583 | 113,980 | 2017 | |
| Chile | Wellington | 5,556 | 100 | 2017 | |
| Solomon Islands | Guadalcanal | 5,353 | 157,818 | 2009 | |
| United States | Chichagof | 5,306 | 1,239 | 2020 | |
| United States | St. Lawrence | 5,135 | 1,475 | 2020 | |
| Chile | Riesco | 5,110 | 296 | 2017 | |
| Brazil | Grande de Gurupá | 4,864 | 9,587 | 2022 | |
| Trinidad and Tobago | Trinidad | 4,768 | 1,267,095 | 2011 | |
| Denmark | North Jutlandic | 4,685 | 294,769 | 2026 | |
| Ecuador | Isabela | 4,640 | 3,050 | 2022 | |
| United Kingdom | West Falkland | 4,532 | 160 | 2016 | |
| United States | Admiralty | 4,264 | 396 | 2020 | |
| United States | Nunivak | 4,209 | 206 | 2020 | |
| United States | Baranof | 4,162 | 8,075 | 2020 | |
| United States | Unimak | 4,119 | 394 | 2020 | |
| Chile | Hoste | 4,117 | 13 | 2017 | |
| Vanuatu | Espiritu Santo | 3,956 | 46,249 | 2016 | |
| Solomon Islands | Malaita | 3,836 | 117,422 | 2009 | |
| Yemen | Socotra | 3,796 | 43,413 | 2004 | |
| Greece | Euboea | 3,684 | 190,437 | 2021 | |
| Solomon Islands | Santa Isabel | 3,665 | 26,158 | 2009 | |
| Spain | Mallorca | 3,640 | 971,068 | 2025 | |
| United States | Long Island | 3,629 | 8,003,173 | 2020 | |
| Russia | Kolguyev | 3,497 | 337 | 2021 | |
| Bahamas | North Andros | 3,439 | 5,133 | 2010 | |
| Russia | Vaygach | 3,383 | 79 | 2021 | |
| Solomon Islands | Makira | 3,190 | 33,529 | 2009 | |
| Russia | Iturup | 3,139 | 6,874 | 2021 | |
| Sweden | Gotland | 2,994 | 60,367 | 2025 | |
| Brazil | Caviana | 2,944 | 2,790 | 2022 | |
| Denmark | Funen | 2,985 | 481,807 | 2026 | |
| Solomon Islands | Choiseul | 2,970 | 23,926 | 2009 | |
| Canada | Moresby | 2,929 | 325 | 2021 | |
| United States | Kupreanof | 2,803 | 624 | 2020 | |
| Canada | Manitoulin | 2,766 | 13,652 | 2021 | |
| United States | Revillagigedo | 2,755 | 13,810 | 2020 | |
| United States | Unalaska | 2,722 | 2,504 | 2020 | |
| Estonia | Saaremaa | 2,673 | 29,499 | 2021 | |
| France | Réunion | 2,512 | 889,679 | 2023 | |
| Chile | Navarino | 2,473 | 2,015 | 2017 | |
| Cuba | Isla de la Juventud | 2,237 | 84,751 | 2012 | |
| Norway | Hinnøya | 2,205 | 33,142 | 2026 | |
| United States | Nelson Island | 2,183 | 1,474 | 2020 | |
| United Kingdom | Lewis and Harris | 2,179 | 19,680 | 2022 | |
| Russia | Ayon | 2,156 | 210 | 2021 | |
| Russia | Paramushir | 2,053 | 2,374 | 2021 | |
| Vanuatu | Malekula | 2,041 | 26,401 | 2016 | |
| Solomon Islands | New Georgia | 2,037 | 16,329 | 2009 | |
| Spain | Tenerife | 2,034 | 966,469 | 2025 | |
| Chile | Magdalena | 2,025 | 79 | 2017 | |
| Equatorial Guinea | Bioko | 2,017 | 335,048 | 2015 | |
| Papua New Guinea | Manus | 1,940 | | | |
| United States | Kuiu | 1,936 | 2 | 2020 | |
| United States | Maui | 1,883 | 154,100 | 2020 | |
| Mauritius | Mauritius | 1,865 | 1,189,493 | 2022 | |
| Canada | Flaherty | 1,861 | 1,010 | 2021 | |
| United States | Afognak | 1,809 | 18 | 2020 | |
| United States | Umnak | 1,793 | 39 | 2020 | |
| Samoa | Savaiʻi | 1,694 | 46,587 | 2021 | |
| New Zealand | Stewart | 1,680 | 486 | 2023 | |
| Russia | Bering | 1,667 | 654 | 2021 | |
| Tanzania | Unguja | 1,666 | 1,334,377 | 2022 | |
| Spain | Fuerteventura | 1,659 | 129,080 | 2025 | |
| United Kingdom | Skye | 1,656 | 10,496 | 2022 | |
| Greece | Lesbos | 1,633 | 83,752 | 2021 | |
| Bahamas | Great Inagua | 1,615 | 913 | 2010 | |
| Norway | Senja | 1,586 | 7,495 | 2026 | |
| Spain | Gran Canaria | 1,560 | 875,589 | 2025 | |
| United States | Oahu | 1,545 | 1,015,004 | 2020 | |
| Brazil | Mexiana | 1,534 | 250 | 2022 | |
| Russia | Kunashir | 1,490 | 7,683 | 2021 | |
| Bahamas | South Andros | 1,448 | 1,465 | 2010 | |
| United States | Kauai | 1,430 | 73,216 | 2020 | |
| Brazil | São Luís | 1,412 | 1,533,006 | 2022 | |
| Greece | Rhodes | 1,401 | 125,112 | 2021 | |
| Sweden | Öland | 1,342 | 26,932 | 2025 | |
| Chile | Dawson | 1,290 | 217 | 2017 | |
| Denmark | Lolland | 1,243 | 55,830 | 2026 | |
| Mexico | Tiburón | 1,201 | 16 | 2020 | |
| Comoros | Grande Comore | 1,147 | 379,367 | 2017 | |
| France | Lifou | 1,146 | 9,225 | 2025 | |
| Bahamas | Great Abaco | 1,144 | 14,208 | 2010 | |
| France | Martinique | 1,128 | 360,630 | 2023 | |
| Samoa | Upolu | 1,125 | 158,081 | 2021 | |
| Bahamas | Grand Bahama | 1,096 | 51,368 | 2010 | |
| United States | Atka | 1,061 | 56 | 2020 | |
| France | Tahiti | 1,045 | 191,779 | 2022 | |
| Cape Verde | Santiago | 991 | 273,988 | 2021 | |
| Estonia | Hiiumaa | 989 | 8,497 | 2021 | |
| Tanzania | Pemba | 988 | 524,172 | 2022 | |
| Ecuador | Santa Cruz | 985.5 | 17,210 | 2022 | |
| United Kingdom | Mainland Shetland | 968.8 | 18,763 | 2022 | |
| Venezuela | Margarita | 956.8 | 482,625 | 2011 | |
| New Zealand | Chatham | 920 | 573 | 2023 | |
| Germany | Rügen | 946.4 | 61,890 | 2022 | |
| Vanuatu | Efate | 899.5 | 82,292 | 2016 | |
| Vanuatu | Erromango | 888.1 | 2,084 | 2016 | |
| United States | Etolin | 878.1 | 8 | 2020 | |
| United Kingdom | Mull | 875.3 | 3,063 | 2022 | |
| São Tomé & Príncipe | São Tomé | 859 | 199,777 | 2024 | |
| Norway | Langøya | 850.2 | 16,167 | 2026 | |
| Spain | Lanzarote | 845.9 | 166,146 | 2025 | |
| Greece | Chios | 842.3 | 50,358 | 2021 | |
| France | Basse-Terre | 841.5 | 180,928 | 2023 | |
| Norway | Sørøya | 811.4 | 1,098 | 2026 | |
| Cape Verde | Santo Antão | 785 | 36,950 | 2021 | |
| Greece | Cephalonia | 773 | 36,066 | 2021 | |
| Eritrea | Dahlak Kebir | 754.9 | 2,500 | N/A | |
| Dominica | Dominica | 751 | 71,293 | 2011 | |
| Portugal | São Miguel | 744.5 | 138,557 | 2025 | |
| Portugal | Madeira | 740.7 | 259,214 | 2025 | |
| Norway | Kvaløya | 737.1 | 12,122 | 2026 | |
| Russia | Olkhon | 730 | 1,921 | 2021 | |
| United States | Adak | 711.2 | 171 | 2020 | |
| Spain | La Palma | 708.3 | 86,297 | 2025 | |
| Denmark | Ammassalik | 699 | 1,811 | 2026 | |
| Spain | Menorca | 694.4 | 102,821 | 2025 | |
| Solomon Islands | Kolombangara | 690.2 | 6,301 | 2009 | |
| Haiti | Gonâve | 689.6 | 87,077 | 2015 | |
| Finland | Fasta Åland | 686.9 | 28,846 | 2025 | |
| Vanuatu | Ambrym | 677.7 | 7,385 | 2016 | |
| United Kingdom | Anglesey | 675 | 54,779 | 2021 | |
| United States | Molokai | 673.4 | 7,369 | 2020 | |
| Solomon Islands | Rennell | 666.2 | 2,032 | 2009 | |
| Norway | Ringvassøya | 661 | 1,357 | 2026 | |
| Oman | Masirah | 649 | 17,215 | 2026 | |
| Mexico | Cozumel | 647.3 | 88,626 | 2020 | |
| France | Maré | 641.7 | 6,284 | 2025 | |
| Cape Verde | Boa Vista | 631.1 | 12,798 | 2021 | |
| Solomon Islands | Vella Lavella | 628.9 | 12,648 | 2009 | |
| United Kingdom | Islay | 619.5 | 3,180 | 2022 | |
| Saint Lucia | Saint Lucia | 616 | 172,948 | 2022 | |
| Greece | Corfu | 610.9 | 98,261 | 2021 | |
| Bahrain | Bahrain | 604 | 1,221,849 | 2025 | |
| Bahamas | Long Island | 596 | 3,094 | 2010 | |
| Denmark | Bornholm | 588.4 | 38,677 | 2026 | |
| France | Grande-Terre | 586.7 | 189,240 | 2023 | |
| Norway | Seiland | 583.1 | 190 | 2026 | |
| Sierra Leone | Sherbro | 580.5 | 57,539 | 2021 | |
| United Kingdom | Isle of Man | 572 | 84,069 | 2021 | |
| Norway | Hitra | 571.5 | 4,097 | 2026 | |
| Spain | Ibiza | 571 | 164,265 | 2025 | |
| Ecuador | San Cristóbal | 558.1 | 8,155 | 2022 | |
| Vanuatu | Tanna | 555 | 32,280 | 2016 | |
| United States | Wrangell | 544 | 2,005 | 2020 | |
| United States | Guam | 543.6 | 153,836 | 2020 | |
| United States | Mitkof | 539.7 | 3,276 | 2020 | |
| Tanzania | Ukerewe | 530 | 334,997 | 2022 | |
| Norway | Austvågøya | 526.7 | 9,067 | 2026 | |
| Finland | Kimitoön | 524.1 | 6,103 | 2025 | |
| United Kingdom | Mainland Orkney | 523.2 | 17,779 | 2022 | |
| Canada | Porcher | 521.7 | 31 | 2021 | |
| Tunisia | Djerba | 514 | 187,831 | 2024 | |
| Denmark | Falster | 513.7 | 41,239 | 2026 | |
| Solomon Islands | Vangunu | 509 | 6,170 | 2009 | |
| Solomon Islands | Nendö | 505.5 | 9,260 | 2009 | |
| Vanuatu | Pentecost | 490.5 | 16,899 | 2016 | |
| Solomon Islands | South Malaita | 482.3 | 12,967 | 2009 | |
| Vanuatu | Epi | 444.7 | 5,824 | 2016 | |
| Fiji | Taveuni | 434 | 13,774 | 2017 | |
| Solomon Islands | Rendova | 411.3 | 4,201 | 2009 | |
| Fiji | Kadavu | 411 | 9,959 | 2017 | |
| Vanuatu | Ambae | 402 | 10,858 | 2016 | |
| United States | Lanai | 363.9 | 3,367 | 2020 | |
| France | Nuku Hiva | 339 | 3,025 | 2022 | |
| Vanuatu | Vanua Lava | 334.3 | 3,059 | 2016 | |
| Micronesia | Pohnpei | 334.1 | 33,968 | 2010 | |
| Palau | Babeldaob | 331 | 5,234 | 2015 | |
| Vanuatu | Gaua | 328.2 | 2,533 | 2016 | |
| France | Hiva Oa | 316 | 2,371 | 2022 | |
| Kiribati | Kiritimati | 312.4 | 7,369 | 2020 | |
| Vanuatu | Maewo | 303.6 | 3,577 | 2016 | |
| New Zealand | Great Barrier | 285 | 1,239 | 2023 | |
| New Zealand | Niue | 261.4 | 1,689 | 2022 | |
| Tonga | Tongatapu | 260.5 | 74,351 | 2021 | |

== See also ==
- List of islands by area
