= List of Canadian islands by area =

Overview of Canada's largest islands

This is a list of Canadian islands as ordered by area. It includes all 51 islands with an area greater than 1,000 km^{2} (390 sq mi). The total area of these islands is 1,554,181.09 km^{2} (600,072.67 sq mi)

== Islands over 1,000 km^{2} (390 sq mi) ==
Ran	World rank	Island (Note: Area of all islands are from 2026 unless indicated in brackets in this column)	Area (2026) (Note: All areas from the United States Geological Survey, Esri, and the United Nations Environment Programme - World Conservation Monitoring Centre unless indicated otherwise)		Province or territory	Permanent population (2021)	Notes	Ref
Ran	World rank	Island	(km^{2})	(sq mi)	Province or territory	Permanent population (2021)	Notes	Ref
1	5	Baffin Island	507,204.95	195,832.93	Nunavut	13,039	Largest in Canada, second in North America, and fifth in the world. Population does not include Kinngait (1,396) and Qikiqtarjuaq (593), both of which do not lie on Baffin Island proper.	
2	8	Victoria Island	219,191.31	84,630.24	Northwest Territories, Nunavut	2,168	Contains the world's largest island within an island within an island.	
3	10	Ellesmere Island	197,790.33	76,367.27	Nunavut	144	Canada's northernmost island. Population includes Grise Fiord, Alert and Eureka.	
4	15	Newfoundland	108,878.06	42,038.05	Newfoundland and Labrador	470,627	The largest island in Canada outside the Arctic. Population is an estimate. (Note: Population for the island obtained by deducting Brighton (163), Change Islands (184), Cottlesville (244), Crow Head (156), Division No. 1, Subd. R (264), Division No. 7, Subd. L (1,183), Division No. 8, Subd. D (5), Division No. 8, Subd. H (1,788), Division No. 8, Subd. I (163), Fogo Island (2,117), Greenspond (257), Little Bay Islands (0), Lushes Bight-Beaumont-Beaumont North (169), Miles Cove (97), Pilley's Island (286), Port Anson (42), Ramea (388), St. Brendan's (125), Summerford (805), Triton (896), Twillingate (2,121), Wabana (1,815), and Labrador (26,655), from the province of Newfoundland and Labrador (510,550).)	
5	24	Banks Island	70,191.02	27,100.90	Northwest Territories	104	Robert McClure's ship, the HMS Investigator, was found at Mercy Bay in 2010. The ship had been lost during the McClure Arctic expedition.	
6	27	Devon Island	55,535.39	21,442.33	Nunavut	0	The largest uninhabited island in the world.	
7	32	Southampton Island	43,069.35	16,629.17	Nunavut	1,035	The only portion of Nunavut that does not follow daylight saving time.	
8	33	Melville Island	42,330.26	16,343.80	Northwest Territories, Nunavut	0	One of two major breeding grounds for the brant goose. DNA analysis and field observations suggest that these birds may be distinct from other brant stocks.	
9	34	Axel Heiberg Island	42,276.97	16,323.23	Nunavut	0	Location of the McGill Arctic Research Station that was established in 1960.	
10	40	Prince of Wales Island	33,307.98	12,860.28	Nunavut	0	The CBC series North of North is set in the fictional town of Ice Cove, which is situated on the island.	
11	42	Vancouver Island	31,815.31	12,283.96	British Columbia	840,281	Population is an estimate. (Note: Population Obtained by adding North Vancouver Island Health Service Delivery Area (131,434), Central Vancouver Island Health Service Delivery Area (293,399), and South Vancouver Island Health Service Delivery Area (415,541).)	
12	46	Somerset Island	24,754.51	9,557.77	Nunavut	0	Site of Fort Ross, Nunavut, the last trading post established by the Hudson's Bay Company.	
13	54	Bathurst Island	16,050.61	6,197.18	Nunavut	0	Site of Brooman Point Village, a Dorset, Paleo-Eskimo, and Thule village.	
14	55	Prince Patrick Island	15,792.19	6,097.40	Northwest Territories	0	Home of the now abandoned Mould Bay Weather Station. (Note: Listed as Elleg Ringens)	
15	59	King William Island	13,174.63	5,086.75	Nunavut	1,349	John Franklin abandoned his ships in the region.	
16	67	Ellef Ringnes Island	11,350.45	4,382.43	Nunavut	0	Home of Isachsen, a formerly staffed weather station, but now an Automated Surface Observing System station.	
17	69	Bylot Island	11,057.96	4,269.50	Nunavut	0	Home to Sirmilik National Park and Bylot Island Migratory Bird Sanctuary.	
18	74	Cape Breton Island	10,513.17	4,059.16	Nova Scotia	132,019		
19	78	Prince Charles Island	9,665.87	3,732.01	Nunavut	0	Inuit visited the island to hunt caribou.	
20	90	Anticosti Island	7,953.55	3,070.88	Quebec	177		
21	96	Cornwallis Island	7,070.11	2,729.78	Nunavut	183		
22	100	Graham Island	6,552.25	2,529.84	British Columbia	3,314	Population is an estimate. (Note: Population obtained by adding Masset, Masset 1, Port Clements, Queen Charlotte 4, and Skidegate 1.)	
23	105	Prince Edward Island	5,740.96	2,216.60	Prince Edward Island	154,331		
24	106	Coats Island	5,708.64	2,204.12	Nunavut	0	The last home of the Sadlermiut.	
25	112	Amund Ringnes Island	5,289.51	2,042.29	Nunavut	0		
26	116	Mackenzie King Island	5,056.27	1,952.24	Northwest Territories, Nunavut	0		
27	126	Stefansson Island	4,490.11	1,733.64	Nunavut	0		
28	159	Mansel Island	3,162.26	1,220.96	Nunavut	0		
29	161	Akimiski Island	3,112.89	1,201.89	Nunavut	0	Part of the Attawapiskat First Nation's (Omushkego or Omushkegowuk Cree) traditional territory. The island's name is Swampy Cree for "land across the water".	
30	170	Moresby Island	2,929.22	1,130.98	British Columbia	325		
31	173	Borden Island	2,795.95	1,079.52	Northwest Territories, Nunavut	0		
32	174	Manitoulin Island (2005) (Note: Area (and possibly island) not shown on USGS, Esri and UNEP-WCMC map)	2,766	1,068	Ontario	13,935	Largest lake island (including both freshwater and saltwater lakes).	
33	189	Princess Royal Island	2,294.15	885.78	British Columbia	0		
34	194	Cornwall Island	2,265.48	874.71	Nunavut	0		
35	210	René-Levasseur Island (2005)	2,020	780	Quebec	0	Largest artificial island and second largest lake island.	
36	219	Flaherty Island	1,861.56	718.75	Nunavut	1,010	One of the Belcher Islands. Named in honour of Robert J. Flaherty who wrote and directed Nanook of the North.	
37	230	Air Force Island	1,737.74	670.95	Nunavut	0		
38	231	Richards Island	1,728.47	667.37	Northwest Territories	0		
39	254	Eglinton Island	1,538.91	594.18	Northwest Territories	0		
40	270	Pitt Island	1,398.55	539.98	British Columbia	0		
41	272	Graham Island	1,376.93	531.64	Nunavut	0		
42	277	Nottingham Island	1,349.62	521.09	Nunavut	0		
43	279	Lougheed Island	1,331.12	513.95	Nunavut	0		
44	296	Wales Island	1,176.81	454.37	Nunavut	0		
45	299	Byam Martin Island	1,164.26	449.52	Nunavut	0		
46	307	Île Vanier	1,122.77	433.50	Nunavut	0		
47	308	Rowley Island	1,119.79	432.35	Nunavut	0	Site of an unmanned Distant Early Warning Line base known as FOX-1, in addition to an Automated Surface Observing System station.	
48	316	Cameron Island	1,062.19	410.11	Nunavut	0	From 1985 to the late 1990s, oil was shipped from the Bent Horn oil field in the island's southwest to Montreal.	
49	322	Banks Island	1,034.18	399.30	British Columbia	0		
50	325	Resolution Island	1,011.63	390.59	Nunavut	0	Site of CFS Resolution Island (BAF-5).	
51	326	Nagjuttuuq (Vansittart Island)	1,008.89	389.53	Nunavut	0		

== See also ==
- List of Canadian islands by population
- List of islands of Canada
- Lists of islands
