= Digges Sound =

Arctic waterway in Nunavut, Canada

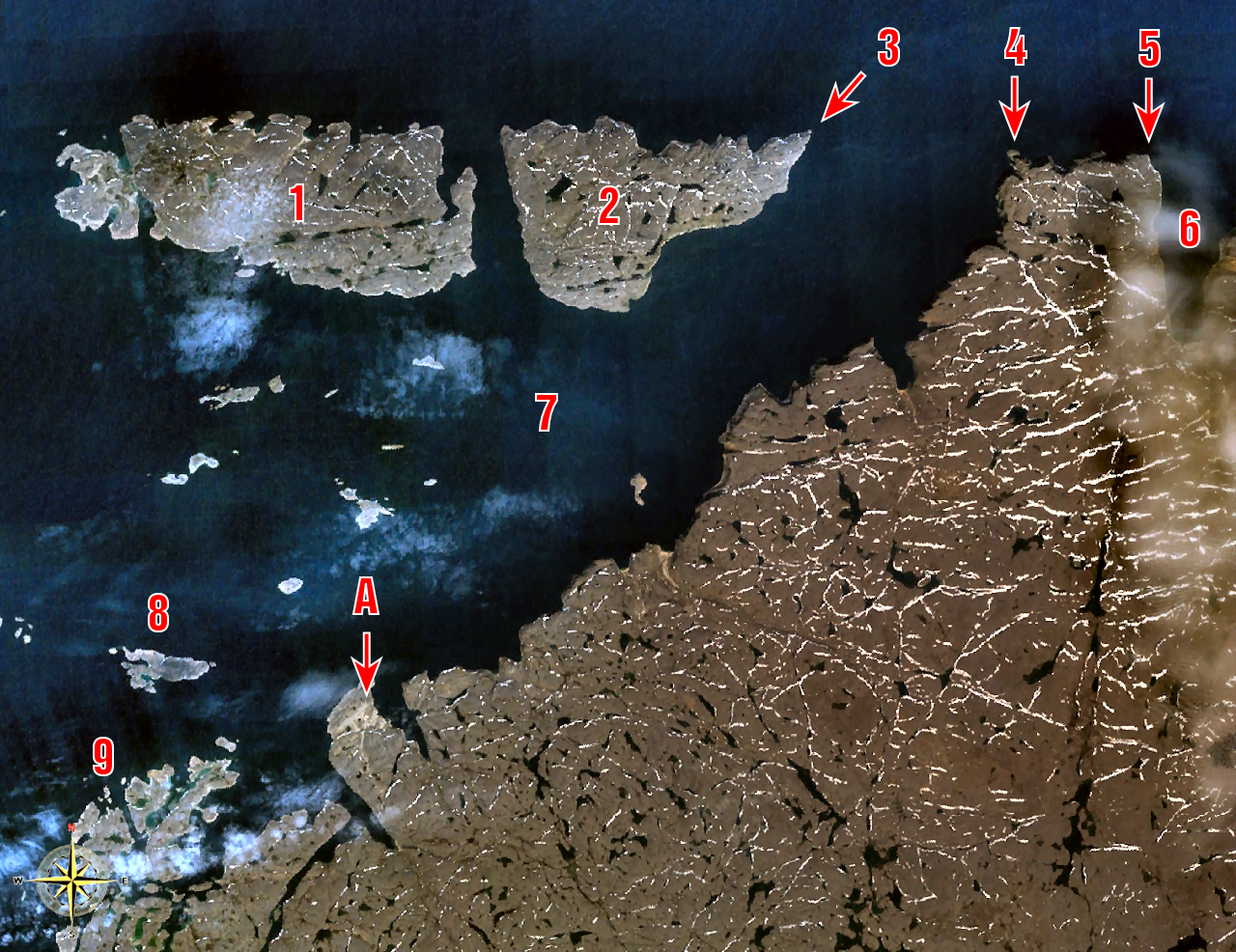
- Digges Sound (7) and surrounding islands and mainland. Click on image for full legend.

- Location within Nunavut
- Coordinates: 62°55′N 077°58′W
- Basin countries: Canada
- Surface area: 12 km^{2} (4.6 sq mi)

Digges Sound is a Canadian Arctic waterway in Qikiqtaaluk, Nunavut, Canada. The sound is located at the juncture where the Hudson Strait meets northeastern Hudson Bay close to the northern tip of the Ungava Peninsula, between Digges Islands and Cape Wolstenholme. Ivujivik, Quebec, the northernmost settlement in any Canadian province, is located on the south coast of the sound.

Henry Hudson named many Arctic geographical features after patrons who financed his voyages, including Digges Sound in honor of Dudley Digges.

== Geography ==
The sound's environs are approximately 12 km^{2} (4.6 sq mi) in size, with an elevation up to 300 m (980 ft) above sea level, and are characterized by rocky cliffs.

== Fauna ==
Notable bird species include the black guillemot and the colonial Iceland gull, and thick-billed murre.

Beluga, bearded seal, polar bear, and ringed seal frequent the area.

== Conservation ==
The sound is classified as an Important Bird Area site (#NU001), an International Biological Program site (Site 6–7), a Key Marine Habitat Site (Site 27), and a Key Migratory Bird Terrestrial Habitat site (NU site 47).
