= North Tweedsmuir Island =

Island in Nunavut, Canada

- Location within Nunavut Location within Canada

Geography
- Location: Foxe Basin
- Coordinates: 68°37′N 74°45′W
- Archipelago: Arctic Archipelago

Administration
- Canada
- Nunavut: Nunavut
- Region: Qikiqtaaluk

Demographics
- Population: Uninhabited

North Tweedsmuir Island is one of the Canadian arctic islands located in Foxe Basin, separated from the southwest coast of Baffin Island by Clarke Sound. It is part of the Qikiqtaaluk Region of Nunavut, Canada. Foley Island is to the west and South Tweedsmuir Island is to the south.

North Tweedsmuir Island is uninhabited and its temperatures are extremely cold. The island is named after John Buchan, 1st Baron Tweedsmuir.
