= Rowley Island =

Uninhabited island in Nunavut, Canada

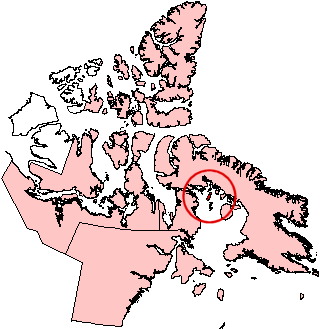
- Rowley Island, Nunavut.

- Location within Nunavut Location within Canada

Geography
- Location: Foxe Basin
- Coordinates: 69°09′N 78°52′W
- Archipelago: Arctic Archipelago
- Area: 1,119.79 km^{2} (432.35 sq mi) (2026)
- Area rank: 47th in Canada & 308th worldwide

Administration
- Canada
- Territory: Nunavut
- Region: Qikiqtaaluk

Rowley Island is an uninhabited island in the Arctic Archipelago and is located in the Qikiqtaaluk Region, Nunavut. It is located in Foxe Basin and has an area of 1,119.79 km^{2} (432.35 sq mi). Located on the island is both a former Distant Early Warning Line base, now an unstaffed North Warning System site, called FOX-1 at 69°04′01″N 079°03′54″W, and an automatic weather station. It is named after the Arctic explorer Graham Westbrook Rowley.
