= List of islands by area =

Islands larger than 1,000 sq. km

This list includes 329 islands in the world larger than 1,000 km^{2} (390 sq mi). For size and location reference, the four continental landmasses are also included. All landmasses are arranged in descending order.

Dymaxion map (Fuller map) showing the continental landmasses (I, II, III, and IV) and the largest islands (1–30) roughly to scale

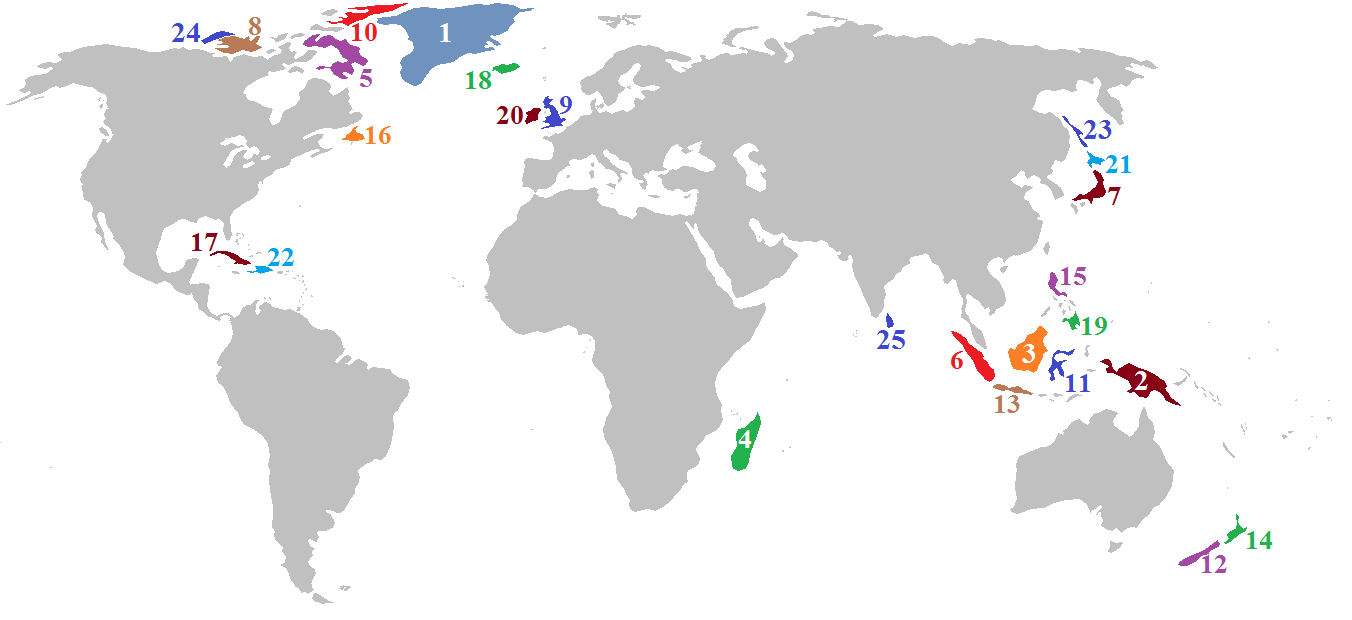
Map of the world showing the 25 largest islands (Robinson projection)

== Continental landmasses ==
Generally, the continental landmasses are not all classified as islands despite being completely surrounded by water. (Note: The United States Geological Survey is a notable exception. The United States-based scientific agency classifies all landmasses (including all continental mainlands except Antarctica) surrounded by water as islands. Under their definition, Africa, Australia, Eurasia, North America, and South America are classified as continental mainland islands.) However, because the definition of continent varies between geographers, the Americas are sometimes defined as two separate continents while mainland Australia is sometimes defined as an island as well as a continent. (Note: Geoscience Australia notes that 'Australia is often referred to as an island continent')

Nevertheless, for the purposes of this list, mainland Australia along with the other three major landmasses have been listed as continental landmasses for comparison. The figures are approximations and are for the four continental landmasses only. (Note: Physiographically, there are only four continents (including offshore continental islands which sit on the nearby continental shelves) that are completely surrounded by the ocean: Africa-Eurasia (57% of the global land area), the Americas (28.5%), Antarctica (9%), and Australia (5%). The remaining 0.5% is made up of remote oceanic islands, mostly scattered within Oceania in the central and south Pacific Ocean.)

Rank	Continental landmass (Note: Including continental landmasses which are above water and over 2,500,000 km^{2} (970,000 sq mi). The submerged continent of Zealandia (approx. 5,000,000 km^{2} (1,900,000 sq mi)) is excluded.)	Area		Nation(s)	Notes
Rank	Continental landmass	(km^{2})	(sq mi)	Nation(s)	Notes
I	Afro-Eurasia (Africa-Eurasia)	79,810,726 (Note: Figure derived from the Global Islands Explorer website, by adding the areas of mainland Africa (29,370,907 km^{2} (11,340,171 sq mi)) and mainland Eurasia (50,439,819 km^{2} (19,474,923 sq mi)).)	30,815,094	126 countries 6 de facto states	48 countries and two de facto states on mainland Africa. (Note: Egypt has a small portion of its land located on mainland Eurasia.); 78 countries and four de facto states on mainland Eurasia: 38 countries and two de facto states on continental Asia. (Note: Azerbaijan, Georgia, Kazakhstan, and Turkey each have a small portion of their land located on continental Europe. Malaysia has a significant portion of its land located on an island.) (Note: Abkhazia and South Ossetia are both located south of the Greater Caucasus watershed, and thus they are geographically parts of Asia.); 40 countries and two de facto states on continental Europe (Note: Russia has a big portion of its land located on continental Asia. Denmark's capital city is located on an island.)
II	America (landmass)	37,699,623 (Note: Figure derived from the Global Islands Explorer website, by adding the areas of mainland North America (20,090,075 km^{2} (7,756,821 sq mi)) and mainland South America (17,609,548 km^{2} (6,799,084 sq mi)).)	14,555,906	22 countries 1 overseas territory	10 countries on mainland North America. (Note: Depending on the definition, a significant portion of Panama (land east of the Panama Canal) could be considered a part of mainland South America.); 12 countries and French Guiana (an overseas department and region of France) on mainland South America.
III	Antarctica	12,272,800 (Note: Area of mainland Antarctica, without the ice shelves and nearby islands.)	4,738,600	None (Note: Seven countries have made eight territorial claims. All territorial claims in Antarctica are in abeyance under the Antarctic Treaty System.)	Antarctica is a special case, for if its ice is considered not as land, but as water, it is not a single landmass, but several landmasses of much smaller area, since the ice-bedrock boundary is below sea level in many regions of the continent. If its ice cover were to be lifted, some rocks that are currently below sea level would rise as the weight of the ice would be removed, although this would in part be counteracted, and in some areas of the continent overtaken, by eustatic rises in sea level.
IV	Australia (mainland)	7,591,608 (Note: Figure derived from the Geoscience Australia website, the area of mainland Tasmania (64,519 km^{2} (24,911 sq mi)) has been deducted. The Global Islands Explorer website has given a slightly larger figure of 7,618,696 km^{2} (2,941,595 sq mi) for the area of mainland Australia.)	2,931,136	Australia	Mainland Australia is more than three times the size of Greenland, the largest island. Australia is sometimes dubbed "The Island Continent" or "Earth's largest island, but its smallest continent".

== Islands with areas of 1,000 km^{2} (390 sq mi) or greater ==
Rank	Island (Note: Area of all islands are from 2026 unless indicated in brackets in column.)	Area (2026) (Note: All areas from the United States Geological Survey, Esri, and the United Nations Environment Programme - World Conservation Monitoring Centre unless indicated otherwise.)		Nation(s)	Subnational divisions	Notes
Rank	Island	(km^{2})	(sq mi)	Nation(s)	Subnational divisions	Notes
1	Greenland (Kalaallit Nunaat, main island)	2,108,459.47	814,080.75	Danish Realm (Kingdom of Denmark)	Greenland	Largest island in North America (Note: Based on the seven continent model.)
2	New Guinea	773,751.01	298,746.94	Indonesia; Papua New Guinea	Papua and Central, Highland, South, West, and Southwest Papua; Highlands, Momase, and Southern regions	Largest island in Oceania
3	Borneo	723,154.07	279,211.35	Brunei; Indonesia; Malaysia	— Central, East, North, South, and West Kalimantan; Sabah and Sarawak	Largest island in Asia
4	Madagascar (main island)	592,521.41	228,773.80	Madagascar		Largest island in Africa
5	Baffin Island	507,204.95	195,832.93	Canada	Nunavut	Largest island in the Arctic Archipelago
6	Sumatra	428,134.16	165,303.52	Indonesia	Aceh, Bengkulu, Jambi, Lampung, Riau, North, South, and West Sumatra	
7	Honshu	228,296.26	88,145.68	Japan	Chūbu, Chūgoku, Kansai, Kantō, and Tōhoku regions	
8	Victoria Island	219,191.31	84,630.24	Canada	Northwest Territories and Nunavut	
9	Great Britain	218,634.50	84,415.25	United Kingdom	England, Scotland, and Wales	Largest island in Europe
10	Ellesmere Island	197,790.33	76,367.27	Canada	Nunavut	
11	Sulawesi	169,981.39	65,630.18	Indonesia	Gorontalo, Central, North, South, Southeast, and West Sulawesi	
12	South Island (Te Waipounamu)	150,683.06	58,179.05	New Zealand	Nelson, Tasman, Marlborough, West Coast, Canterbury, Otago, and Southland	
13	Java	127,467.41	49,215.44	Indonesia	Banten, Jakarta, Yogyakarta, Central, East, and West Java	
14	North Island (Te Ika-a-Māui)	114,573.11	44,236.93	New Zealand	Auckland, Bay of Plenty, Gisborne, Hawke's Bay, Manawatū-Whanganui, Northland, Taranaki, Waikato, and Wellington regions	
15	Newfoundland	108,878.06	42,038.05	Canada	Newfoundland and Labrador	
16	Cuba (main island)	105,468.33	40,721.55	Cuba		
17	Luzon (main island)	104,835.31	40,477.14	Philippines	Bicol, Cagayan Valley, Calabarzon, Central Luzon, Cordillera, Ilocos, and Metro Manila	
18	Iceland (main island)	100,260.91	38,710.95	Iceland		
19	Mindanao (main island)	94,468.78	36,474.60	Philippines	Caraga, Davao, Bangsamoro, Northern Mindanao, Soccsksargen, and Zamboanga Peninsula	
20	Ireland	83,720.80	32,324.78	Republic of Ireland; United Kingdom	— Northern Ireland	
21	Hokkaido	77,658.66	29,984.18	Japan	Hokkaido	
22	Hispaniola	74,365.90	28,712.83	Dominican Republic; Haiti		
23	Sakhalin	74,237.11	28,663.11	Russia	Sakhalin Oblast	
24	Banks Island	70,191.02	27,100.90	Canada	Northwest Territories	
25	Sri Lanka (main island)	65,916.13	25,450.36	Sri Lanka		
26	Tasmania (main island)	64,333.21	24,839.19	Australia	Tasmania	
27	Devon Island	55,535.39	21,442.33	Canada	Nunavut	Largest uninhabited island in the world
28	Alexander Island (Adelaïde)	51,947.36	20,056.99		Antarctica	Largest island in Antarctica
29	Isla Grande de Tierra del Fuego	47,271.77	18,251.73	Argentina; Chile	Tierra del Fuego Province; Magallanes Region	Largest island in South America
30	Severny Island (northern Novaya Zemlya)	45,245.73	17,469.47	Russia	Arkhangelsk Oblast	
31	Berkner Island (Note: Area (and possibly island) not shown on USGS, Esri and UNEP-WCMC map.) (1991)	43,873.1	16,939.5		Antarctica	Antarctic territorial claims by Argentina (partial), Chile, and the United Kingdom
32	Southampton Island	43,069.35	16,629.17	Canada	Nunavut	
33	Melville Island	42,330.26	16,343.80	Canada	Northwest Territories and Nunavut	
34	Axel Heiberg Island	42,276.97	16,323.23	Canada	Nunavut	
35	Spitsbergen	37,379.69	14,432.38	Norway	Svalbard	
36	Kyushu	36,837.80	14,223.15	Japan	Kyushu	
37	Taiwan (main island)	35,935.90	13,874.93	Taiwan		
38	New Britain	35,593.19	13,742.61	Papua New Guinea	East and West New Britain Provinces	
39	Hainan (main island)	34,242.70	13,221.18	China	Hainan	
40	Prince of Wales Island	33,307.98	12,860.28	Canada	Nunavut	
41	Yuzhny Island (southern Novaya Zemlya)	32,342.54	12,487.52	Russia	Arkhangelsk	
42	Vancouver Island	31,815.31	12,283.96	Canada	British Columbia	
43	Marajó	31,387.76	12,118.88	Brazil	Pará	World's largest river island (flluvial) island
44	Timor	28,791.02	11,116.27	Timor-Leste; Indonesia	— East Nusa Tenggara	
45	Sicily (Sicilia)	25,498.34	9,844.96	Italy	Sicily	
46	Somerset Island	24,754.51	9,557.77	Canada	Nunavut	
47	Sardinia (Sardegna)	23,826.57	9,199.49	Italy	Sardinia	
48	Kotelny Island (Kotel'nyy)	23,553.48	9,094.05	Russia	Sakha Republic	
49	Bananal Island (date ?)	19,162.25	7,398.59	Brazil	Tocantins	World's second largest river island and largest without ocean access
50	Shikoku	18,372.83	7,093.79	Japan	Shikoku	
51	Halmahera	18,110.20	6,992.39	Indonesia	North Maluku	
52	Seram Island	17,510.68	6,760.91	Indonesia	Maluku	
53	Grande Terre	16,368.26	6,319.82	France	New Caledonia	Sui generis collectivity
54	Bathurst Island	16,050.61	6,197.18	Canada	Nunavut	
55	Prince Patrick Island	15,792.19	6,097.40	Canada	Northwest Territories	
56	Sumbawa	14,510.79	5,602.65	Indonesia	West Nusa Tenggara	
57	Nordaustlandet	14,213.90	5,488.02	Norway	Svalbard	
58	Flores	14,127.78	5,454.77	Indonesia	East Nusa Tenggara	
59	October Revolution Island (Oktyabr'skoy Revolyutsi)	14,119.63	5,451.62	Russia	Krasnoyarsk Krai	
60	King William Island	13,174.63	5,086.75	Canada	Nunavut	
61	Negros	12,849.94	4,961.39	Philippines	Negros Island Region	
62	Thurston Island (Pierre le Grand, Peter the Great)	12,690.82	4,899.95		Antarctica	Unclaimed island.
63	Samar	12,518.20	4,833.30	Philippines	Eastern Visayas	
64	Yos Sudarso Island (Dolok, Frederik Hendrik)	11,694.60	4,515.31	Indonesia	Papua	
65	Bangka Island	11,611.88	4,483.37	Indonesia	Bangka Belitung Islands	
66	Palawan	11,498.00	4,439.40	Philippines	Mimaropa	
67	Panay	11,489.76	4,436.22	Philippines	Western Visayas	
68	Ellef Ringnes Island	11,350.45	4,382.43	Canada	Nunavut	(Note: Listed as Elleg Ringens.)
69	Bolshevik Island	11,206.59	4,326.89	Russia	Krasnoyarsk Krai	
70	Bylot Island	11,057.96	4,269.50	Canada	Nunavut	
71	Jamaica (main island)	11,037.29	4,261.52	Jamaica		
72	Sumba	10,979.56	4,239.23	Indonesia	East Nusa Tenggara	
73	Viti Levu	10,691.25	4,127.91	Fiji	Central and Western Divisions	
74	Cape Breton Island	10,513.17	4,059.16	Canada	Nova Scotia	
75	Hawaiʻi (Big Island)	10,492.91	4,051.34	United States	Hawaii	
76	Mindoro	9,859.38	3,806.73	Philippines	Mimaropa	
77	Unnamed Island	9,794.21	3,781.57		Antarctica	Located at 77°37′31″S 78°21′05″W
78	Prince Charles Island	9,665.87	3,732.01	Canada	Nunavut	
79	Kodiak Island	9,395.14	3,627.48	United States	Alaska	
80	Cyprus (main island)	9,283.52	3,584.39	Cyprus	Akrotiri and Dhekelia	Sovereign Base Areas of the United Kingdom and Northern Cyprus. The Turkish Republic of Northern Cyprus claims and controls one third of the island of Cyprus although this is not recognised by any country except Turkey
81	Komsomolets Island	8,948.02	3,454.85	Russia	Krasnoyarsk Krai	
82	Puerto Rico (main island)	8,759.47	3,382.05	Puerto Rico		Insular area of the United States
83	Bougainville Island	8,750.75	3,378.68	Papua New Guinea	Autonomous Region of Bougainville	
84	Corsica (Corse)	8,729.67	3,370.54	France	Corsica	
85	Buru	8,584.82	3,314.62	Indonesia	Maluku	
86	Roosevelt Island	8,452.07	3,263.36		Antarctica	Antarctic territorial claim by New Zealand. Status as an island is disputed
87	Disko Island	8,449.43	3,262.34	Danish Realm (Kingdom of Denmark)	Greenland	
88	Chiloé Island	8,320.61	3,212.61	Chile	Los Lagos Region	
89	Crete (Kriti)	8,296.38	3,203.25	Greece	Crete	
90	Anticosti Island	7,953.55	3,070.88	Canada	Quebec	
91	Tupinambarana (western part)	7,700	3,000	Brazil	Amazonas	
92	Wrangel Island (Vrangelya)	7,614.84	2,940.11	Russia	Chukotka Autonomous Okrug	
93	Carney Island (Île de l'Ours)	7,311.65	2,823.04		Antarctica	Unclaimed island
94	Prince of Wales Island	7,232.07	2,792.32	United States	Alaska	
95	Zealand (Sjaelland)	7,161.09	2,764.91	Danish Realm (Kingdom of Denmark)	Denmark, Zealand and Capital regions	
96	New Ireland	7,073.13	2,730.95	Papua New Guinea	New Ireland Province	
97	Cornwallis Island	7,070.11	2,729.78	Canada	Nunavut	
98	Leyte	7,056.36	2,724.48	Philippines	Eastern Visayas	
99	Arga Muora Sise	6,962.44	2,688.21	Russia	Sakha Republic	Claimed to be the largest island in the Lena delta which is the largest delta in the Arctic
100	Grande Terre (Kerguelen)	6,576.19	2,539.08	France	French Southern and Antarctic Lands overseas territory	
101	Graham Island	6,552.25	2,529.84	Canada	British Columbia	
102	East Falkland	6,502.10	2,510.47	Falkland Islands		A British Overseas Territory administered by the United Kingdom and disputed by Argentina who refer to them as Islas Malvinas
103	New Siberia (Novaya Sibir)	6,240.45	2,409.45	Russia	Sakha Republic	
104	Wellington Island	5,864.04	2,264.12	Chile	Magallanes Region	
105	Vanua Levu	5,816.86	2,245.90	Fiji	Northern Division	
106	Prince Edward Island	5,740.96	2,216.60	Canada	Prince Edward Island	
107	Coats Island	5,708.64	2,204.12	Canada	Nunavut	
108	Melville Island	5,656.95	2,184.16	Australia	Northern Territory	
109	Siple Island (Île de l'Ours)	5,629.96	2,173.74		Antarctica	Unclaimed island
110	Bali	5,413.42	2,090.13	Indonesia	Bali	
111	Guadalcanal	5,394.04	2,082.65	Solomon Islands	Guadalcanal Province and Capital Territory	
112	Chichagof Island (Shee Kaax, Chicagof)	5,393.02	2,082.26	United States	Alaska	
113	Amund Ringnes Island	5,289.51	2,042.29	Canada	Nunavut	
114	Bolshoy Lyakhovsky Island; Great Lyakhovsky)	5,271.27	2,035.25	Russia	Sakha Republic	
115	Riesco Island (2003)	5,110	1,970	Chile	Magallanes Region	
116	Kolguyev Island	5,070.58	1,957.76	Russia	Nenets Autonomous Okrug	
117	Mackenzie King Island	5,056.27	1,952.24	Canada	Northwest Territories and Nunavut	
118	Thwaites Iceberg Tongue (Île de l'Ours)	5,041.55	1,946.55		Antarctica	Located at 74°01′36″S 108°40′06″W
119	Edgeøya	4,988.68	1,926.14	Norway	Svalbard	
120	Trinidad	4,859.33	1,876.20	Trinidad and Tobago		
121	Isabela Island	4,737.22	1,829.05	Ecuador	Galápagos Province	
122	North Jutlandic Island (Vendsyssel-Thy)	4,665.45	1,801.34	Danish Realm (Kingdom of Denmark)	Denmark, North Jutland Region	Physically part of the Jutland peninsula until 1825
123	Belitung	4,642.55	1,792.50	Indonesia	Bangka Belitung Islands	
124	St. Lawrence Island	4,593.62	1,773.61	United States	Alaska	
125	Lombok	4,569.53	1,764.31	Indonesia	West Nusa Tenggara	
126	Buton	4,534.76	1,750.88	Indonesia	Southeast Sulawesi	
127	Stefansson Island	4,490.11	1,733.64	Canada	Nunavut	
128	Madura Island	4,481.54	1,730.33	Indonesia	East Java	
129	West Falkland	4,450.32	1,718.28	Falkland Islands		A British Overseas Territory administered by the United Kingdom and disputed by Argentina who refer to them as Islas Malvinas
130	Cebu	4,446.53	1,716.81	Philippines	Central Visayas	
131	Kangaroo Island	4,412.31	1,703.60	Australia	South Australia	
132	Admiralty Island	4,396.00	1,697.31	United States	Alaska	
133	Hoste Island	4,251.45	1,641.49	Chile	Magallanes Region	
134	Baranof Island	4,224.87	1,631.23	United States	Alaska	
135	Nunivak Island	4,176.77	1,612.66	United States	Alaska	
136	Nias	4,150.05	1,602.34	Indonesia	North Sumatra	
137	Unimak Island	4,047.19	1,562.63	United States	Alaska	
138	Espiritu Santo	3,959.58	1,528.80	Vanuatu	Sanma Province	
139	Adelaide Island	3,900.04	1,505.81		Antarctica	Antarctic territorial claims by Argentina Chile and United Kingdom
140	Siberut	3,847.75	1,485.62	Indonesia	West Sumatra	
141	Santa Isabel Island	3,812.17	1,471.89	Solomon Islands	Isabel Province	
142	Bohol	3,793.73	1,464.77	Philippines	Central Visayas	
143	Malaita	3,749.11	1,447.54	Solomon Islands	Malaita Province	
144	Milne Land	3,713.42	1,433.76	Danish Realm (Kingdom of Denmark)	Greenland	
145	Korff Ice Rise	3,708.37	1,431.81		Antarctica	Listed as Pourquoi Pas Island by the USGS and located at 78°48′55″S 68°38′40″W
146	Euboea	3,667.18	1,415.91	Greece	Central Greece	
147	Ilha Grande de Gurupá	3,644.20	1,407.03	Brazil	Pará	River island
148	Spaatz Island	3,634.66	1,403.35		Antarctica	Antarctic territorial claims by Chile and United Kingdom
149	Mallorca	3,629.96	1,401.54	Spain	Balearic Islands	
150	Socotra	3,619.23	1,397.39	Yemen	Socotra Governorate	
151	Tupinambarana (northern part)	3,600	1,400	Brazil	Amazonas	
152	South Georgia	3,561.44	1,375.08	South Georgia and the South Sandwich Islands		Part of the British Overseas Territories under sovereignty of the United Kingdom
153	Long Island	3,504.79	1,353.21	United States	New York	
154	Bear Island (2003)	3,500	1,400		Antarctica	Unclaimed island
155	North Andros Island	3,427.04	1,323.19	The Bahamas	North and Central Andros	
156	Traill Island	3,407.67	1,315.71	Danish Realm (Kingdom of Denmark)	Greenland	
157	Yamdena	3,282.79	1,267.49	Indonesia	Maluku	
158	Vaygach Island	3,213.05	1,240.57	Russia	Arkhangelsk Oblast	
159	Masbate Island	3,204.56	1,237.29	Philippines	Bicol Region	
160	Iturup (Etorofu, Ituruo)	3,163.42	1,221.40	Russia	Sakhalin Oblast	Territorial dispute initially part of Japan's Hokkaido region and prefecture then claimed by Russia
161	Mansel Island	3,162.26	1,220.96	Canada	Nunavut	
162	Choiseul Island	3,126.61	1,207.19	Solomon Islands	Choiseul Province	
163	Akimiski Island	3,112.89	1,201.89	Canada	Nunavut	
164	Makira (San Cristóbal)	3,084.69	1,191.01	Solomon Islands	Makira-Ulawa Province	
165	Dalton Iceberg Tongue	3,065.64	1,183.65		Antarctica	Listed as Drygalski Island by the USGS and located at 66°11′34″S 121°40′50″E
166	Waigeo	3,031.90	1,170.62	Indonesia	West Papua	
167	Gotland	3,022.01	1,166.80	Sweden	Gotland County	
168	Funen (Fyn)	2,987.25	1,153.38	Danish Realm (Kingdom of Denmark)	Denmark, Southern Denmark Region	
169	Muna Island	2,955.70	1,141.20	Indonesia	Southeast Sulawesi	
170	Taliabu Island Regency	2,944.65	1,136.94	Indonesia	North Maluku	
171	Peleng	2,944.65	1,136.94	Indonesia	Central Sulawesi	
172	Moresby Island	2,929.22	1,130.98	Canada	British Columbia	
173	Revillagigedo Island	2,928.88	1,130.85	United States	Alaska	
174	Kupreanof Island	2,852.29	1,101.28	United States	Alaska	
175	Borden Island	2,795.95	1,079.52	Canada	Northwest Territories and Nunavut	
176	Manitoulin Island (2005)	2,766	1,068	Canada	Ontario	Largest lake island (including both freshwater and saltwater lakes)
177	Santa Inés Island (Santa Inez)	2,729.04	1,053.69	Chile	Magallanes Region	
178	Saaremaa	2,701.51	1,043.06	Estonia	Saare County (Saaremaa)	
179	Unalaska Island	2,698.41	1,041.86	United States	Alaska	
180	Wetar	2,633.17	1,016.67	Indonesia	Maluku	
181	Zemlya Georga	2,620.44	1,011.76	Russia	Arkhangelsk Oblast	
182	Biak	2,523.65	974.39	Indonesia	Papua	
183	Réunion (main island)	2,520.23	973.07	France	Réunion	Overseas department
184	Navarino Island	2,513.86	970.61	Chile	Magallanes Region	
185	Obi (Obira)	2,480.01	957.54	Indonesia	North Maluku	
186	James Ross Island	2,460.23	949.90		Antarctica	Antarctic territorial claims by Argentina Chile and United Kingdom
187	Ross Island (Beaufort Island)	2,416.35	932.96		Antarctica	Antarctic territorial claim by New Zealand
188	Trangan	2,413.07	931.69	Indonesia	Maluku	
189	Outer Caviana	2,406.41	929.12	Brazil	Pará	
190	Ymer Island	2,390.60	923.02	Danish Realm (Kingdom of Denmark)	Greenland	
191	Princess Royal Island	2,294.15	885.78	Canada	British Columbia	
192	Morotai	2,290.52	884.37	Indonesia	North Maluku	
193	Groote Eylandt	2,289.96	884.16	Australia	Northern Territory	
194	Yapen	2,288.50	883.59	Indonesia	Papua	
195	Nelson Island	2,281.18	880.77	United States	Alaska	
196	Cornwall Island	2,265.48	874.71	Canada	Nunavut	
197	Hinnøya (Hinno)	2,239.07	864.51	Norway	Nordland and Troms	
198	Charcot Island	2,197.30	848.38		Antarctica	Antarctic territorial claims by Chile and United Kingdom
199	Isla de la Juventud	2,196.86	848.21	Cuba	Isla de la Juventud	
200	Lewis and Harris	2,171.72	838.51	United Kingdom	Scotland	
201	Ayon Island	2,156.06	832.46	Russia	Chukotka Autonomous Okrug	
202	Alor Island	2,132.41	823.33	Indonesia	East Nusa Tenggara	
203	Laut Island	2,103.50	812.17	Indonesia	South Kalimantan	
204	Margarita Island	2,100	810	Colombia	Bolívar Department	An inland fluvial or river island in the Magdalena River not to be confused with the Margarita Island a Caribbean Venezuelan island
205	Misool	2,097.39	809.81	Indonesia	West Papua	
206	Magdalena Island	2,082.22	803.95	Chile	Aysén Region	
207	Anvers Island	2,066.83	798.01		Antarctica	Antarctic territorial claims by Argentina Chile and United Kingdom
208	New Georgia	2,065.75	797.59	Solomon Islands	Western Province	
209	Malakula	2,058.20	794.68	Vanuatu	(Malampa Province)	
210	Tenerife	2,047.17	790.42	Spain	Canary Islands	
211	Paramushir	2,030.79	784.09	Russia	Sakhalin Oblast	
212	René-Levasseur Island (2005)	2,020	780	Canada	Quebec	Largest artificial island and second largest lake island
213	Kuiu Island	1,991.52	768.93	United States	Alaska	
214	Wilczek Land (Vil'cheka)	1,970.29	760.73	Russia	Arkhangelsk Oblast	
215	Bioko	1,949.50	752.71	Equatorial Guinea	Bioko Norte and Bioko Sur	
216	Karaginsky Island	1,926.06	743.66	Russia	Kamchatka Krai	
217	Žitný ostrov (2014, Rye Island)	1,900	730	Slovakia	Bratislava, Trnava, and Nitra regions	River island
218	Maui	1,893.19	730.96	United States	Hawaii	
219	Mauritius (main island)	1,872.95	723.15	Mauritius		
220	Bolshoy Begichev Island	1,868.56	721.46	Russia	Sakha Republic	
221	Flaherty Island	1,861.56	718.75	Canada	Nunavut	
222	Manus Island	1,859.34	717.90	Papua New Guinea	Manus Province	
223	Jeju Island	1,845.43	712.52	South Korea	Jeju Province	
224	Afognak Island	1,833.70	708.00	United States	Alaska	
225	Bacan Island	1,823.46	704.04	Indonesia	North Maluku	
226	Bolshoy Shantar Island	1,821.99	703.47	Russia	Khabarovsk Krai	
227	Bely Island	1,799.92	694.95	Russia	Yamalo-Nenets Autonomous Okrug	
228	Nares Land	1,782.84	688.36	Danish Realm (Kingdom of Denmark)	Greenland	
229	Kobroor	1,762.50	680.51	Indonesia	Maluku	
230	Umnak	1,759.41	679.31	United States	Alaska	Unnamed on map
231	Simeulue	1,750.02	675.69	Indonesia	Aceh	
232	Air Force Island	1,737.74	670.95	Canada	Nunavut	
233	Richards Island	1,728.47	667.37	Canada	Northwest Territories	
234	Geographical Society Island	1,724.56	665.86	Danish Realm (Kingdom of Denmark)	Greenland	
235	Savaiʻi	1,714.47	661.96	Samoa	Faʻasaleleaga, Gagaʻemauga, Gagaʻifomauga, Vaisigano, Satupaʻitea, and Palauli	
236	Stewart Island (Rakiura)	1,705.12	658.35	New Zealand	Southland Region	
237	Smyley Island	1,691.88	653.24		Antarctica	Antarctic territorial claims by Chile and United Kingdom
238	K'gari (Fraser Island)	1,672.18	645.63	Australia	Queensland	
239	Fuerteventura	1,671.28	645.28	Spain	Canary Islands	
240	Salawati	1,670.31	644.91	Indonesia	West Papua	
241	Isle of Skye	1,655.88	639.34	United Kingdom	Scotland	
242	Graham Bell Island	1,650.79	637.37	Russia	Arkhangelsk Oblast	
243	Lesbos (Lesvos)	1,637.99	632.43	Greece	North Aegean	
244	Pioneer Island	1,635.44	631.45	Russia	Krasnoyarsk Krai	
245	Soisalo	1,635	631	Finland	North and South Savo	
246	Natuna Besar	1,633.38	630.65	Indonesia	Riau Islands	
247	Bathurst Island	1,624.61	627.27	Australia	Northern Territory	
248	Desolación Island	1,616.91	624.29	Chile	Magallanes Region	
249	Unguja (Zanzibar)	1,601.54	618.36	Tanzania	Unguja North, Unguja South, and Mjini Magharibi regions	
250	Tebing Tinggi Island (Rantau)	1,592.40	614.83	Indonesia	Riau	
251	Senja	1,579.54	609.86	Norway	Troms	
252	Gran Canaria	1,566.15	604.69	Spain	Canary Islands	
253	Oʻahu	1,559.82	602.25	United States	Hawaii	
254	Tanahbesar (Wokam, Aru)	1,548.66	597.94	Indonesia	Maluku	
255	Joinville Island	1,546.53	597.12		Antarctica	Antarctic territorial claims by Argentina Chile and United Kingdom
256	Eglinton Island	1,538.91	594.18	Canada	Northwest Territories	
257	Great Inagua	1,536.17	593.12	The Bahamas	Inagua	
258	Dawson Island	1,519.94	586.85	Chile	Magallanes Region	
259	Middle Andaman Island	1,508.44	582.41	India	Andaman and Nicobar Islands	
260	Rupat	1,505.00	581.08	Indonesia	Riau	
261	Copper Island	1,500	560 (2022)	United States	Michigan	Inland island, separated from the rest of the Keweenaw Peninsula by Portage Lake and the Keweenaw Waterway
262	Qeshm Island	1,495.86	577.55	Iran	Hormozgan province	
263	Kunashir (Kunashiri)	1,468.06	566.82	Russia	Sakhalin Oblast	Territorial dispute initially part of Japan (Hokkaidō region and prefecture then claimed by Russia
264	Clavering Island	1,457.09	562.59	Danish Realm (Kingdom of Denmark)	Greenland	
265	Catanduanes	1,451.16	560.30	Philippines	Bicol Region	
266	Chongming Island	1,448.43	559.24	China	Shanghai	
267	Kauaʻi	1,445.69	558.18	United States	Hawaii	
268	Latady Island	1,425.19	550.27		Antarctica	Antarctic territorial claims by Chile and United Kingdom
269	Urup	1,422.34	549.17	Russia	Sakhalin Oblast	
270	Rhodes (Rodhos)	1,405.94	542.84	Greece	South Aegean	
271	Ramree Island	1,405.69	542.74	Myanmar	Rakhine State	
272	Pitt Island	1,398.55	539.98	Canada	British Columbia	
273	Vicosa Island	1,389.62	536.54	Brazil	Pará	
274	Graham Island	1,376.93	531.64	Canada	Nunavut	
275	Ostrov Khardang-Sise	1,376.93	531.64	Russia	Sakha Republic	
276	Flinders Island (Flinders Land)	1,363.82	526.57	Australia	Tasmania	
277	Öland	1,359.28	524.82	Sweden	Kalmar County	
278	North Andaman Island	1,356.34	523.69	India	Andaman and Nicobar Islands	
279	Nottingham Island	1,349.62	521.09	Canada	Nunavut	
280	Fergusson Island	1,335.35	515.58	Papua New Guinea	Milne Bay Province	
281	Lougheed Island	1,331.12	513.95	Canada	Nunavut	
282	Bhola Island	1,294.54	499.82	Bangladesh	Barisal Division	
283	Aracena Island	1,289.04	497.70	Chile	Magallanes Region	
284	Lembata (Lomblen)	1,273.00	491.51	Indonesia	East Nusa Tenggara	
285	Barentsøya (Barents)	1,267.85	489.52	Norway	Svalbard	
286	Rote Island	1,254.09	484.21	Indonesia	East Nusa Tenggara	
287	South Andaman Island	1,253.41	483.94	India	Andaman and Nicobar Islands	
288	Morfil Island	1,250	480	Senegal	Saint-Louis region	Inland island
289	Lolland	1,246.48	481.27	Danish Realm (Kingdom of Denmark)	Denmark, Region Zealand	
290	Shannon Island	1,245.12	480.74	Danish Realm (Kingdom of Denmark)	Greenland	
291	Basilan	1,244.38	480.46	Philippines	Autonomous Region in Muslim Mindanao and Zamboanga Peninsula	
292	New Hanover Island (Lavongai)	1,223.84	472.53	Papua New Guinea	New Ireland Province	
293	Mangole Island	1,219.54	470.87	Indonesia	North Maluku	
294	Campana Island	1,213.35	468.48	Chile	Aysén Region	
295	Okinawa Island	1,209.31	466.92	Japan	Ryukyu Islands, Okinawa Prefecture and Kyushu	
296	Södertörn (2014)	120.96	46.70	Sweden	Stockholm County	A roughly triangular peninsula and artificial island
297	Tiburón Island	1,201.84	464.03	Mexico	Sonora	
298	Wales Island	1,176.81	454.37	Canada	Nunavut	
299	Bering Island	1,173.87	453.23	Russia	Kamchatka Krai	
300	Bintan Island	1,168.49	451.16	Indonesia	Riau Islands	
301	Byam Martin Island	1,164.26	449.52	Canada	Nunavut	
302	Clarence Island	1,162.79	448.96	Chile	Magallanes Region	
303	Sherman Island (1991)	1,158.6	447.3		Antarctica	
304	King George Island	1,148.73	443.53		Antarctica	Antarctic territorial claims by Argentina Chile and United Kingdom
305	Great Abaco	1,141.69	440.81	The Bahamas	North Central and South Abaco	
306	Lifou Island	1,140.40	440.31	France	New Caledonia	Sui generis collectivity
307	Madre de Dios Island	1,138.21	439.47	Chile	Magallanes Region	
308	Upolu	1,133.16	437.52	Samoa	Tuamasaga, Aʻana, Aiga-i-le-Tai, Atua, Vaʻa-o-Fonoti, and Gagaʻemauga	
309	Île Vanier	1,122.77	433.50	Canada	Nunavut	
310	Rowley Island	1,119.79	432.35	Canada	Nunavut	
311	Padang Island (Pulau Pandang)	1,118.43	431.83	Indonesia	Riau	
312	Martinique	1,113.42	429.89	France	Martinique	Overseas department
313	Nunaktuk Island	1,107.59	427.64	United States	Yukon–Kuskokwim Delta	
314	King Island	1,099.49	424.52	Australia	Tasmania	
315	Farwell Island	1,095.81	423.09		Antarctica	Located at 72°48′46″S 91°07′08″W, unnamed on map
316	Oleny Island (Oleniy Island)	1,072.71	414.18	Russia	Yamalo-Nenets Autonomous Okrug	
317	Sääminginsalo	1,069	413	Finland	South Savo	
318	Cameron Island	1,062.19	410.11	Canada	Nunavut	
319	Tahiti	1,051.29	405.91	France	French Polynesia	Overseas collectivity
320	Atka Island	1,049.05	405.04	United States	Alaska	
321	Cape Cod	1,047.33	404.38	United States	Massachusetts	Peninsula separated from continent by channel; USGS counts it as island
322	Hiiumaa	1,044.97	403.47	Estonia	Hiiu County (Hiiumaa)	
323	Serrano Island	1,034.93	399.59	Chile	Aysén Region	
324	Banks Island	1,034.18	399.30	Canada	British Columbia	
325	Grande Comore	1,018.61	393.29	Comoros	Grande Comore	
326	Mornington Island	1,017.90	393.01	Australia	Queensland	
327	Resolution Island	1,011.63	390.59	Canada	Nunavut	
328	Nagjuttuuq (Vansittart)	1,008.89	389.53	Canada	Nunavut	
329	Alexandra Land (Zemlya Aleksandry)	1,008.11	389.23	Russia	Arkhangelsk Oblast	

== Other areas of note ==
An island, with an area of 8,500 km^{2} (3,300 sq mi), is said to be formed by the Damietta and the Rosetta, two distributaries that flow into the Nile Delta in Egypt. At its given size it would be the 86th largest island.

The Ez Zeraf Game Reserve consists mainly of Zeraf Island, 8,000 km^{2} (3,100 sq mi), in South Sudan. It is a river island formed by the White Nile (Bahr el Jebel River) and its anabranch, the Bahr el Zeraf. At its given size it would be the 91st largest island.

The Camargue, 1,453 km^{2} (561 sq mi), in Provence-Alpes-Côte d'Azur, France is sometimes listed as an island. The Camargue would be the 268th largest island.

Zhongshan Island, 1,055 km^{2} (407 sq mi), is a river island in Guangdong, China. The status of the island is disputed by China. It would be 322nd largest.

== See also ==
- List of Antarctic and subantarctic islands
- List of countries and dependencies by area
- List of countries by largest island
- List of divided islands
- List of inhabited islands by area
- List of islands by highest point
- List of islands by name
- List of islands by population
- List of islands by population density
- Lists of islands
- Recursive islands and lakes

== Sources ==
- Haug, Per Ivar (August 2005). "Islands of Greenland". Gazetteer of Greenland. Norwegian University of Science and Technology. Archived from the original on 15 June 2011.
- "Islands by Land Area". Island Directory Tables. United Nations Environment Programme. 18 February 1998.
- "World Island Information". Joshua Calder's World Island Info. 2010. Archived from the original on 9 November 2025.
