= Air Force Island =

Uninhabited island in Nunavut, Canada

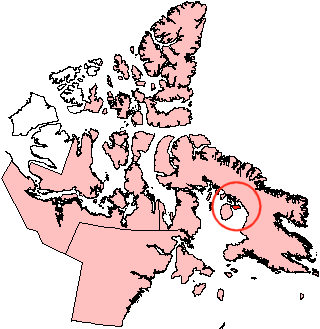
- Air Force Island, Nunavut

- Location within Nunavut Location within Canada

Geography
- Location: Foxe Basin
- Coordinates: 67°58′N 74°05′W
- Archipelago: Arctic Archipelago
- Area: 1,737.74 km^{2} (670.95 sq mi) (2026)
- Area rank: 37th in Canada & 230th worldwide

Administration
- Canada
- Territory: Nunavut
- Region: Qikiqtaaluk

Demographics
- Population: Uninhabited

Air Force Island is an uninhabited island in the Qikiqtaaluk Region of Nunavut, Canada. It is located along the southwestern coast of Baffin Island and measures 1,737.74 km^{2} (670.95 sq mi) in size making it the 37th largest island in Canada and the 230th worldwide. The first written record of the island's existence was in 1948, as were neighbouring Prince Charles Island and Foley Island, by a Royal Canadian Air Force (RCAF) crew member, Albert-Ernest Tomkinson, navigating an Avro Lancaster. The island was named in recognition of the RCAF's role in surveying the Arctic Archipelago.
