= Nagjuttuuq =

Uninhabited island in Nunavut, Canada

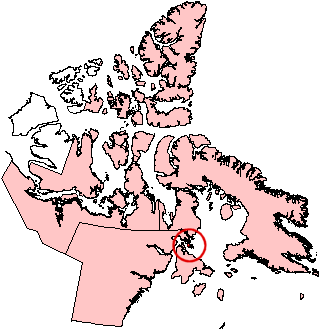
- Nagjuttuuq, Nunavut.

- Location within Nunavut Location within Canada

Geography
- Location: Foxe Basin
- Coordinates: 65°52′27″N 83°53′35″W
- Archipelago: Arctic Archipelago
- Area: 1,008.89 km^{2} (389.53 sq mi) (2026)
- Area rank: 51st in Canada & 326th worldwide

Administration
- Canada
- Nunavut: Nunavut
- Region: Kivalliq

Demographics
- Population: 0

Nagjuttuuq (Inuktitut syllabics: ᓇᒡᔪᑦᑑᖅ), formerly Vansittart Island, is one of the uninhabited island in the Arctic Archipelago. It is located in Foxe Basin, north of Southampton Island, in the Kivalliq Region, Nunavut, Canada, and has an area of 1,008.89 km^{2} (389.53 sq mi).
