= Mansel Island =

Island in Nunavut, Canada

Native name: Pujjunaq
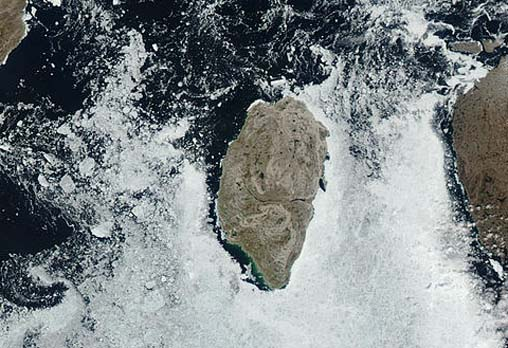
- Aqua MODIS satellite image of Mansel Island, Canada from July 2003.

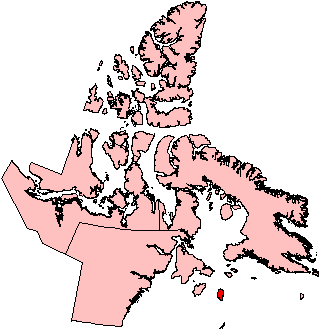
- Mansel Island, Nunavut

- Location within Nunavut Location within Canada

Geography
- Location: Hudson Bay
- Coordinates: 61°59′30″N 79°50′00″W
- Archipelago: Arctic Archipelago
- Area: 3,162.26 km^{2} (1,220.96 sq mi) (2026)
- Area rank: 28th in Canada & 159th worldwide

Administration
- Canada
- Territory: Nunavut
- Region: Qikiqtaaluk

Demographics
- Population: 0

Mansel Island (Note: Inuktitut: Pujjunaq) is a member of the Arctic Archipelago, is an uninhabited island in Qikiqtaaluk Region, Nunavut. It is located in Hudson Bay off Quebec's Ungava Peninsula. At 3,162.26 km^{2} (1,220.96 sq mi) in size, it is the 159th largest island in the world, and Canada's 28th largest island. Its topography features a gently undulating limestone lowland with elevations not exceeding 100 m (330 ft). Mansel Island was named in 1613 by Sir Thomas Button after Sir Robert Mansell, a vice-admiral in the Royal Navy.
