= Richards Island =

Uninhabited island in the Northwest Territories, Canada

- Location within Canada

Geography
- Location: Northern Canada
- Coordinates: 69°20′N 134°30′W
- Area: 1,728.47 km^{2} (667.37 sq mi) (2026)
- Area rank: 38th in Canada & 231st worldwide
- Length: 85 km (52.8 mi)
- Width: 42 km (26.1 mi)

Administration
- Canada
- Territory: Northwest Territories
- Region: Inuvik Region

Demographics
- Population: Uninhabited

Richards Island is one of the Canadian arctic islands within the Northwest Territories, Canada. The island has an area of 1,728.47 km^{2} (667.37 sq mi), being 85 km (53 mi) long and 42 km (26 mi) wide. Its eastern limit is marked by the main channel of the Mackenzie River, while its western limit is defined by the narrower Reindeer Channel. Richards Island was named by John Richardson in 1826 after the Governor of the Bank of England, John Baker Richards. The island, while desolate, is home to some major oil and gas sites. The nearest permanent settlement is Tuktoyaktuk, which lies 29 km (18 mi) to the east on the mainland.
