= Foley Island =

Uninhabited island off of Baffin Island

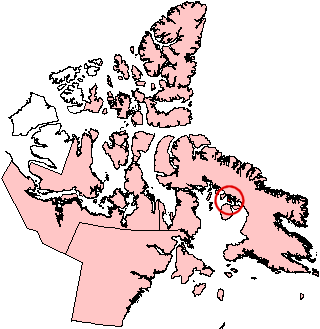
- Foley Island, Nunavut.

- Location within Nunavut Location within Canada

Geography
- Location: Foxe Basin
- Coordinates: 68°30′N 75°00′W
- Archipelago: Arctic Archipelago
- Area: 637 km^{2} (246 sq mi)

Administration
- Canada
- Nunavut: Nunavut
- Region: Qikiqtaaluk

Demographics
- Population: Uninhabited

Foley Island is a low-lying Canadian arctic island located in Nunavut, Canada. It is along the southern coast of Baffin Island in the Foxe Basin and measures 637 km^{2} (246 sq mi) in area. Foley Island is uninhabited.

The first written recording of the island's existence was in 1948, as were neighboring Prince Charles Island and Air Force Island, by a Royal Canadian Air Force crew member, Albert-Ernest Tomkinson, navigating an Avro Lancaster.
