= Ilha Grande de Gurupá =

Large island of the Amazon River delta

Ilha Grande do Gurupá
- Location within Pará Location within Brazil

Geography
- Location: Amazon River
- Coordinates: 1°0′S 51°30′W

Administration
- Brazil

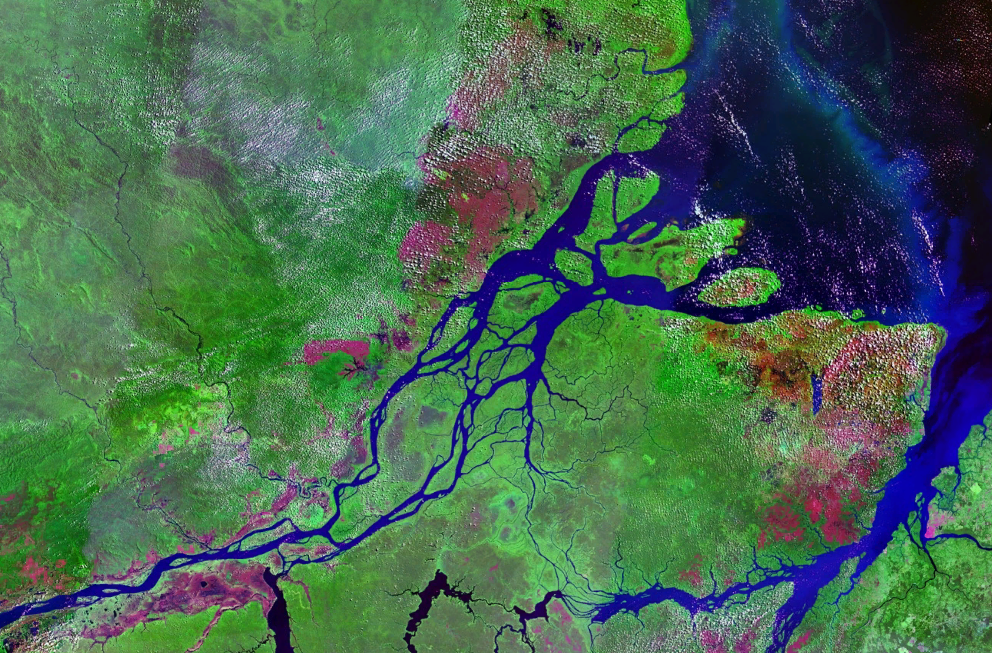
Satellite image of the Amazon River delta near Ilha Grande de Gurupá

Ilha Grande de Gurupá is a large river island of the Amazon River delta. It lies in the Brazilian state of Pará, west of Marajó and near the confluence of the Amazon and the Xingu. The island has an area of 4,864 square kilometres (1,878 sq mi).

This island is part of the Marajó Archipelago.
