= Nottingham Island =

Island in Nunavut, Canada

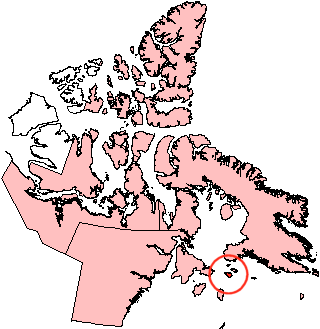
- Nottingham Island, Nunavut

- Location within Nunavut Location within Canada

Geography
- Location: Hudson Strait
- Coordinates: 63°17′N 77°55′W
- Area: 1,349.62 km^{2} (521.09 sq mi) (2026)
- Area rank: 42nd in Canada & 277th worldwide

Administration
- Canada
- Territory: Nunavut
- Region: Qikiqtaaluk

Demographics
- Population: Uninhabited

Nottingham Island (Inuktitut: Tujjaat) is an uninhabited island in the Qikiqtaaluk Region of Nunavut, Canada. It is located in Hudson Strait, just north of the entrance into Hudson Bay. The island is 1,349.62 km^{2} (521.09 sq mi) making it the 42nd largest island in Canada and the 277th worldwide.

== History ==
Nottingham Island was named by the English explorer Henry Hudson in 1610. A weather station was constructed on the island in 1884. In 1927, an airfield was constructed as part of a program to monitor ice in Hudson Bay. The island became uninhabited in October 1970 as Inuit residents migrated to larger towns, primarily Kinngait.

== Fauna ==
The island is known for its prominent walrus population.

== Notable residents ==
It is the birthplace of the late Inuk artist Pitseolak Ashoona as well as photographer Peter Pitseolak.
