= Prince Charles Island =

Uninhabited island, Nunavut, Canada

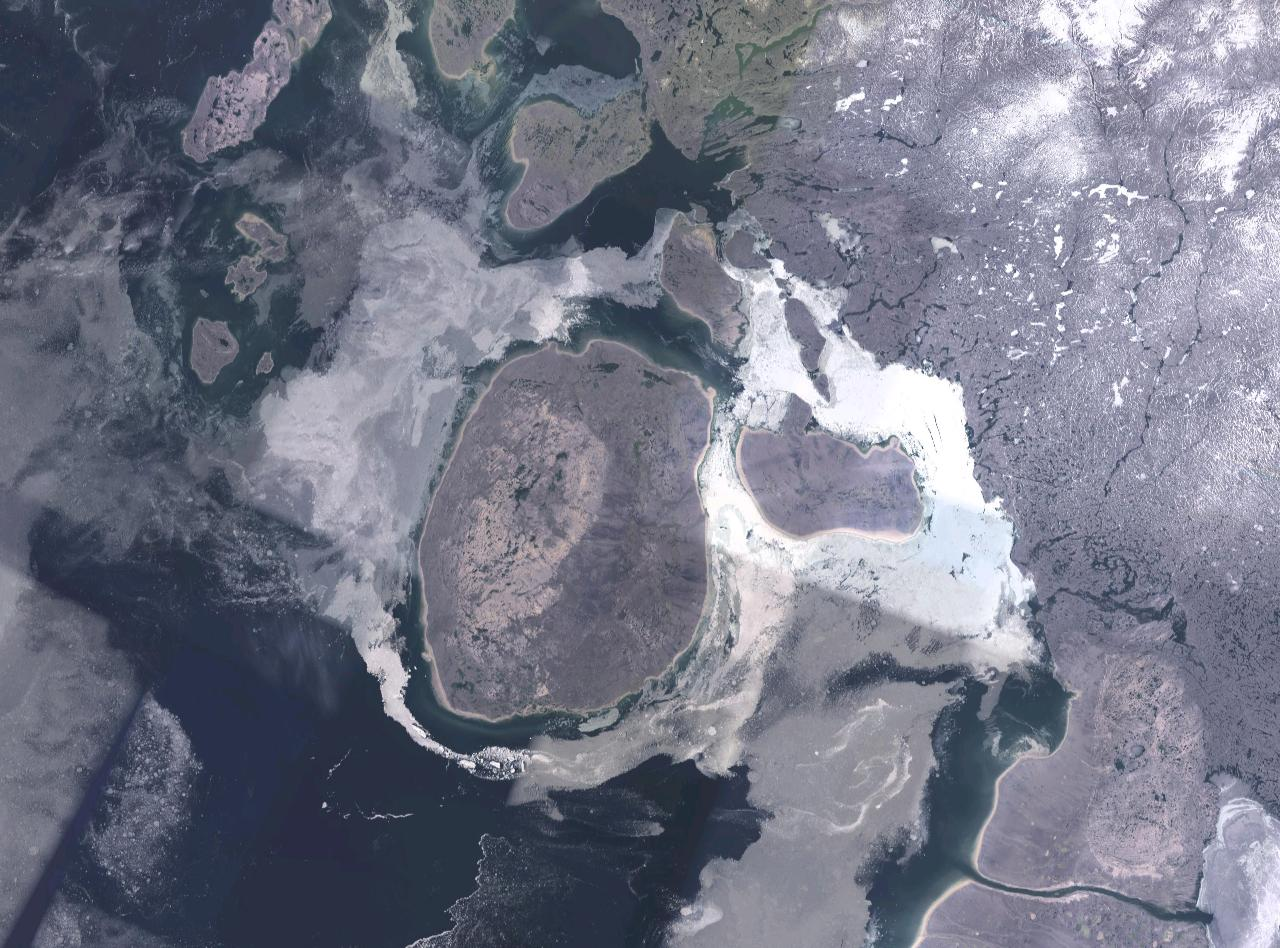
- NASA Landsat image of Prince Charles Island

- Location within Nunavut Location within Canada

Geography
- Location: Foxe Basin
- Coordinates: 67°47′N 76°12′W
- Area: 9,665.87 km^{2} (3,732.01 sq mi) (2026)
- Area rank: 19th in Canada & 78th worldwide
- Highest elevation: 73 m (240 ft)

Administration
- Canada
- Territory: Nunavut
- Region: Qikiqtaaluk

Demographics
- Population: Uninhabited

Prince Charles Island is a large, low-lying island in Canada. With an area of 9,665.87 km^{2} (3,732.01 sq mi), it is the world's 78th largest island and the 19th largest island in Canada. It is located in Foxe Basin, off the west coast of Baffin Island, in the Qikiqtaaluk Region of Nunavut, Canada. Though Prince Charles Island has no permanent residents, Inuit visited the island to hunt caribou; the island has no specific name in the Inuktitut language. Despite the island's size, it was not recorded by Western cartographers until 1932, when the tug captain W. A. Poole first sighted it. His information never made it onto any published map. It was rediscovered in 1948 by Albert-Ernest Tomkinson navigating an Avro Lancaster for the Royal Canadian Air Force (RCAF) 408 (Photo) Squadron. The island was named for British Prince Charles (later King Charles III), who was born in November the same year.

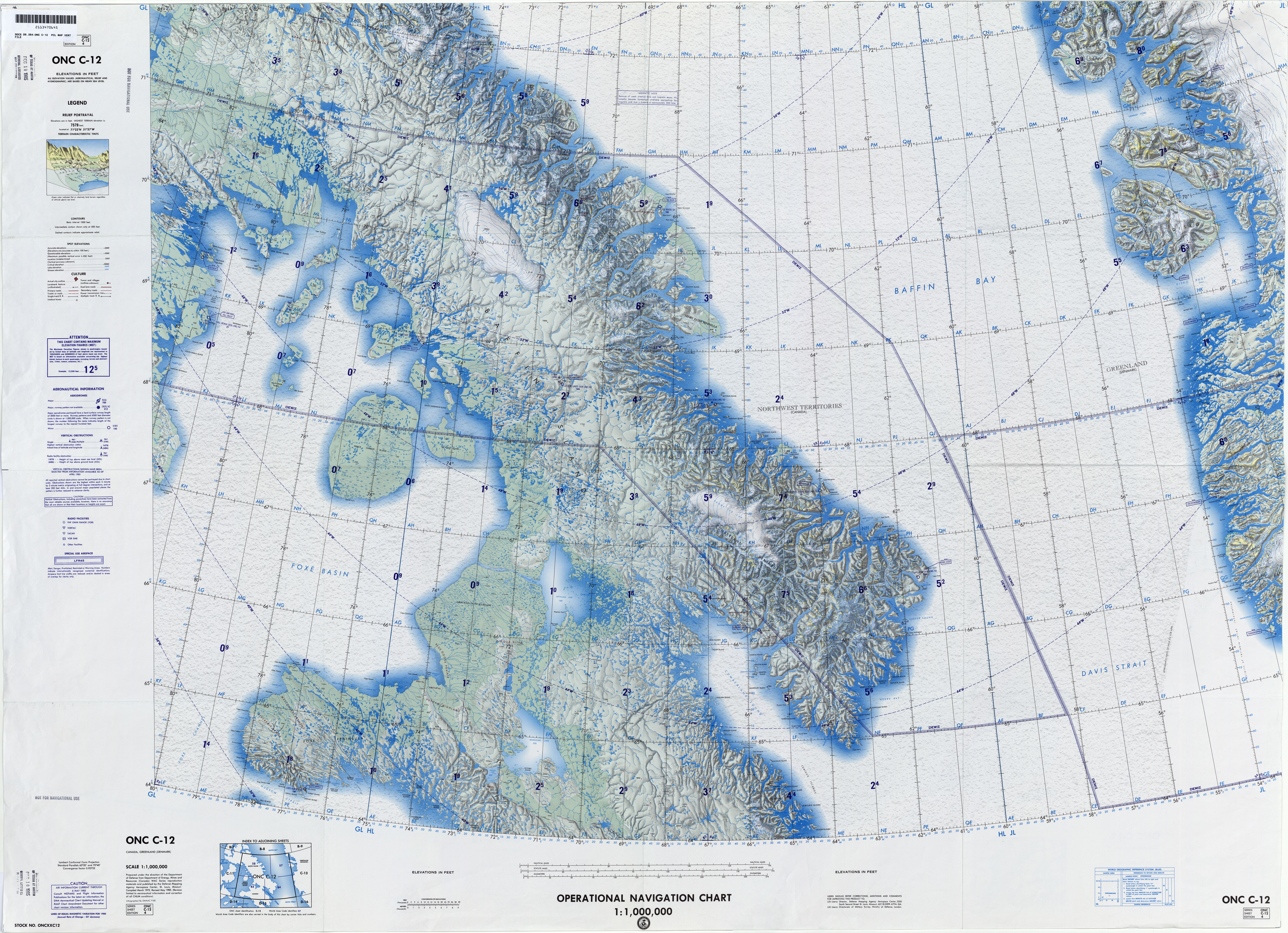
Map including Prince Charles Island

== See also ==
- Royal eponyms in Canada
