= Ungava Peninsula =

Region in Nunavik, Quebec

Native name: Péninsule d'Ungava ᐅᖓᕙ
- Location of the Ungava Peninsula

- Location within Quebec

Geography
- Location: Nunavik, Quebec
- Coordinates: 60°24′19″N 73°57′34″W
- Adjacent to: Arctic Ocean
- Area: 252,000 km^{2} (97,000 sq mi)

Administration
- Canada

Demographics
- Population: 12,000
- Ethnic groups: Inuit

The Ungava Peninsula (/ʊŋˈɡeɪvə, -ˈɡɑː-/), officially Péninsule d'Ungava (French pronunciation: [penɛ̃syl duŋɡava]), is the far northwestern part of the Labrador Peninsula of the province of Quebec, Canada. Bounded by Hudson Bay to the west, Hudson Strait to the north, and Ungava Bay to the east, it covers about 252,000 km^{2} (97,000 sq mi). Its northernmost point is Cape Wolstenholme, which is also the northernmost point of Quebec and any province of Canada. The peninsula is also part of the Canadian Shield, and consists entirely of treeless tundra dissected by large numbers of rivers and glacial lakes, flowing generally east–west in a parallel fashion. The peninsula was not deglaciated until 6,500 years ago (11,500 years after the Last Glacial Maximum) and is believed to have been the prehistoric centre from which the vast Laurentide Ice Sheet spread over most of North America during the last glacial epoch.

The Ungava Peninsula is part of the Nunavik proposed autonomous area of Quebec.

== Demographics ==
The Ungava Peninsula has an estimated population of 10,000 inhabitants. These are 90% Inuit, and live in 12 villages spread along the coast. The largest village, Kuujjuaq, is the capital of the Kativik Regional Government, which includes all of the peninsula. The peninsula's offshore islands are part of the Nunavut Territory. The region is accessible by air services, with links to southern Québec, and seasonal shipping when sea-ice breaks up. Thick permafrost prevents the use of conventional building techniques in some areas.

== Geology ==
The Ungava Peninsula is situated on the northeast portion of the Canadian Shield where the Rae Province connects with the Superior Province. The region is composed of Archean rocks (ca. 2.7–2.9 Ga) from the Douglas Harbour Domain (see Superior Craton). The Archean rocks are overlain by Paleoproterozoic supracrustal sequences (ca. 1.8–2.1 Ga) and intruded by Paleoproterozoic diabase dykes (ca. 2.0–2.2 Ga). The supracrustal rocks comprise nappes that form part of the Ungava and Labrador troughs. In the zone east of the Labrador Trough axis, the Paleoproterozoic deformation reworked the Archean rocks of the Douglas Harbour Domain, as well as the Paleoproterozoic diabase dykes. The metamorphic conditions which parallel the deformation increase from west to east and from middle amphibolite to granulite facies. U–Pb isotope analyses of zircon yield secondary ages around 1790 Ma. These results are interpreted as the age of metamorphism and indicate a reactivation of the northeastern margin of the Superior Province during a Paleoproterozoic tectono-metamorphic event, resulting from probable continental collision. (Madore, 2001). Pingualuit impact crater is located on the peninsula.

== Fauna ==
The Ungava brown bear, an extinct population of the grizzly bear, is named after this peninsula. It is also home to the Ungava seal, a subspecies of the Harbor seal.

== Climate ==
The climate is extremely cold (Dfc in the Köppen climate classification) because the Labrador Current keeps the region (and all of northern Québec) colder in the summer than other regions at comparable latitudes:

Climate data for Kuujjuaq (Kuujjuaq Airport) WMO ID: 71906; coordinates 58°06′N 68°25′W; elevation: 39.9 m (131 ft); 1991–2020 normals, extremes 1947–present
Month	Jan	Feb	Mar	Apr	May	Jun	Jul	Aug	Sep	Oct	Nov	Dec	Year
Record high humidex	5.0	6.3	11.7	17.9	27.5	38.9	37.9	33.2	32.2	20.4	10.3	5.8	38.9
Record high °C (°F)	5.6 (42.1)	7.8 (46.0)	12.1 (53.8)	19.2 (66.6)	31.1 (88.0)	33.1 (91.6)	34.3 (93.7)	30.7 (87.3)	28.3 (82.9)	20.0 (68.0)	10.2 (50.4)	8.3 (46.9)	34.3 (93.7)
Mean daily maximum °C (°F)	−18.9 (−2.0)	−18.1 (−0.6)	−11.3 (11.7)	−3.2 (26.2)	5.7 (42.3)	13.2 (55.8)	18.1 (64.6)	16.8 (62.2)	10.6 (51.1)	3.8 (38.8)	−3.9 (25.0)	−12.2 (10.0)	0.1 (32.2)
Daily mean °C (°F)	−23.3 (−9.9)	−23.1 (−9.6)	−16.9 (1.6)	−8.4 (16.9)	1.2 (34.2)	7.8 (46.0)	12.5 (54.5)	11.8 (53.2)	6.7 (44.1)	0.8 (33.4)	−7.2 (19.0)	−16.2 (2.8)	−4.5 (23.9)
Mean daily minimum °C (°F)	−27.7 (−17.9)	−28.0 (−18.4)	−22.5 (−8.5)	−13.4 (7.9)	−3.3 (26.1)	2.4 (36.3)	6.9 (44.4)	6.6 (43.9)	2.8 (37.0)	−2.1 (28.2)	−10.5 (13.1)	−20.2 (−4.4)	−9.1 (15.6)
Record low °C (°F)	−49.8 (−57.6)	−43.9 (−47.0)	−43.9 (−47.0)	−34.1 (−29.4)	−24.7 (−12.5)	−8.3 (17.1)	−1.6 (29.1)	−1.7 (28.9)	−7.8 (18.0)	−20.0 (−4.0)	−31.1 (−24.0)	−43.9 (−47.0)	−49.8 (−57.6)
Record low wind chill	−60.4	−58.0	−55.3	−45.6	−30.6	−13.2	−5.7	−6.5	−11.9	−32.9	−42.8	−56.3	−60.4
Average precipitation mm (inches)	30.7 (1.21)	29.3 (1.15)	31.6 (1.24)	27.4 (1.08)	31.5 (1.24)	51.1 (2.01)	75.2 (2.96)	75.9 (2.99)	87.8 (3.46)	57.0 (2.24)	43.8 (1.72)	36.9 (1.45)	578.2 (22.76)
Average rainfall mm (inches)	0.0 (0.0)	0.3 (0.01)	0.2 (0.01)	3.6 (0.14)	13.5 (0.53)	47.8 (1.88)	75.3 (2.96)	75.8 (2.98)	84.9 (3.34)	34.8 (1.37)	5.1 (0.20)	1.8 (0.07)	343.2 (13.51)
Average snowfall cm (inches)	30.6 (12.0)	29.2 (11.5)	31.6 (12.4)	23.3 (9.2)	18.3 (7.2)	4.3 (1.7)	0.0 (0.0)	0.0 (0.0)	2.9 (1.1)	21.3 (8.4)	38.9 (15.3)	35.1 (13.8)	235.4 (92.7)
Average precipitation days (≥ 0.2 mm)	15.7	12.9	14.8	12.0	12.5	13.3	15.6	18.3	19.9	18.3	17.6	15.5	186.1
Average rainy days (≥ 0.2 mm)	0.12	0.15	0.42	1.8	6.5	12.5	15.3	18.3	19.2	10.6	2.6	0.92	88.3
Average snowy days (≥ 0.2 cm)	15.6	12.9	14.7	10.9	8.2	2.5	0.04	0.08	1.9	11.1	16.9	19.2	109.8
Average relative humidity (%) (at 1500 LST)	66.2	61.3	61.9	65.1	62.8	58.9	59.3	63.6	68.0	73.5	77.7	73.4	66.0
Average dew point °C (°F)	−24.9 (−12.8)	−23.6 (−10.5)	−18.3 (−0.9)	−9.8 (14.4)	−2.1 (28.2)	2.7 (36.9)	7.1 (44.8)	7.0 (44.6)	2.4 (36.3)	−2.5 (27.5)	−9.2 (15.4)	−20.1 (−4.2)	−7.6 (18.3)
Mean monthly sunshine hours	62.7	108.3	163.8	197.2	137.8	180.1	197.2	166.6	99.1	48.8	51.7	53.5	1,467.2
Source: Environment and Climate Change Canada (sun 1951–1980) (dew point at 1300 LST 1951–1980) (July maximum)

== See also ==
- Akpatok Island
