= List of circles of latitude =

This article contains a list of the circles of latitude on Earth.

== Northern Hemisphere ==
- 90th parallel north, the North Pole
- 89 N
- 88 N
- 87 N
- 86 N
- 85 N
- 84 N
- 83 N
- 82 N
- 81 N
- 80 N
- 79 N
- 78 N
- 77 N
- 76 N
- 75 N
- 74 N
- 73 N
- 72 N
- 71 N
- 70 N
- 69 N
- 68 N
- 67 N
- 66°33′49.6″ north – Arctic Circle
- 66 N
- 65 N
- 64 N
- 63 N
- 62 N
- 61 N
- 60 N
- 59 N
- 58 N
- 57 N
- 56 N
- 55 N
- 54 N
- 53 N
- 52 N
- 51 N
- 50 N
- 49 N
- 48 N
- 47 N
- 46 N
- 45 N
- 44 N
- 43 N
- 42 N
- 41 N
- 40 N
- 39 N
- 38 N
- 37 N
- 36 N
- 35 N
- 34 N
- 33 N
- 32 N
- 31 N
- 30 N
- 29 N
- 28 N
- 27 N
- 26 N
- 25 N
- 24 N
- 23°26′10.4″ – Tropic of Cancer
- 23 N
- 22 N
- 21 N
- 20 N
- 19 N
- 18 N
- 17 N
- 16 N
- 15 N
- 14 N
- 13 N
- 12 N
- 11 N
- 10 N
- 9 N
- 8 N
- 7 N
- 6 N
- 5 N
- 4 N
- 3 N
- 2 N
- 1 N

== Equator ==
The equator, a circle of latitude that divides a spheroid, such as Earth, into the northern and southern hemispheres. On Earth, it is an imaginary line located at 0 degrees latitude.

Equator

== Southern Hemisphere ==
- 1 S
- 2 S
- 3 S
- 4 S
- 5 S
- 6 S
- 7 S
- 8 S
- 9 S
- 10 S
- 11 S
- 12 S
- 13 S
- 14 S
- 15 S
- 16 S
- 17 S
- 18 S
- 19 S
- 20 S
- 21 S
- 22 S
- 23 S
- 23°26′10.4″ south – Tropic of Capricorn
- 24 S
- 25 S
- 26 S
- 27 S
- 28 S
- 29 S
- 30 S
- 31 S
- 32 S
- 33 S
- 34 S
- 35 S
- 36 S
- 37 S
- 38 S
- 39 S
- 40 S
- 41 S
- 42 S
- 43 S
- 44 S
- 45 S
- 46 S
- 47 S
- 48 S
- 49 S
- 50 S
- 51 S
- 52 S
- 53 S
- 54 S
- 55 S
- 56 S
- 57 S
- 58 S
- 59 S
- 60 S
- 61 S
- 62 S
- 63 S
- 64 S
- 65 S
- 66 S
- 66°33′49.6″ south – Antarctic Circle
- 67 S
- 68 S
- 69 S
- 70 S
- 71 S
- 72 S
- 73 S
- 74 S
- 75 S
- 76 S
- 77 S
- 78 S
- 79 S
- 80 S
- 81 S
- 82 S
- 83 S
- 84 S
- 85 S
- 86 S
- 87 S
- 88 S
- 89 S
- 90th parallel south, the South Pole
