= Hydrography of Chile =

Chile Hydrography

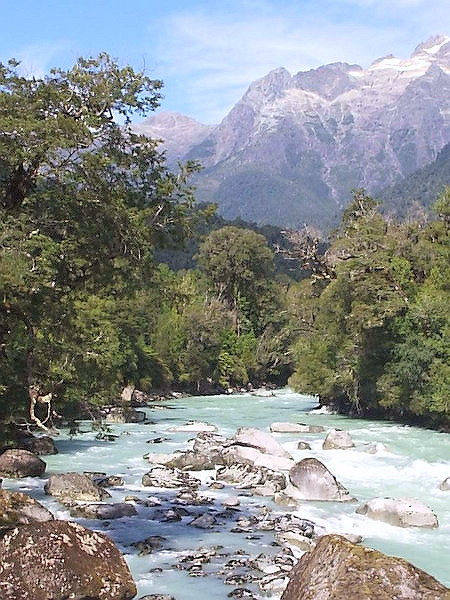
Río Blanco, in the Aysén Region.

The hydrography of Chile refers to distribution of surface water in Chile. Due to its varied geography, the country's hydrographic systems cover several ecosystems and climatic zones, which influence factors such as the flow rate.

== Hydrographic Zones ==
According to a partition of climatic zones presented by the Economic Commission for Latin America and the Caribbean (ECLAC), Chilean hydrography can be classified into four zones:

- Dry Pacific Hydrographic System
- Altiplanic (Highland) Basins
- Central Chile Hydrographic System
- South Pacific Hydrographic System

=== Dry Pacific Hydrographic System ===
Covering an area of 290,578 km^{2}, the Dry Pacific Hydrographic System includes Chile's Norte Grande and Norte Chico regions, extending from the 18th parallel south to the Limarí River basin at 31st parallel south. It is bounded to the east by the Andean hydrological divide. It encompasses coastal desert landscapes, and features valleys with short, low-flow rivers that can carry significant volumes of water during summers when there is rainfall in the highlands.

=== Altiplanic (Highland) Basins ===
The Altiplanic (Highland) Basins cover an area of 10,459 km^{2} in the Chilean highlands. The area consists of Chile's endorheic basins, as well as Chile's sections of the Titicaca–Desaguadero–Poopó–Salar de Coipasa endorheic system, which extends across Bolivia, Chile, and Peru.

=== Central Chile Hydrographic System ===
The Central Chile Hydrographic System extends from the 31st parallel south at the Choapa River basin to the 37th parallel south at the Biobío River basin. Covering 133,997 km^{2}, it is characterised by steep terrain and short rivers that generally flow to the sea. The climate varies from mountainous conditions in the Andes to more temperate climates along the Chilean coast. In the longitudinal valley, conditions are drier in the north and become more temperate toward the south. The Pacific Islands are included in this system.

=== South Pacific Hydrographic System ===
The South Pacific Hydrographic System covers 376,051 km^{2}, extending from the Imperial River basin at the 37th parallel south to Cape Horn at the 56th parallel south. In this area, Chile and Argentina share watersheds that extended across both sides of the border and, depending on the basin, drain either into the Pacific Ocean or the Atlantic Ocean.

== Shared Basins ==
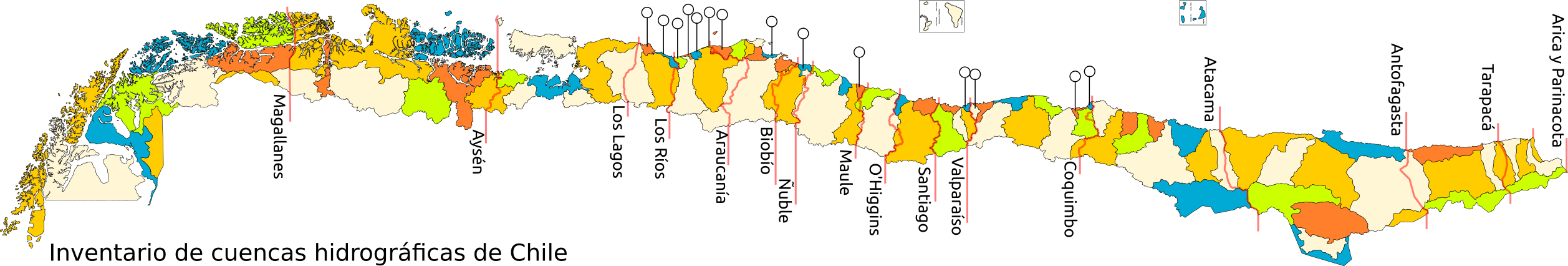
A map depicting Chilean cuencas (basins or watersheds).

Chile shares a total of 58 basins with neighbouring countries, which are divided as follows:

- 40 shared basins with Argentina
- 7 shared basins with Bolivia
- 1 shared basin with both Argentina and Bolivia
- 3 shared basins with Peru
- 7 shared basins with both Bolivia and Peru

== Precipitation ==
Precipitation patterns with respect to Chilean hydrography is subject to temporal and spatial variations. Around the 25th parallel south, rainfall reaches a minimum, with virtually no precipitation along the coast and about 100 mm annually in the mountains. By contrast, around 7,000 mm per year is recorded along the coast around the 47th parallel south.

The Dry Pacific Hydrographic System region receives very little rainfall. Coastal areas are influenced by the Camanchaca, while inland zones are almost entirely dry. However, above 3,000 metres above sea level, the summer heat in the mountains promotes precipitation associated with the highland winter. On the other hand, the Central Chile Hydrographic System region receives considerable precipitation between May and August, with rainfall amounts increasing progressively toward the south. Finally, the South Pacific Hydrographic System region experiences rainfall throughout the year, with peak precipitation occurring between May and July.

== River Regime ==
River regime refers to the origin of the waters a river carries. This differs by region in Chile:

- The far north (regions of Arica and Parinacota, Tarapacá, and Antofagasta) experiences extreme aridity and strong daily temperature variations. Highland rains create variability in river flows, giving rivers a predominantly rainy regime. Conditions are so harsh that only the Loa River maintains continuous flow throughout the year.
- The near north (regions of Atacama and Coquimbo) has irregular rainfall and semi-arid conditions, resulting in a mixed feeding regime. Rivers receive runoff from mountain rainfall combined with occasional precipitation along their courses. Abundant aquifers in this region support agriculture, human settlements, and other activities.
- Central Chilean rivers, from the Aconcagua River to the Chacao Channel, exhibit a mixed regime, which can be divided into two zones. The first set of rivers, from the Aconcagua to the Imperial River, are torrential with a permanent mixed regime, fed by both rain and snowmelt. Peak flows occur twice a year, during the main rainy season (June and July), as well as the spring snowmelt. The second set of rivers, from the Imperial River to the Chacao Channel, are calmer, with flows regulated by numerous lakes throughout the area.
- In Southern Chile, from the Reloncaví Sound southward, river behavior varies according to the slopes of the Andes. The Western slope is characterised by short, abundant rivers with rapid runoff dominated by snowmelt and intense rainfall, often producing violent floods. On the other hand, the Eastern slope has reduced rainfall, which leads to calmer rivers originating in lower parts of the Andes with smaller flows.

== Surface Runoff ==
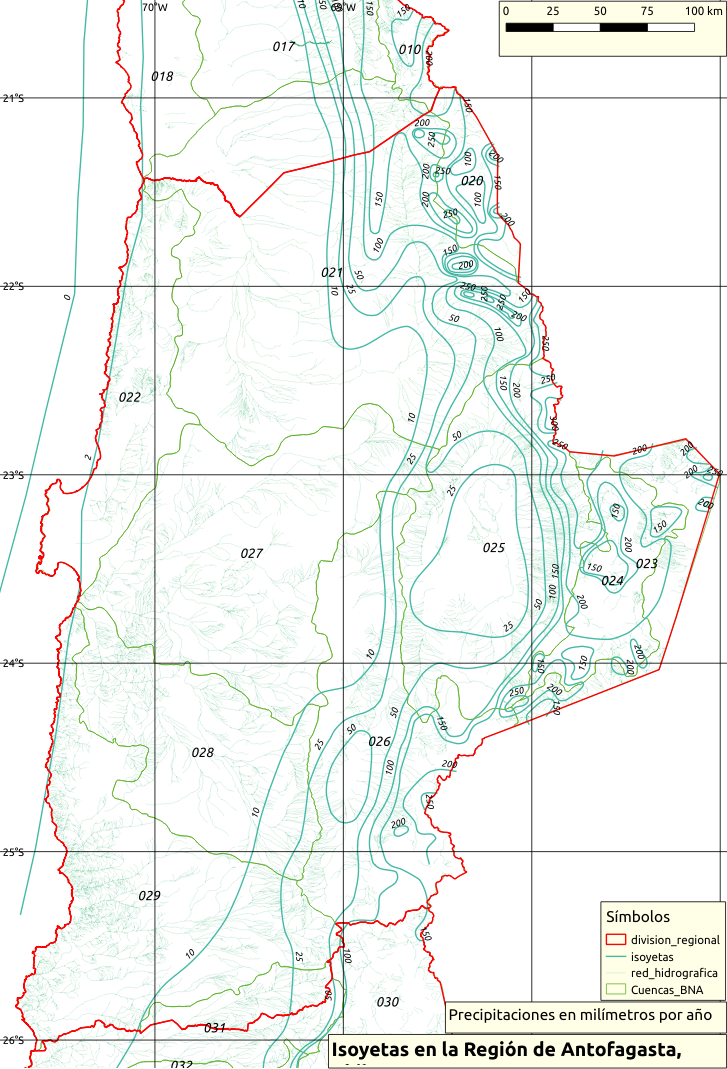
The watersheds of the Antofagasta region.

In the Dry Pacific Hydrographic System, evapotranspiration isolines generally align with isohyets both along the coast and inland. Only in the Andes, above 4,000 meters above sea level, is there a rainfall surplus exceeding evapotranspiration, ranging from 150 to 250 mm per year. Further south, on the high plateau, maximum annual precipitation reaches 500 mm, while evapotranspiration remains around 300 mm.

Based on surface runoff characteristics, Chile can be divided into three types of drainage areas depending on where the waters ultimately flow:

- Arreic areas: Located in the northern part of the country, these basins lack permanent surface watercourses or only have sporadic flows. In these regions, runoff is absorbed by the extensive desert areas.
- Endorheic areas: Also in northern Chile, mainly between the Dry Pacific Hydrographic System and Altiplanic (Highland) Regions, these basins retain runoff internally without reaching the sea. Sporadic flows are stored in central depressions such as salt flats or lagoons. Notable examples include Chungará Lake and the Atacama Salt Flat.
- Exorheic areas: The most common drainage type in Chile, these basins receive precipitation and channel water toward the sea. Examples include the Loa, Maipo, Maule, and Palena River basins.

== Wetlands ==
As of December 2022, there were sixteen wetlands of international importance in Chile, as recognised by Ramsar, with a total area of 361,760 hectares.

== Glaciers ==
In the Patagonian Andes, vast ice masses known as ice fields contain the largest freshwater reserves in the Southern Hemisphere, second only to Antarctica. The region is also home to some of the longest glaciers, including the Pío XI (or Brüggen) Glacier, among many others.
