= 63rd parallel =

63rd parallel may refer to:

- 63rd parallel north, a circle of latitude in the Northern Hemisphere
- 63rd parallel south, a circle of latitude in the Southern Hemisphere
