= 61st parallel =

61st parallel may refer to:

- 61st parallel north, a circle of latitude in the Northern Hemisphere
- 61st parallel south, a circle of latitude in the Southern Hemisphere
