= 65th parallel =

65th parallel may refer to:

- 65th parallel north, a circle of latitude in the Northern Hemisphere
- 65th parallel south, a circle of latitude in the Southern Hemisphere
