= 34th parallel =

34th parallel may refer to:

- 34th parallel north, a circle of latitude in the Northern Hemisphere
- 34th parallel south, a circle of latitude in the Southern Hemisphere
