= 35th parallel =

35th parallel may refer to:

- 35th parallel north, a circle of latitude in the Northern Hemisphere
- 35th parallel south, a circle of latitude in the Southern Hemisphere
