= 64th parallel =

64th parallel may refer to:

- 64th parallel north, a circle of latitude in the Northern Hemisphere
- 64th parallel south, a circle of latitude in the Southern Hemisphere
