= 31st parallel =

31st parallel may refer to:

- 31st parallel north, a circle of latitude in the Northern Hemisphere
- 31st parallel south, a circle of latitude in the Southern Hemisphere
