= 33rd parallel =

33rd parallel may refer to:

- 33rd parallel north, a circle of latitude in the Northern Hemisphere
- 33rd parallel south, a circle of latitude in the Southern Hemisphere
