= 32nd parallel =

32nd parallel may refer to:

- 32nd parallel north, a circle of latitude in the Northern Hemisphere
- 32nd parallel south, a circle of latitude in the Southern Hemisphere
