= 62nd parallel =

62nd parallel may refer to:

- 62nd parallel north, a circle of latitude in the Northern Hemisphere
- 62nd parallel south, a circle of latitude in the Southern Hemisphere
