= 87th parallel =

87th parallel may refer to:

- 87th parallel north, a circle of latitude in the Northern Hemisphere, in the Arctic Ocean
- 87th parallel south, a circle of latitude in the Southern Hemisphere, in Antarctica
