= 37th parallel =

37th parallel may refer to:

- 37th parallel north, a circle of latitude in the Northern Hemisphere
- 37th parallel south, a circle of latitude in the Southern Hemisphere
