= 52nd parallel =

52nd parallel may refer to:

- 52nd parallel north, a circle of latitude in the Northern Hemisphere
- 52nd parallel south, a circle of latitude in the Southern Hemisphere
