= 54th parallel =

54th parallel may refer to:

- 54th parallel north, a circle of latitude in the Northern Hemisphere
- 54th parallel south, a circle of latitude in the Southern Hemisphere
