= 89th parallel =

89th parallel may refer to:

- 89th parallel north, a circle of latitude in the Northern Hemisphere, in the Arctic Ocean
- 89th parallel south, a circle of latitude in the Southern Hemisphere, in Antarctica
