= 40th parallel =

40th parallel may refer to:

- 40th parallel north, a circle of latitude in the Northern Hemisphere
- 40th parallel south, a circle of latitude in the Southern Hemisphere
