= 36th parallel =

36th parallel may refer to:

- 36th parallel north, a circle of latitude in the Northern Hemisphere
- 36th parallel south, a circle of latitude in the Southern Hemisphere
