= 39th parallel =

39th parallel may refer to:

- 39th parallel north, a circle of latitude in the Northern Hemisphere
- 39th parallel south, a circle of latitude in the Southern Hemisphere
