= 51st parallel =

51st parallel may refer to:

- 51st parallel north, a circle of latitude in the Northern Hemisphere
- 51st parallel south, a circle of latitude in the Southern Hemisphere
