= 86th parallel =

86th parallel may refer to:

- 86th parallel north, a circle of latitude in the Northern Hemisphere, in the Arctic Ocean
- 86th parallel south, a circle of latitude in the Southern Hemisphere, in Antarctica
