= 88th parallel =

88th parallel may refer to:

- 88th parallel north, a circle of latitude in the Northern Hemisphere, in the Arctic Ocean
- 88th parallel south, a circle of latitude in the Southern Hemisphere, in Antarctica
