= 53rd parallel =

53rd parallel may refer to:

- 53rd parallel north, a circle of latitude in the Northern Hemisphere
- 53rd parallel south, a circle of latitude in the Southern Hemisphere
