= 60th parallel south =

Circle of latitude

60th parallel south

The 60th parallel south is a circle of latitude that is 60 degrees south of Earth's equatorial plane. No land lies on the parallel—it crosses nothing but ocean. The closest land is a group of rocks north of Coronation Island (Melson Rocks or Governor Islands) of the South Orkney Islands, which are about 54 km south of the parallel, and Thule Island and Cook Island of the South Sandwich Islands, which both are about 57 km north of the parallel (with Cook Island slightly closer).

The parallel marks the northern limit of the Southern Ocean (though some organisations and countries, notably Australia, have other definitions) and of the Antarctic Treaty System. It also marks the southern boundary of the South Pacific Nuclear-Weapon-Free Zone and the Latin American Nuclear-Weapon-Free Zone.

At this latitude the sun is visible for 18 hours, 52 minutes during the December solstice and 5 hours, 52 minutes during the June solstice. On December 21, the sun is at 53.44 degrees up in the sky and 6.56 degrees on June 21. The sun's altitude is exactly 30 degrees at either equinox.

The latitudes south of this parallel are often referred to as the Screaming 60s due to the prevailing high-speed, westerly winds which can generate large waves in excess of 15 m (50 ft) and peak wind speeds over 145 km/h (90 mph).

The maximum altitude of the Sun is > 15.00º in April and > 8.00º in May.

The lowest latitude where white nights can be observed is approximately on this parallel. White nights in the 60th parallel south occur around the December Solstice (Summer Solstice in the Southern Hemisphere).

During the summer solstice, nighttime does not get beyond nautical twilight, a condition which lasts throughout the month of December. It is possible to view both astronomical dawn and dusk every day between February 17 and October 24.

== Around the world ==
Starting at the prime meridian and heading eastwards, the parallel 60° south passes through:

| Coordinates | Ocean | Notes |
|---|---|---|
| 60°0′S 0°0′E | The Prime Meridian | |
| 60°0′S 20°0′E | the boundary of the Atlantic and Indian Oceans | |
| 60°0′S 147°0′E | the boundary of the Indian and Pacific Oceans | Additionally passes through the Pacific Ocean at the Drake Passage between South America and the Antarctic Peninsula |
| 60°0′S 67°16′W | the boundary of the Pacific and Atlantic Oceans | Running close to the southern border of the Scotia Sea and the South Orkney Islands, South Georgia and the South Sandwich Islands (claimed by Argentina) |

== See also ==
- 59th parallel south
- 61st parallel south
