= Takiseeq =

Uninhabited island in Greenland

- Interactive map of Takiseeq

Geography
- Location: Sermersooq municipality
- Coordinates: 65°29′0″N 39°6′0″W
- Area: 21.515 km^{2} (8.307 sq mi)
- Coastline: 45.6 km (28.33 mi)
- Highest elevation: 141 m (463 ft)
- Highest point: 243 m (797 ft)

Demographics
- Population: 0 (2021)
- Pop. density: 0/km^{2} (0/sq mi)
- Languages: Greenlandic

Takiseeq, also referred as Takisêq, Takisek, and Takisseq is a small uninhabited polar island in the Sermersooq municipality of southeastern Greenland in the Kingdom of Denmark.

== Geography ==
The island has an area of 21.5 square kilometers (abbreviated as km^{2}) and a shoreline of 45.6 kilometers (often shortened as km). The island's coordinates is 65° 29' 0" north and 39° 6' 0" west.

The island is in the continent of North America, and is located on the North American Plate.

=== Climate ===
The island's climate is a tundra, and it has extremely cold weather and temperatures. The island has long winters, and short cold summers, with short growing seasons.

=== Topography ===
The island is mostly made of small hills, and it has an average elevation of 141 meters (463 feet). The highest point on the island is measured to be 243 meters (797 feet) above sea level.

=== Wildlife ===
Due to the island's harsh weather, it has little wildlife, which is mostly herbaceous cover that consists of grasses, herbs, and ferns.

Approximately 24% or 1/4 of the island is covered in trees, despite trees being extremely rare in Greenland.

=== Population ===
The population of Takiseeq is 0, with no human settlements located on the island.

The used currency in Takiseeq is the Krone, which is the standard currency of Greenland, and the rest of Scandinavia.

== See also ==
- Sermersooq, the municipality where Takiseeq is located.
