= George V Land =

Australian Antarctic claim

Location of George V Land (red), Australian Antarctic Territory in Antarctica

George V Land is a segment of Antarctica part of the land claimed as part of the Australian Antarctic Territory, inland from the George V Coast. As with other segments of Antarctica, it is defined by two lines of longitude, 142°02' E and 153°45' E, and by the 60°S parallel.

== History ==
=== Australasian Antarctic Exploration ===
This region was first explored by members of the Main Base party of the Australasian Antarctic Expedition (1911–14) under Douglas Mawson, who named this feature for King George V of Australia. This expedition covered over 6400 km (~4000 miles) of uncharted land.

Tragically, Belgrave Ninnis and Xavier Mertz, two members of the expedition, died. In December 1912, Mawson, along with Ninnis and Mertz, trekked over 500 km (~311 miles) from base camp, in an attempt to explore as much uncharted land as possible. During the journey, Ninnis (was believed to have) fell into a crevasse, and Mertz later fell ill and died in his sleep, forcing Mawson to trudge on for 30 days to return to base camp alone.

=== British Australian and New Zealand Antarctic Research Exploration (BANZARE) ===
The British Australian and New Zealand Antarctic Research Expedition (BANZARE), from 1929 to 1931- also led by Douglas Mawson- claimed George V Land for King George V and mapped out the whole Antarctic coastline from 45°E to 160°E, including George V Land, establishing the boundaries for the Australian Antarctic Territory, minus a sliver of French territory.

== Studies Conducted in George V Land ==
- Cenozoic deformation in the George V Land continental margin (East Antarctica)
- Heterogeneous Basal Thermal Conditions Underpinning the Adélie-George V Coast, East Antarctica
- Hidden Tunnel Valleys of the Past: early glacial insights from George V Basin, East Antarctica
- Seafloor morphology and acoustic facies of the George V Land shelf
- Well-log Integration and Seismic-to-well tie off George V Land (Antarctica)
