= Circle of latitude =

Geographic notion

The Mercator projection of a world map. The angles are untrue for area, especially at high latitudes. Also note increasing distances between the latitudes towards the poles and the parallel lines of longitude. The only true world map is the globe. The Mercator projection comes from a globe inside a cylinder.

The Mercator projection and its use on a world map. This projection first came into use in the 16th century by the Dutch.

A circle of latitude or line of latitude on Earth is an abstract east–west small circle connecting all locations around Earth (ignoring elevation) at a given latitude coordinate line.

Circles of latitude are often called parallels because they are parallel to each other; that is, planes that contain any of these circles never intersect each other. A location's position along a circle of latitude is given by its longitude. Circles of latitude are unlike circles of longitude, which are all great circles with the centre of Earth in the middle, as the circles of latitude get smaller as the distance from the Equator increases. Their length can be calculated by a common sine or cosine function. For example, the 60th parallel north or south is half as long as the Equator (disregarding Earth's minor flattening by 0.335%), stemming from $\cos(60^{\circ}) = 0.5$. On the Mercator projection or on the Gall-Peters projection, a circle of latitude is perpendicular to all meridians. On the ellipsoid or on spherical projection, all circles of latitude are rhumb lines, except the Equator.

The latitude of the circle is approximately the angle between the Equator and the circle, with the angle's vertex at Earth's centre. The Equator is at 0°, and the North Pole and South Pole are at 90° north and 90° south, respectively. The Equator is the longest circle of latitude and is the only circle of latitude which also is a great circle. As such, it is perpendicular to all meridians.

There are 89 integral (whole degree) circles of latitude between the Equator and the poles in each hemisphere, but these can be divided into more precise measurements of latitude, and are often represented as a decimal degree (e.g. 34.637° N) or with minutes and seconds (e.g. 22°14′26″ S).

On a map, the circles of latitude may or may not be parallel, and their spacing may vary, depending on which projection is used to map the surface of the Earth onto a plane. On an equirectangular projection, centered on the equator, the circles of latitude are horizontal, parallel, and equally spaced. On other cylindrical and pseudocylindrical projections, the circles of latitude are horizontal and parallel, but may be spaced unevenly to give the map useful characteristics. For instance, on a Mercator projection the circles of latitude are more widely spaced near the poles to preserve local scales and shapes, while on a Gall–Peters projection the circles of latitude are spaced more closely near the poles so that comparisons of area will be accurate. On most non-cylindrical and non-pseudocylindrical projections, the circles of latitude are neither straight nor parallel.

Arcs of circles of latitude are sometimes used as boundaries between countries or regions where distinctive natural borders are lacking (such as in deserts), or when an artificial border is drawn as a "line on a map". North American nations and states have also mostly been created by straight lines, which are often parts of circles of latitudes. For instance, the northern border of Colorado is at 41° N while the southern border is at 37° N. Roughly half the length of the border between the United States and Canada follows 49° N.

== Major circles of latitude ==
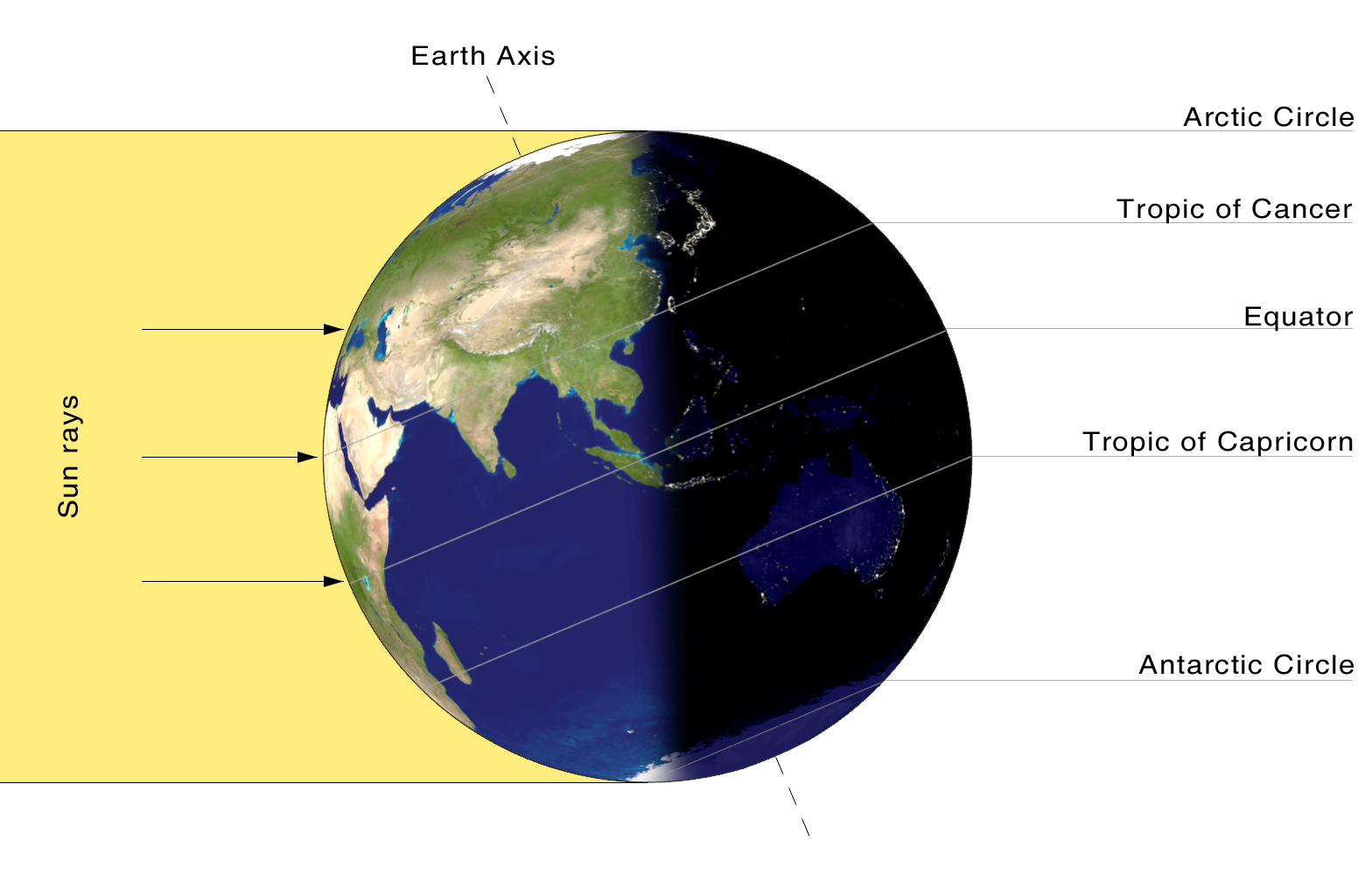
Diagram showing the derivation of the major circles of latitude on the Earth.

Relationship of Earth's axial tilt (ε) to the tropical and polar circles

There are five major circles of latitude, (or seven if the poles are counted as degenerate circles) listed below from north to south. The position of the Equator is fixed (90 degrees from Earth's axis of rotation) but the latitudes of the other circles depend on the tilt of this axis relative to the plane of Earth's orbit, and so are not perfectly fixed. The values below are for 21 September 2026:

- Arctic Circle (66°33′51.1″ N)
- Tropic of Cancer (23°26′08.9″ N)
- Equator (0° latitude)
- Tropic of Capricorn (23°26′08.9″ S)
- Antarctic Circle (66°33′51.1″ S)

The five major circles of latitude shown on an equirectangular projection of Earth.

These circles of latitude, excluding the Equator, mark the divisions between the five principal geographical zones.

=== Equator ===
The equator is the circle that is equidistant from the North Pole and South Pole. It divides the Earth into the Northern Hemisphere and the Southern Hemisphere. Of the parallels or circles of latitude, it is the longest, and the only 'great circle' (a circle on the surface of the Earth, centered on Earth's center). All the other parallels are smaller and centered only on Earth's axis.

Equator

=== Polar circles ===
The Arctic Circle is the southernmost latitude in the Northern Hemisphere at which the Sun can remain continuously above or below the horizon for 24 hours (at the June and December solstices respectively). Similarly, the Antarctic Circle marks the northernmost latitude in the Southern Hemisphere at which the Sun can remain continuously above or below the horizon for 24 hours (at the December and June Solstices respectively).

The latitude of the polar circles is equal to 90° minus the Earth's axial tilt.

Arctic Circle	Antarctic Circle

=== Tropical circles ===
The Tropic of Cancer and Tropic of Capricorn mark the northernmost and southernmost latitudes at which the Sun may be seen directly overhead at the June solstice and December solstice respectively.

The latitude of the tropical circles is equal to the Earth's axial tilt.

Tropic of Cancer	Tropic of Capricorn

=== Movement of the Tropical and Polar Circles ===
By definition, the positions of the Tropic of Cancer, Tropic of Capricorn, Arctic Circle and Antarctic Circle all depend on the tilt of the Earth's axis relative to the plane of its orbit around the Sun (the "obliquity of the ecliptic"). If the Earth were "upright" (its axis at right angles to the orbital plane) there would be no Arctic, Antarctic, or Tropical circles: at the poles the Sun would always circle along the horizon, and at the equator the Sun would always rise due east, pass directly overhead, and set due west.

The positions of the Tropical and Polar Circles are not fixed because the axial tilt changes slowly – a complex motion determined by the superimposition of many different cycles (some of which are described below) with short to very long periods. At noon of January 1st 2000 AD, the mean value of the tilt was 23° 26′ 21.406″ (according to IAU 2006, theory P03), the corresponding value being 23° 26′ 10.633″ at noon of January 1st 2023 AD.

The main long-term cycle causes the axial tilt to fluctuate between about 22.1° and 24.5° with a period of 41,000 years. Currently, the average value of the tilt is decreasing by about 0.468″ per year. As a result (approximately, and on average), the Tropical Circles are drifting towards the equator (and the Polar Circles towards the poles) by 15 m per year, and the area of the Tropics, defined astronomically, is decreasing by 1,100 km^{2} (420 sq mi) per year. (However, the tropical belt as defined based on atmospheric conditions is expanding due to global warming.)

The Earth's axial tilt has additional shorter-term variations due to nutation, of which the main term, with a period of 18.6 years, has an amplitude of 9.2″ (corresponding to almost 300 m north and south). There are many smaller terms, resulting in varying daily shifts of some metres in any direction.

Finally, the Earth's rotational axis is not exactly fixed in the Earth, but undergoes small fluctuations (on the order of 15 m) called polar motion, which have a small effect on the Tropics and Polar Circles and also on the Equator.

Short-term fluctuations over a matter of days do not directly affect the location of the extreme latitudes at which the Sun may appear directly overhead, or at which 24-hour day or night is possible, except when they actually occur at the time of the solstices. Rather, they cause a theoretical shifting of the parallels, that would occur if the given axis tilt were maintained throughout the year.

==== Other planets ====
These circles of latitude can be defined on other planets with axial inclinations relative to their orbital planes. Objects such as Pluto with tilt angles greater than 45 degrees will have the tropic circles closer to the poles and the polar circles closer to the equator.

== Other notable parallels ==
A number of sub-national and international borders were intended to be defined by, or are approximated by, parallels. Parallels make convenient borders in the northern hemisphere because astronomic latitude can be roughly measured (to within a few tens of metres) by sighting the North Star.

Parallel	Description
81°N	In Svalbard, Norway, the northern and southern limits of the area comprised by the Svalbard Treaty of 9 February 1920.
74°N	In Svalbard, Norway, the northern and southern limits of the area comprised by the Svalbard Treaty of 9 February 1920.
70°N	On Victoria Island, Canada, two sections of the border between Northwest Territories and Nunavut.
60°N	In Canada, the southern border of Yukon with the northern border of British Columbia; the southern border of Northwest Territories with the northern borders of British Columbia, Alberta and Saskatchewan; and the southern border of mainland Nunavut with the northern border of Manitoba, leading to the expression "north of sixty" for the territories.
54°40′N	The border between 19th century Russian territories to the north and conflicting American and British land claims in western North America. The conflicting claims led to the Oregon boundary dispute between Britain and the United States, giving rise to the slogan "Fifty-four forty or fight."
52°N	In Canada, part of the border between Newfoundland and Labrador and Quebec.
51°N	The southern limit of Russian America from 1799 to 1821.
49°N	Much of the border between Canada and the United States, from British Columbia to Manitoba; "49th parallel" is a common expression for the border, though the majority of Canada's population actually lives south of the parallel.
48°N	In Canada, part of the border between Quebec and New Brunswick.
46°N	In the United States, part of the border between Washington and Oregon.
45°N	Approximates the portion of the Canada–United States border between Quebec (Canada) and New York and Vermont (US). Also approximates most of the border between Montana and Wyoming.
43°30′N	In the US, the border between Minnesota and Iowa.
43°N	In the US, much of the border between South Dakota and Nebraska.
42°30′N	In the US, the border between Wisconsin and Illinois.
42°N	Originally the northward limit of New Spain. In the US, the southern borders of Oregon and Idaho where they meet the northern borders of California, Nevada and Utah. The parallel also defines much of the border between Pennsylvania and New York.
41°N	In the US, part of the border between Wyoming and Utah, the border between Wyoming and Colorado, and part of the border between Nebraska and Colorado.
40°N	In the US, the border between Nebraska and Kansas. The parallel was originally chosen for the Mason–Dixon line, but the line was moved several miles south to avoid bisecting the city of Philadelphia.
38°N	The boundary between the Soviet and American occupation zones in Korea, and later between North Korea and South Korea, from 1945 until the Korean War (1950–1953).
37°N	In the US, the southern border of Utah with the northern border of Arizona. The southern border of Colorado with the northern borders of New Mexico and Oklahoma. The southern border of Kansas with the northern border of Oklahoma.
36°30′N	The historic Missouri Compromise line (the historic division between slave and free states). In the US, defines part of the border between Oklahoma and Texas, most of the border between Missouri and Arkansas. Geographically it is a Westward extension of the border between Virginia and North Carolina and part of the border between Kentucky and Tennessee.
36°N	In the US, a short section of the border between the Missouri Bootheel and Arkansas.
35°N	In the US, the southern border of Tennessee, which meets Mississippi, Alabama and Georgia. Also, part of the border between North Carolina and Georgia.
33°N	In the US, the southern border of Arkansas, which meets the northern border of Louisiana, is approximated by the parallel. Historically, it defined the southern border of the Louisiana Territory.
32°N	In the US, part of the border between New Mexico and Texas.
31°20′N	Part of the border between the US and Mexico (Sonora and Chihuahua); the southern border of Arizona and the New Mexico Bootheel.
31°N	Part of the border between Iran and Iraq. In the US, part of the border between Mississippi and Louisiana, and part of the border between Alabama and Florida.
28°N	In Mexico, the border between Baja California and Baja California Sur.
26°N	Part of the border between Western Sahara (claimed by Morocco) and Mauritania.
25°N	Part of the border between Mauritania and Mali.
22°N	Much of the border between Egypt and Sudan, partly disputed (see also Hala'ib Triangle).
20°N	A short section of the border between Libya and Sudan, and within Sudan, the northern border of the Darfur region.
17°N	The division between Republic of Vietnam (South Vietnam) and Democratic Republic of Vietnam (North Vietnam) during the Vietnam War.
15°N	de facto maritime border between Honduras and Nicaragua.
13°05′N	Part of the border between Chad and Cameroon, over a stretch of 41.6 km, partly in Lake Chad
10°N	Part of the border between Guinea and Sierra Leone.
8°N	Part of the border between Somalia and Ethiopia.
1°N	Part of the border between Equatorial Guinea and Gabon.
1°S	Most of the border between Uganda and Tanzania, and a very short section of the border between Kenya and Tanzania in Lake Victoria.
7°S	A short section of the border between Democratic Republic of the Congo and Angola.
8°S	Two short sections of the border between Democratic Republic of the Congo and Angola.
10°S	A short section of the border between Brazil and Peru.
13°S	Part of the border between Angola and Zambia.
16°S	Part of the border between Mozambique and Zimbabwe.
22°S	A short section of the border between Namibia and Botswana, and parts of the border between Bolivia and Argentina.
26°S	In Australia, the border between South Australia and the Northern Territory, and part of the border between South Australia and Queensland.
28°S	In Argentina, the border between Chaco Province and Santa Fe Province.
29°S	In Australia, much of the border between Queensland and New South Wales.
35°S	In Argentina, part of the border between Córdoba Province and La Pampa Province.
36°S	In Argentina, part of the border between Mendoza Province and La Pampa Province, and part of the border between San Luis Province and La Pampa Province.
42°S	In Argentina, the border between Río Negro Province and Chubut Province.
46°S	In Argentina, the border between Chubut Province and Santa Cruz Province.
52°S	Part of the border between Argentina and Chile.
60°S	The northern boundary of Antarctica for the purposes of the Antarctic Treaty System (see map). The northern boundary of the Southern Ocean.

== Elevation ==
The features of the ellipsoid cross-section (orange) in this image are exaggerated with respect to those of the Earth.

Normally the circles of latitude are defined at zero elevation. Elevation has an effect on a location with respect to the plane formed by a circle of latitude. Since (in the geodetic system) altitude and depth are determined by the normal to the Earth's surface, locations sharing the same latitude—but having different elevations (i.e., lying along this normal)—no longer lie within this plane. Rather, all points sharing the same latitude—but of varying elevation and longitude—occupy the surface of a truncated cone formed by the rotation of this normal around the Earth's axis of rotation.

== See also ==
- Circles of a sphere
- List of circles of latitude
