= Circles of latitude between the 60th parallel north and the 65th parallel north =

Circles of latitude

Following are circles of latitude between the 60th parallel north and the 65th parallel north:

== 61st parallel north ==
61st parallel north (interactive map)

The 61st parallel north is a circle of latitude that is 61 degrees north of the Earth's equatorial plane. It crosses the Atlantic Ocean, Europe, Asia and North America.

At this latitude the sun is visible for 19 hours, 16 minutes during the summer solstice and 5 hours, 32 minutes during the winter solstice.

This latitude also roughly corresponds to the minimum latitude in which civil twilight can last all night near the summer solstice.

=== Around the world ===
Starting at the Prime Meridian and heading eastwards, the parallel 61° north passes through:

Coordinates	Country, territory or ocean	Notes
61°0′N 0°0′E	Atlantic Ocean	Defines the border between North Sea and Norwegian Sea
61°0′N 4°32′E	Norway	Islands and skerries of, and Indrevær proper, Solund Municipality, Vestland county
61°0′N 4°37′E	Atlantic Ocean	Straumsfjorden, North Sea
61°0′N 4°39′E	Norway	Islands and skerries of, and Ytre Sula proper, Solund Municipality, Vestland county
61°0′N 4°44′E	Atlantic Ocean	Sognesjøen, North Sea
61°0′N 4°56′E	Norway	Hiserøyna, Gulen Municipality, and the mainland of Vestland county
61°0′N 5°28′E	Atlantic Ocean	Risnefjorden, Sognefjorden, North Sea
61°0′N 5°29′E	Norway	Vestland county
61°0′N 7°2′E	Atlantic Ocean	Aurlandsfjorden, Sognefjorden, North Sea
61°0′N 7°4′E	Norway	Vestland, Buskerud, and Innlandet counties
61°0′N 12°14′E	Sweden	
61°0′N 17°13′E	Atlantic Ocean	Gulf of Bothnia, Baltic Sea
61°0′N 21°17′E	Finland	Passing through Hämeenlinna, Finland
61°0′N 28°41′E	Russia	Passing through Lake Ladoga, Lake Onega and by the approximate hypocentre of the 1908 Tunguska event
61°0′N 156°5′E	Pacific Ocean	Gizhigin Bay, Sea of Okhotsk
61°0′N 159°53′E	Russia	
61°0′N 161°10′E	Pacific Ocean	Penzhin Bay, Sea of Okhotsk
61°0′N 163°30′E	Russia	Kamchatka Peninsula
61°0′N 172°11′E	Pacific Ocean	Bering Sea
61°0′N 165°10′W	United States	Alaska
61°0′N 151°30′W	Pacific Ocean	Cook Inlet, Gulf of Alaska
61°0′N 150°31′W	United States	Alaska - Kenai Peninsula
61°0′N 150°19′W	Pacific Ocean	Turnagain Arm, Cook Inlet, Gulf of Alaska
61°0′N 149°39′W	United States	Alaska passing through the southern part of Anchorage
61°0′N 141°0′W	Canada	Yukon; Northwest Territories - passing through the Great Slave Lake; Nunavut
61°0′N 94°10′W	Arctic Ocean	Hudson Bay
61°0′N 77°59′W	Canada	Quebec - Ungava Peninsula; Nunavut - Diana Island
61°0′N 69°55′W	Arctic Ocean	Diana Bay, Hudson Strait
61°0′N 69°40′W	Canada	Quebec - Ungava Peninsula
61°0′N 69°28′W	Arctic Ocean	Hudson Strait
61°0′N 64°43′W	Arctic Ocean	Davis Strait
61°0′N 0°24′W	Greenland	
61°0′N 0°41′W	United Kingdom	Passing just north of Out Stack, Muckle Flugga and Unst, Shetland Islands, Scotland, United Kingdom

== 62nd parallel north ==
62nd parallel north (interactive map)

The 62nd parallel north is a circle of latitude that is 62 degrees north of the Earth's equatorial plane. It crosses the Atlantic Ocean, Europe, Asia and North America.

At this latitude the sun is visible for 19 hours, 45 minutes during the summer solstice and 5 hours, 9 minutes during the winter solstice.

=== Around the world ===
Starting at the Prime Meridian and heading eastwards, the parallel 62° north passes through:

Coordinates	Country, territory or sea	Notes
62°0′N 0°0′E	Atlantic Ocean	Norwegian Sea
62°0′N 5°0′E	Norway	Island of Vågsøy, Kinn Municipality, Vestland county
62°0′N 5°9′E	Atlantic Ocean	Sildegapet, Norwegian Sea
62°0′N 5°16′E	Norway	Island of Barmøya, Stad Municipality, Vestland county
62°0′N 5°18′E	Atlantic Ocean	Barmsundet, Norwegian Sea
62°0′N 5°20′E	Norway	Mainland Vestland, Møre og Romsdal, and Innlandet counties
62°0′N 12°13′E	Sweden	
62°0′N 17°27′E	Atlantic Ocean	Gulf of Bothnia, Baltic Sea
62°0′N 21°17′E	Finland	
62°0′N 30°23′E	Russia	Passing through Lake Onega; Passing through Yakutsk
62°0′N 163°8′E	Pacific Ocean	Penzhin Bay, Sea of Okhotsk
62°0′N 164°6′E	Russia	
62°0′N 175°11′E	Pacific Ocean	Bering Sea
62°0′N 165°46′W	United States	Alaska
62°0′N 141°0′W	Canada	Yukon; Northwest Territories - passing through the Great Slave Lake; Nunavut
62°0′N 93°8′W	Arctic Ocean	Hudson Bay; Passing just south of Coats Island, Nunavut, Canada
62°0′N 80°16′W	Canada	Nunavut - Mansel Island
62°0′N 79°24′W	Arctic Ocean	Hudson Bay
62°0′N 78°10′W	Canada	Quebec - Ungava Peninsula
62°0′N 72°34′W	Arctic Ocean	Hudson Strait
62°0′N 72°17′W	Canada	Nunavut - Smooth Island
62°0′N 72°15′W	Arctic Ocean	Hudson Strait
62°0′N 66°44′W	Canada	Nunavut - Baffin Island
62°0′N 66°6′W	Arctic Ocean	Davis Strait; Passing just north of Edgell Island, Nunavut, Canada
62°0′N 49°43′W	Greenland	
62°0′N 42°7′W	Atlantic Ocean	
62°0′N 7°0′W	Faroe Islands	Islands of Koltur, Streymoy and Nólsoy
62°0′N 6°38′W	Atlantic Ocean	Norwegian Sea

== 63rd parallel north ==
63rd parallel north (interactive map)

The 63rd parallel north is a circle of latitude that is 63 degrees north of the Earth's equatorial plane. It crosses the Atlantic Ocean, Europe, Asia and North America.

At this latitude the sun is visible for 20 hours, 19 minutes during the summer solstice and 4 hours, 43 minutes during the winter solstice. If the latitude in the northern hemisphere is 63º26' or smaller, it is possible to view both astronomical dawn and dusk every day of the month of September.

=== Around the world ===
Starting at the Prime Meridian and heading eastwards, the parallel 63° north passes through:

Coordinates	Country, territory or ocean	Notes
63°0′N 0°0′E	Atlantic Ocean	Norwegian Sea
63°0′N 7°11′E	Norway	Hustadvika Municipality, Møre og Romsdal county
63°0′N 7°18′E	Atlantic Ocean	Lauvøyfjorden, Norwegian Sea
63°0′N 7°23′E	Norway	Averøya, Averøy Municipality, Møre og Romsdal county
63°0′N 7°43′E	Atlantic Ocean	Kvernesfjorden, Norwegian Sea
63°0′N 7°53′E	Norway	Aspøya, Tingvoll Municipality, Møre og Romsdal county
63°0′N 7°57′E	Atlantic Ocean	Tingvollfjorden, Norwegian Sea
63°0′N 8°3′E	Norway	Tingvoll Municipality, Møre og Romsdal county
63°0′N 8°15′E	Atlantic Ocean	Trongfjorden, Norwegian Sea
63°0′N 8°20′E	Norway	Surnadal Municipality, Møre og Romsdal county
63°0′N 8°30′E	Atlantic Ocean	Hamnesfjorden, Norwegian Sea
63°0′N 8°32′E	Norway	Møre og Romsdal and Trøndelag counties
63°0′N 12°12′E	Sweden	Mainland and Ulvön Island
63°0′N 18°39′E	Atlantic Ocean	Gulf of Bothnia, Baltic Sea
63°0′N 21°7′E	Finland	
63°0′N 31°30′E	Russia	
63°0′N 179°15′E	Pacific Ocean	Bering Sea
63°0′N 169°46′W	United States	Alaska - St. Lawrence Island
63°0′N 169°33′W	Pacific Ocean	Bering Sea
63°0′N 164°43′W	United States	Alaska
63°0′N 141°0′W	Canada	Yukon; Northwest Territories; Nunavut
63°0′N 90°42′W	Arctic Ocean	Hudson Bay; Passing just south of Southampton Island, Nunavut, Canada
63°0′N 84°55′W	Arctic Ocean	Fisher Strait, Hudson Bay
63°0′N 82°43′W	Canada	Nunavut - Bencas Island
63°0′N 82°41′W	Arctic Ocean	Evans Strait, Hudson Bay; Passing just north of Coats Island, Nunavut, Canada
63°0′N 81°50′W	Arctic Ocean	Hudson Bay
63°0′N 78°30′W	Arctic Ocean	Hudson Strait; Passing just south of Nottingham Island, Nunavut, Canada
63°0′N 71°12′W	Canada	Nunavut - Meta Incognita Peninsula, Baffin Island
63°0′N 67°28′W	Arctic Ocean	Frobisher Bay, Davis Strait
63°0′N 66°54′W	Canada	Nunavut - Chase Island and Hall Peninsula, Baffin Island
63°0′N 64°45′W	Arctic Ocean	Davis Strait
63°0′N 50°30′W	Greenland	
63°0′N 41°28′W	Atlantic Ocean	Passing 32 km south of Surtsey, Iceland

== 64th parallel north ==
64th parallel north (interactive map)

The 64th parallel north is a circle of latitude that is 64 degrees north of the Earth's equatorial plane. It crosses the Atlantic Ocean, Europe, Asia and North America.

At this latitude the sun is visible for 21 hours, 1 minute during the summer solstice and 4 hours, 12 minutes during the winter solstice.

=== Around the world ===
Starting at the Prime Meridian and heading eastwards, the parallel 64° north passes through:

Coordinates	Country, territory or ocean	Notes
64°0′N 0°0′E	Atlantic Ocean	Norwegian Sea
64°0′N 9°5′E	Norway	Islands and skerries of Froan, Frøya Municipality, Trøndelag county
64°0′N 9°11′E	Atlantic Ocean	Frohavet, Norwegian Sea
64°0′N 9°49′E	Norway	Islands and skerries of, and Linesøya, Åfjord Municipality, Trøndelag county
64°0′N 9°55′E	Atlantic Ocean	Linesfjorden and Paulen, Norwegian Sea
64°0′N 10°1′E	Norway	Mainland Trøndelag county
64°0′N 11°11′E	Atlantic Ocean	Beitstadfjorden, Trondheimsfjorden, Norwegian Sea
64°0′N 11°28′E	Norway	Trøndelag county
64°0′N 12°45′E	Sweden	Passing just north of Umeå
64°0′N 20°55′E	Atlantic Ocean	Gulf of Bothnia, Baltic Sea
64°0′N 23°23′E	Finland	
64°0′N 30°28′E	Russia	
64°0′N 36°15′E	Arctic Ocean	Onega Bay, White Sea, Barents Sea
64°0′N 38°4′E	Russia	
64°0′N 178°40′E	Arctic Ocean	Bering Sea
64°0′N 160°54′W	United States	Alaska - passing through a runway of Allen Army Airfield
64°0′N 141°0′W	Canada	Yukon - passing 6 km south of Dawson City; Northwest Territories; Nunavut
64°0′N 88°41′W	Arctic Ocean	Roes Welcome Sound, Hudson Bay
64°0′N 86°34′W	Canada	Nunavut - Southampton Island
64°0′N 83°40′W	Arctic Ocean	South Bay, Hudson Bay
64°0′N 83°9′W	Canada	Nunavut - Southampton Island
64°0′N 80°36′W	Arctic Ocean	Foxe Channel
64°0′N 78°2′W	Canada	Nunavut - Mill Island and neighbouring islands
64°0′N 77°30′W	Arctic Ocean	Hudson Strait
64°0′N 72°44′W	Canada	Nunavut - Baffin Island
64°0′N 64°40′W	Arctic Ocean	Davis Strait
64°0′N 51°43′W	Greenland	Sermersooq; Passing just south of Nuuk
64°0′N 40°38′W	Atlantic Ocean	
64°0′N 22°43′W	Iceland	Passing just south of Reykjavík
64°0′N 16°17′W	Atlantic Ocean	

== 65th parallel north ==
65th parallel north (interactive map)

The 65th parallel north is a circle of latitude that is 65 degrees north of the Earth's equatorial plane. It crosses the Atlantic Ocean, Europe, Asia and North America.

At this latitude the sun is visible for 22 hours, 4 minutes during the June solstice and 3 hours, 35 minutes during the December solstice.

=== Around the world ===
Starting at the Prime Meridian and heading eastwards, the parallel 65° north passes through:

Coordinates	Country, territory or ocean	Notes
65°0′N 0°0′E	Atlantic Ocean	Norwegian Sea
65°0′N 10°49′E	Norway	Islands and skerries of Nærøysund Municipality, Trøndelag county
65°0′N 11°9′E	Atlantic Ocean	Risværfjorden, Norwegian Sea
65°0′N 11°37′E	Norway	Mainland Trøndelag county
65°0′N 11°47′E	Atlantic Ocean	Årsetfjorden, Lekafjorden, Norwegian Sea
65°0′N 11°48′E	Norway	Trøndelag and Nordland counties
65°0′N 20°03′E	Sweden	Jörn, Västerbotten County
65°0′N 21°23′E	Atlantic Ocean	Gulf of Bothnia, Baltic Sea
65°0′N 24°34′E	Finland	Island of Hailuoto and mainland, passing south of Oulu.
65°0′N 29°36′E	Russia	
65°0′N 34°48′E	Arctic Ocean	Onega Bay, White Sea, Barents Sea
65°0′N 35°42′E	Russia	Solovetsky Islands
65°0′N 35°51′E	Arctic Ocean	Onega Bay, White Sea, Barents Sea
65°0′N 36°48′E	Russia	Onega Peninsula
65°0′N 37°43′E	Arctic Ocean	Dvina Bay, White Sea, Barents Sea
65°0′N 40°19′E	Russia	
65°0′N 179°53′E	Pacific Ocean	Gulf of Anadyr, Bering Sea
65°0′N 175°52′W	Russia	Chukchi Peninsula
65°0′N 172°13′W	Pacific Ocean	Bering Strait, Bering Sea; Passing just north of King Island, Alaska, United States
65°0′N 166°41′W	United States	Alaska
65°0′N 141°0′W	Canada	Yukon; Northwest Territories – passing through Great Bear Lake; Nunavut
65°0′N 87°7′W	Arctic Ocean	Roes Welcome Sound, Hudson Bay
65°0′N 86°12′W	Canada	Nunavut – Southampton Island
65°0′N 83°17′W	Arctic Ocean	Foxe Basin
65°0′N 78°3′W	Canada	Nunavut – Baffin Island
65°0′N 66°30′W	Arctic Ocean	Cumberland Sound, Labrador Sea
65°0′N 63°49′W	Canada	Nunavut – Cumberland Peninsula, Baffin Island
65°0′N 63°27′W	Arctic Ocean	Davis Strait
65°0′N 51°48′W	Greenland	Fiskevandet
65°0′N 40°36′W	Atlantic Ocean	Pikiulleq, Denmark Strait
65°0′N 39°46′W	Greenland	Takiseeq
65°0′N 39°47′W	Atlantic Ocean	Denmark Strait
65°0′N 23°14′W	Iceland	
65°0′N 13°36′W	Atlantic Ocean	Norwegian Sea

=== Notable cities and towns on 65°N ===
- Fairbanks, Alaska, United States
- Oulu, North Ostrobothnia, Finland

== See also ==
- 60th parallel north
- Circles of latitude between the 55th parallel north and the 60th parallel north
- Circles of latitude between the 65th parallel north and the 70th parallel north
