= Circles of latitude between the 35th parallel south and the 40th parallel south =

Circles of latitude

Following are circles of latitude between the 35th parallel south and the 40th parallel south:

== 36th parallel south ==
36th parallel south (interactive map)

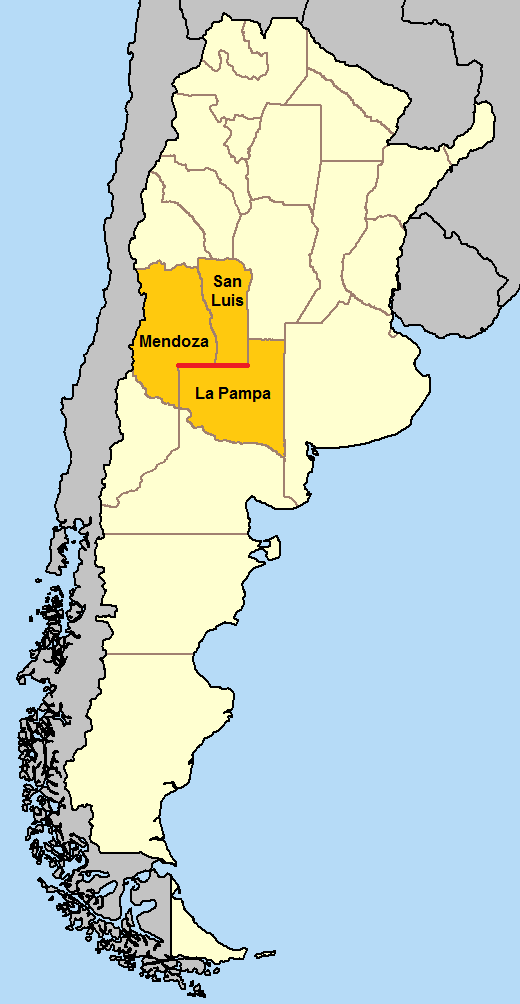
In Argentina, the 36th parallel south defines part of the border between Mendoza Province and La Pampa Province, and part of the border between San Luis Province and La Pampa Province.

The 36th parallel south is a circle of latitude that is 36 degrees south of the Earth's equatorial plane. It crosses the Atlantic Ocean, the Indian Ocean, Australasia, the Pacific Ocean and South America.

=== Around the world ===
Starting at the Prime Meridian and heading eastwards, the parallel 36° south passes through:

Coordinates	Country, territory or ocean	Notes
36°0′S 0°0′E	Atlantic Ocean	
36°0′S 20°0′E	Indian Ocean	
36°0′S 136°41′E	Australia	South Australia - Kangaroo Island, including the Cape Bouguer Wilderness Protection Area and that of Cape Gantheaume
36°0′S 137°36′E	Indian Ocean	D'Estrees Bay, Backstairs Passage and Encounter Bay
36°0′S 139°28′E	Australia	South Australia, including the Coorong; Victoria; New South Wales
36°0′S 150°9′E	Pacific Ocean	Tasman Sea
36°0′S 173°47′E	New Zealand	Northland Region – passing south of Waipu (at 35°59′5″S 174°26′50″E)
36°0′S 174°29′E	Pacific Ocean	Passing just south of the Hen and Chicken Islands, New Zealand; Passing just north of Great Barrier Island, New Zealand
36°0′S 72°47′W	Chile	Maule Region
36°0′S 70°24′W	Argentina	The parallel defines part of the border between Mendoza Province and La Pampa Province, and part of the border between San Luis Province and La Pampa Province
36°0′S 57°21′W	Atlantic Ocean	

== 37th parallel south ==
37th parallel south (interactive map)

The 37th parallel south is a circle of latitude that is 37 degrees south of the Earth's equatorial plane. It crosses the Atlantic Ocean, the Indian Ocean, Australasia, the Pacific Ocean and South America.

This parallel approximates that latitude at which solar irradiance equals the planetary average, with higher insolation equatorward and lower poleward.

An exploration of the 37th parallel south is the theme of Jules Verne's novel In Search of the Castaways. The phantom reef of Maria Theresa Reef is supposed to lie on this parallel in the Pacific Ocean.

=== Around the world ===
Starting at the Prime Meridian and heading eastwards, the parallel 37° south passes through:

Coordinates	Country, territory or ocean	Notes
37°0′S 0°0′E	Atlantic Ocean	
37°0′S 20°0′E	Indian Ocean	Passing just north of Île Amsterdam.
37°0′S 139°42′E	Australia	South Australia – passing south of Naracoorte (at 36°57′18″S 140°44′34″E); Victoria – passing directly through Puckapunyal (at 37°0′0″S 145°2′0″E); New South Wales – passing north of Eden (at 37°4′0″S 149°54′0″E)
37°0′S 149°56′E	Pacific Ocean	Tasman Sea
37°0′S 174°28′E	New Zealand	North Island – passing through Auckland just north of Auckland Airport (at 37°0′29″S 174°47′30″E)
37°0′S 175°16′E	Pacific Ocean	Hauraki Gulf
37°0′S 175°30′E	New Zealand	Coromandel Peninsula, North Island – passing through Tairua
37°0′S 175°51′E	Pacific Ocean	
37°0′S 73°33′W	Chile	Santa María Island
37°0′S 73°31′W	Pacific Ocean	
37°0′S 73°11′W	Chile	Bío Bío Region – passing through Coronel (at 37°0′S 73°10′W)
37°0′S 71°9′W	Argentina	Neuquén Province; Mendoza Province; La Pampa Province; Buenos Aires Province – passing through Pinamar (at 37°0′0″S 56°47′30″W)
37°0′S 56°45′W	Atlantic Ocean	Passing just north of the island of Tristan da Cunha, Saint Helena, Ascension and Tristan da Cunha

== 38th parallel south ==
38th parallel south (interactive map)

The 38th parallel south is a circle of latitude that is 38 degrees south of the Earth's equatorial plane. It crosses the Atlantic Ocean, the Indian Ocean, Australia, New Zealand, the Pacific Ocean, and South America, including the Andes Mountains and Patagonia.

At this latitude the sun is visible for 14 hours, 48 minutes during the December solstice and 9 hours, 32 minutes during the June solstice.

=== Around the world ===
Starting at the Prime Meridian and heading eastwards, the parallel 38° south passes through:

Coordinates	Country, territory or ocean	Notes
38°0′S 0°0′E	Atlantic Ocean	
38°0′S 20°0′E	Indian Ocean	Passing just south of Île Amsterdam, French Southern and Antarctic Lands
38°0′S 140°32′E	Australia	South Australia – passing through the locality of Allendale East (at 38°0′12″S 140°42′31″E), between Mount Gambier and Port MacDonnell; Victoria – passing through Port Phillip Bay and southeastern Melbourne
38°0′S 147°42′E	Pacific Ocean	Tasman Sea
38°0′S 174°47′E	New Zealand	North Island - passing through Te Awamutu and Ōpōtiki
38°0′S 178°21′E	Pacific Ocean	
38°0′S 73°28′W	Chile	Bío Bío Region; Araucanía Region; Bío Bío Region
38°0′S 71°5′W	Argentina	Neuquén Province; Río Negro Province; La Pampa Province; Buenos Aires Province – passing through Mar del Plata (at 38°0′S 57°35′W)
38°0′S 57°33′W	Atlantic Ocean	

== 39th parallel south ==
39th parallel south (interactive map)

The 39th parallel south is a circle of latitude that is 39 degrees south of the Earth's equatorial plane. It crosses the Atlantic Ocean, the Indian Ocean, Australasia, the Pacific Ocean and South America.

Daylight along the 39th parallel south falls under 10 hours a day starting on 17 May and returns to over ten hours a day beginning 29 July. The growth of crops and other plants is considerably slowed during this period of reduced sunlight.

=== Around the world ===
Starting at the Prime Meridian and heading eastwards, the parallel 39° south passes through:

Coordinates	Country, territory or ocean	Notes
39°0′S 0°0′E	Atlantic Ocean	
39°0′S 20°0′E	Indian Ocean	Passing just south of Île Saint-Paul, French Southern and Antarctic Lands
39°0′S 143°30′E	Indian Ocean	Bass Strait
39°0′S 146°15′E	Australia	Victoria - Wilsons Promontory
39°0′S 146°27′E	Pacific Ocean	Tasman Sea
39°0′S 174°10′E	New Zealand	Taranaki region – passing through Waitara; Manawatu-Whanganui region Waikato region – passing just south of Turangi; Bay of Plenty region – for about 2 km (1.2 mi); Hawke's Bay region
39°0′S 177°53′E	Pacific Ocean	
39°0′S 73°19′W	Chile	Araucanía Region – passing through Teodoro Schmidt and Sollipulli Volcano
39°0′S 71°28′W	Argentina	Neuquén Province; Río Negro Province – passing through General Roca (at 39°0′S 67°35′W); La Pampa Province; Buenos Aires Province – passing through Bahía Blanca (at 39°0′S 62°09′W)
39°0′S 62°0′W	Atlantic Ocean	

== 40th parallel south ==
40th parallel south (interactive map)

The 40th parallel south is a circle of latitude that is 40 degrees south of the Earth's equatorial plane. It crosses the Atlantic Ocean, the Indian Ocean, Oceania, the Pacific Ocean and South America. Its long oceanic stretches are the northern domain of the Roaring Forties.

On 21 June 2018, the sun is at 26.17° in the sky and at 73.83° on 21 December, in King Island, Tasmania, which is near the 40th parallel.

The maximum altitude of the Sun is > 35.00º in April and > 28.00º in May.

The 40th parallel south also marks a line beyond which the constellation of Andromeda can no longer be observed.

=== Around the world ===
Starting at the Prime Meridian and heading eastwards, the parallel 40° south passes through:

Coordinates	Country, territory or ocean	Notes
40°0′S 0°0′E	Atlantic Ocean	
40°0′S 20°0′E	Indian Ocean	
40°0′S 143°53′E	Australia	King Island, Tasmania
40°0′S 144°7′E	Indian Ocean	Bass Strait
40°0′S 147°53′E	Australia	Flinders Island, Tasmania
40°0′S 148°17′E	Pacific Ocean	Tasman Sea
40°0′S 175°3′E	New Zealand	Manawatu-Whanganui region – passing just south of Whanganui; Hawke's Bay region – passing through Waipukurau
40°0′S 176°54′E	Pacific Ocean	
40°0′S 73°42′W	Chile	Los Ríos Region – passing through Punta Galera and Pirihueico Lake
40°0′S 71°40′W	Argentina	Neuquén Province; Río Negro Province; Buenos Aires Province
40°0′S 62°20′W	Atlantic Ocean	

== See also ==
- Circles of latitude between the 30th parallel south and the 35th parallel south
- Circles of latitude between the 40th parallel south and the 45th parallel south
- Roaring Forties
- Project Loon
