= Circles of latitude between the 30th parallel north and the 35th parallel north =

Circles of latitude

Following are circles of latitude between the 30th parallel north and the 35th parallel north:

== 31st parallel north ==
31st parallel north (interactive map)

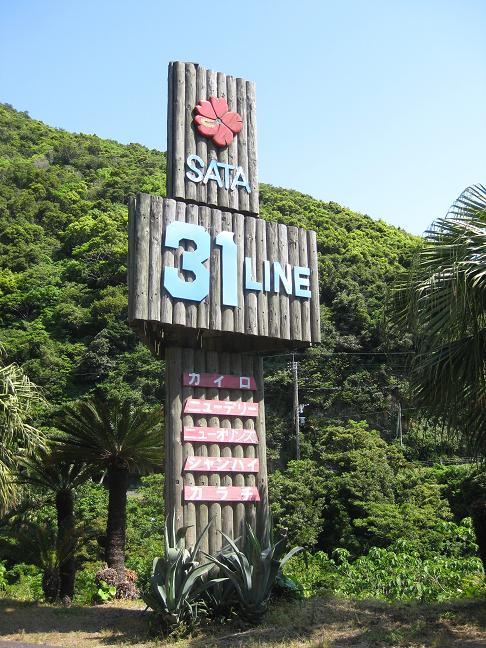
Sign marking the 31st parallel north at Cape Sata, Japan

In the United States, the 31st parallel defines part of the border between Mississippi and Louisiana, and part of the border between Alabama and Florida.

The 31st parallel north is a circle of latitude that is 31 degrees north of the Earth's equatorial plane. It crosses Africa, Asia, the Pacific Ocean, North America, and the Atlantic Ocean. At this latitude the sun is visible for 14 hours, 10 minutes during the summer solstice and 10 hours, 8 minutes during the winter solstice.

Part of the border between Iran and Iraq is defined by the parallel.

In the United States, it defines part of the border between the states of Mississippi and Louisiana, and most of the border between Alabama and Florida. Andrew Ellicott surveyed this parallel in 1797, which in Pinckney's Treaty two years before had been defined as the border between the United States and the Spanish territory of West Florida.

=== Around the world ===
Starting at the Prime Meridian and heading eastwards, the parallel 31° north passes through:

Coordinates	Country, territory or sea	Notes
31°0′N 0°0′E	Algeria	
31°0′N 9°22′E	Tunisia	
31°0′N 10°17′E	Libya	
31°0′N 17°33′E	Mediterranean Sea	Gulf of Sidra
31°0′N 20°8′E	Libya	
31°0′N 24°56′E	Egypt	
31°0′N 28°43′E	Mediterranean Sea	
31°0′N 29°35′E	Egypt	
31°0′N 34°21′E	Israel	Passing just north of Yeruham
31°0′N 35°24′E	Jordan	
31°0′N 37°30′E	Saudi Arabia	Passing through Arar
31°0′N 42°14′E	Iraq	Passing through Nasiriyah
31°0′N 47°42′E	Iran / Iraq border	
31°0′N 48°1′E	Iran	
31°0′N 61°50′E	Afghanistan	
31°0′N 66°35′E	Pakistan	Balochistan; Punjab
31°0′N 74°33′E	India	Punjab; Himachal Pradesh; Uttarakhand
31°0′N 79°32′E	China	Tibet; Sichuan; Chongqing; Hubei; Anhui; Zhejiang; Jiangsu; Zhejiang - for about 5 km (3.1 mi); Jiangsu - for about 5 km (3.1 mi); Zhejiang - for about 11 km (6.8 mi); Shanghai
31°0′N 121°53′E	East China Sea	
31°0′N 130°39′E	Japan	Cape Sata, the southernmost point of the island of Kyūshū
31°0′N 130°41′E	Pacific Ocean	
31°0′N 116°20′W	Mexico	Baja California
31°0′N 114°50′W	Gulf of California	
31°0′N 113°6′W	Mexico	Sonora; Chihuahua
31°0′N 105°33′W	United States	Texas; Louisiana; Mississippi / Louisiana border Mississippi; Alabama; Alabama / Florida border Georgia
31°0′N 81°28′W	Atlantic Ocean	
31°0′N 9°49′W	Morocco	
31°0′N 3°33′W	Algeria	

== 32nd parallel north ==
32nd parallel north (interactive map)

In the United States, the parallel defines part of the border between New Mexico and Texas.

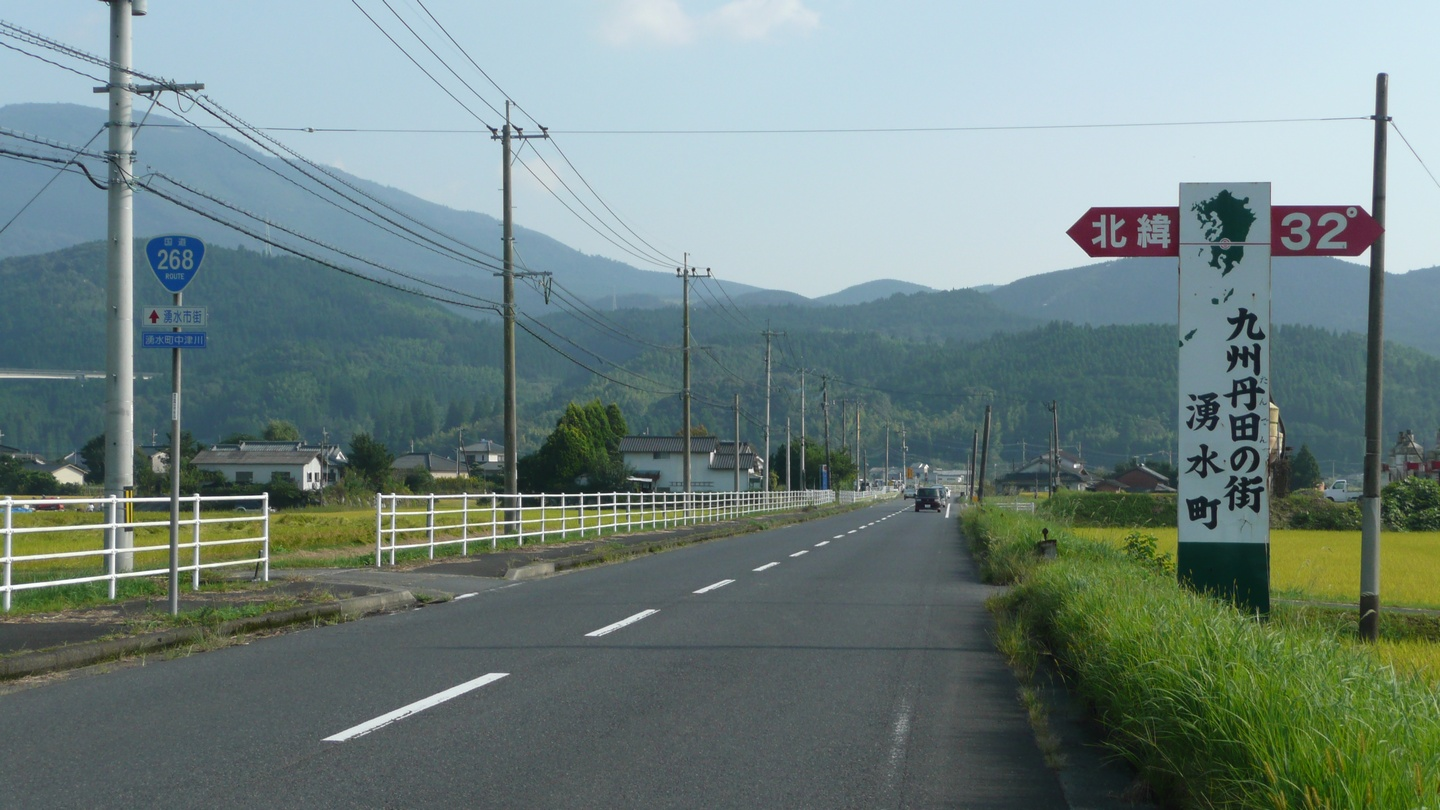
Sign marking the 32nd parallel north at Yusui, Kagoshima Prefecture, Japan.

The 32nd parallel north is a circle of latitude that is 32 degrees north of the Earth's equatorial plane. It crosses Africa, Asia, the Pacific Ocean, North America, and the Atlantic Ocean.

In the United States, the parallel defines part of the border between New Mexico and Texas. It was the proposed route of the Texas Pacific Railroad.

From 27 August 1992 to 4 September 1996, the parallel defined the limit of the southern no-fly zone in Iraq as part of Operation Southern Watch. This limit was then moved to the 33rd parallel north.

At this latitude the sun is visible for 14 hours, 15 minutes during the summer solstice and 10 hours, 3 minutes during the winter solstice.

=== Around the world ===
Starting at the Prime Meridian and heading eastwards, the parallel 32° north passes through:

Coordinates	Country, territory or sea	Notes
32°0′N 0°0′E	Algeria	Passing just north of Ouargla
32°0′N 9°8′E	Tunisia	
32°0′N 10°47′E	Libya	
32°0′N 15°21′E	Mediterranean Sea	Gulf of Sirte
32°0′N 19°58′E	Libya	
32°0′N 24°49′E	Mediterranean Sea	
32°0′N 34°44′E	Israel	Passing through: Holon; Beit Dagan; Ben Gurion Airport in Tel Aviv; Shoham
32°0′N 35°0′E	West Bank	Controlled by Israel and Palestine
32°0′N 35°32′E	Jordan	Passing through Khilda, northwestern Amman
32°0′N 39°0′E	Saudi Arabia	
32°0′N 40°6′E	Iraq	Passing through Al Diwaniyah
32°0′N 47°42′E	Iran	
32°0′N 60°50′E	Afghanistan	
32°0′N 69°18′E	Pakistan	Balochistan - for about 16 km Khyber Pakhtunkhwa; Punjab
32°0′N 74°50′E	India	Punjab; Himachal Pradesh
32°0′N 78°44′E	China	Tibet; Qinghai; Tibet (for about 12 km); Qinghai (for about 6 km); Tibet (for about 4 km); Qinghai (for about 4 km); Tibet; Sichuan; Chongqing; Shaanxi; Hubei; Henan; Anhui; Jiangsu — passing just south of Nanjing
32°0′N 121°45′E	East China Sea	
32°0′N 130°11′E	Japan	Island of Kyūshū: — Kagoshima Prefecture — Miyazaki Prefecture
32°0′N 131°30′E	Pacific Ocean	
32°0′N 116°51′W	Mexico	Baja California - passing 10 km north of Ensenada; Sonora
32°0′N 113°12′W	United States	California - Passing through San Diego County Arizona; New Mexico; New Mexico / Texas border Texas — passing through the cities of Midland and Hillsboro; Louisiana; Mississippi; Alabama; Georgia — passing through the city of Savannah
32°0′N 80°50′W	Atlantic Ocean	Passing just south of Bermuda; Passing just south of the Desertas Islands, Madeira, Portugal
32°0′N 9°22′W	Morocco	
32°0′N 2°56′W	Algeria	

== 33rd parallel north ==
33rd parallel north (interactive map)

In the United States, the 33rd parallel approximately defines the border between Arkansas and Louisiana.

The 33rd parallel north is a circle of latitude that is 33 degrees north of the Earth's equatorial plane. It is approximate at the midpoint between the equator (0 degrees) and the Arctic Circle (66.6 degrees North Latitude.) It crosses North Africa, Asia, the Pacific Ocean, North America and the Atlantic Ocean.

In Iraq, the parallel defined the limit of the southern no-fly zone from 4 September 1996 to 30 August 2003. (Before this time, it had been set at the 32nd parallel north) as part of Operation Southern Watch.

In the United States, it approximately forms the border between Arkansas in the north and Louisiana on the south. (The border is actually a couple of kilometres north of the parallel.) The Louisiana Territory was that part of the 1803 Louisiana Purchase which lay north of the 33rd parallel.

The parallel is part of the horse latitudes.

At this latitude the sun is visible for 14 hours, 20 minutes during the summer solstice and 9 hours, 58 minutes during the winter solstice.

=== Around the world ===
Starting at the prime meridian and heading eastwards, the parallel 33° north passes through:

Coordinates	Country, territory or sea	Notes
33°0′N 0°0′E	Algeria	
33°0′N 8°11′E	Tunisia	
33°0′N 11°31′E	Libya	
33°0′N 12°0′E	Mediterranean Sea	Passing just north of Tripoli, Libya
33°0′N 35°5′E	Israel	Passing through Nahariya and Amuka
33°0′N 35°38′E	Golan Heights	Territory controlled by Israel, claimed by Syria – passing through the northern edge of Katzrin
33°0′N 35°52′E	UNDOF buffer zone	About 500 m (1,640 ft)
33°0′N 35°53′E	Syria	
33°0′N 38°5′E	Jordan	
33°0′N 39°3′E	Iraq	Passing just south of Baghdad
33°0′N 46°6′E	Iran	
33°0′N 60°38′E	Afghanistan	
33°0′N 69°30′E	Pakistan	Khyber Pakhtunkhwa Punjab; Azad Kashmir – claimed by India
33°0′N 74°21′E	India	Jammu and Kashmir – claimed by Pakistan; Ladakh – claimed by Pakistan; Himachal Pradesh
33°0′N 79°14′E	Aksai Chin	Disputed between India and China
33°0′N 79°21′E	China	Tibet; Qinghai; Sichuan; Qinghai; Sichuan; Gansu; Shaanxi; Hubei; Henan; Anhui; Jiangsu; Anhui (for about 12 km (7.5 mi)); Jiangsu
33°0′N 126°16′E	South Korea Sea	Passing just south of the island of Marado, South Korea
33°0′N 129°2′E	Japan	Island of Nakadōri: — Nagasaki Prefecture; Island of Kyūshū: — Nagasaki Prefecture — Saga Prefecture — Kumamoto Prefecture — Ōita Prefecture; Island of Shikoku: — Ehime Prefecture — Kōchi Prefecture
33°0′N 133°1′E	Pacific Ocean	
33°0′N 118°35′W	United States	California – Northern tip of San Clemente Island
33°0′N 118°33′W	Pacific Ocean	
33°0′N 117°17′W	United States	California – passing through Solana Beach and just north of Brawley; Arizona – passing through Casa Grande Ruins National Monument; New Mexico; Texas – passing through the Dallas–Fort Worth metroplex Louisiana – passing just south of the border with Arkansas; Mississippi; Alabama; Georgia – passing through LaGrange, and Louisville; South Carolina – passing through Goose Creek
33°0′N 79°28′W	Atlantic Ocean	
33°0′N 16°23′W	Portugal	Cal Islet, just south of Porto Santo Island, Madeira
33°0′N 16°22′W	Atlantic Ocean	
33°0′N 8°45′W	Morocco	Passing through Settat
33°0′N 1°28′W	Algeria	

== 34th parallel north ==
34th parallel north (interactive map)

The 34th parallel north is a circle of latitude that is 34 degrees north of the Earth's equatorial plane. It crosses Africa, the Mediterranean Sea, Asia, the Pacific Ocean, North America and the Atlantic Ocean.

The parallel formed the southern boundary of the original Colony of Virginia as outlined in the London Company charter.

In the Confederate States, the parallel formed the northern boundary of Arizona Territory.

At this latitude the sun is visible for 14 hours, 25 minutes during the summer solstice and 9 hours, 53 minutes during the winter solstice.

=== Around the world ===
Starting at the Prime Meridian and heading eastwards, the parallel 34° north passes through:

Coordinates	Country, territory or sea	Notes
34°0′N 0°0′E	Algeria	
34°0′N 7°33′E	Tunisia	
34°0′N 10°3′E	Mediterranean Sea	Passing just north of Beirut, Lebanon
34°0′N 35°39′E	Lebanon	
34°0′N 36°22′E	Syria	
34°0′N 40°6′E	Iraq	
34°0′N 45°27′E	Iran	Kermanshah; Kurdistan; Lorestan; Hamadan; Markazi; Qom; Isfahan; Semnam; South Khorasan; Razavi Khorasan
34°0′N 60°30′E	Afghanistan	
34°0′N 69°54′E	Pakistan	Khyber Pakhtunkhwa
34°0′N 70°10′E	Afghanistan	
34°0′N 70°55′E	Pakistan	Khyber Pakhtunkhwa - for about 8 km (5.0 mi); Khyber Pakhtunkhwa; Punjab - for about 3 km (1.9 mi); Azad Kashmir - claimed by India
34°0′N 74°15′E	India	Jammu and Kashmir - Passing through Srinagar-claimed by Pakistan; Ladakh - claimed by Pakistan
34°0′N 78°45′E	Aksai Chin	Disputed between India and China
34°0′N 78°54′E	China	Tibet; Qinghai; Sichuan − for about 4 km (2.5 mi); Qinghai; Gansu; Sichuan; Gansu; Shaanxi; Henan; Anhui; Henan; Anhui; Jiangsu − for about 5 km (3.1 mi); Anhui − for about 4 km (2.5 mi); Jiangsu
34°0′N 120°23′E	East China Sea	Passing by several islands of South Korea
34°0′N 127°19′E	South Korea	Port Hamilton islands
34°0′N 127°20′E	Korea Strait	Passing just south of Tsushima Island, Japan
34°0′N 130°55′E	Japan	Island of Honshū: — Yamaguchi Prefecture - passing through the northern suburbs of Shimonoseki; Island of Shikoku: — Ehime Prefecture — Tokushima Prefecture; Island of Honshū: — Wakayama Prefecture — Nara Prefecture — Mie Prefecture
34°0′N 136°16′E	Pacific Ocean	Passing between the islands of Miyakejima and Mikurajima, Japan; Passing just south of San Miguel Island, California, United States
34°0′N 120°14′W	United States	California - Santa Rosa Island and Santa Cruz Island
34°0′N 119°33′W	Pacific Ocean	Passing just south of Anacapa Island, California, United States
34°0′N 118°29′W	United States	California - passing through Los Angeles; Arizona; New Mexico; Texas - passing through Sheppard AFB; Oklahoma - passing through Durant and Hugo; Arkansas; Mississippi; Alabama; Georgia - passing through Kennesaw and Athens; South Carolina - passing through Columbia; North Carolina - passing through Kure Beach
34°0′N 77°54′W	Atlantic Ocean	
34°0′N 6°53′W	Morocco	Passing through Rabat and Fez
34°0′N 1°40′W	Algeria	

== 35th parallel north ==
35th parallel north (interactive map)

In the United States the 35th parallel defines the southern border of Tennessee, part of the southern border of North Carolina, and the northern borders of Mississippi, Alabama and Georgia.

The 35th parallel north is a circle of latitude that is 35 degrees north of the Earth's equatorial plane. It crosses Africa, the Mediterranean Sea, Asia, the Pacific Ocean, North America and the Atlantic Ocean.

In the United States, the parallel defines the southern border of Tennessee, and the border between North Carolina and Georgia, as well as the tripoint of Arizona–California–Nevada.

At this northern latitude, the Sun is visible for 14 hours, 31 minutes on its summer solstice (in June) and for 9 hours, 48 minutes on its winter solstice (in December).

This parallel is sometimes used to define the northern boundary of the subtropics.

=== Around the world ===
Starting at the Prime Meridian and heading eastwards, the parallel 35° north passes through:

Coordinates	Country, territory or sea	Notes
35°0′N 0°0′E	Algeria	
35°0′N 8°19′E	Tunisia	
35°0′N 10°58′E	Mediterranean Sea	
35°0′N 24°45′E	Greece	Island of Crete
35°0′N 25°34′E	Mediterranean Sea	
35°0′N 32°18′E	Cyprus	Including, for a short distance, the United Nations Buffer Zone in Cyprus
35°0′N 33°43′E	Dhekelia	United Kingdom Sovereign Base Area (not part of the territory of the Republic of Cyprus)
35°0′N 33°51′E	Cyprus	
35°0′N 34°4′E	Mediterranean Sea	
35°0′N 35°54′E	Syria	
35°0′N 41°14′E	Iraq	
35°0′N 45°53′E	Iran	Passing through Saveh
35°0′N 61°7′E	Afghanistan	
35°0′N 71°31′E	Pakistan	Khyber Pakhtunkhwa; Azad Kashmir – claimed by India; Gilgit-Baltistan – claimed by India
35°0′N 77°1′E	India	Ladakh – claimed by Pakistan
35°0′N 78°7′E	Aksai Chin	Disputed between India and China
35°0′N 80°11′E	China	Tibet; Qinghai; Gansu; Shaanxi; Gansu; Shaanxi; Shanxi; Henan; Shandong; Jiangsu
35°0′N 119°12′E	Yellow Sea	
35°0′N 126°6′E	South Korea	South Jeolla Province passing through Muan Airport South Gyeongsang Province passing just south of Busan
35°0′N 128°50′E	Sea of Japan	
35°0′N 132°12′E	Japan	Island of Honshu: — Shimane Prefecture — Hiroshima Prefecture — Okayama Prefecture — Hyōgo Prefecture — Osaka Prefecture — Kyoto Prefecture – passing through central Kyoto city — Shiga Prefecture – passing through central Ōtsu city — Mie Prefecture — Aichi Prefecture — Shizuoka Prefecture – passing just north of Shizuoka city
35°0′N 139°6′E	Pacific Ocean	Sagami Bay
35°0′N 139°51′E	Japan	Island of Honshu: — Chiba Prefecture – the southern tip of the Bōsō Peninsula
35°0′N 139°59′E	Pacific Ocean	
35°0′N 120°38′W	United States	California – passing just north of Santa Maria; Arizona–California–Nevada tripoint Arizona; New Mexico – passing just south of Albuquerque; Texas; Oklahoma; Arkansas; Tennessee / Mississippi border - passing through the Memphis metropolitan area Tennessee / Alabama border Tennessee / Georgia border - passing through the Chattanooga metropolitan area North Carolina / Georgia border South Carolina; North Carolina – passing through Fayetteville
35°0′N 76°8′W	Atlantic Ocean	
35°0′N 6°15′W	Morocco	Passing through Ksar el-Kebir
35°0′N 2°8′W	Algeria	

== See also ==
- Circles of latitude between the 25th parallel north and the 30th parallel north
- Circles of latitude between the 35th parallel north and the 40th parallel north
- Country Club Dispute
