= Circles of latitude between the 30th parallel south and the 35th parallel south =

Circles of latitude

Following are circles of latitude between the 30th parallel south and the 35th parallel south:

== 31st parallel south ==
31st parallel south (interactive map)

The 31st parallel south is a circle of latitude that is 31 degrees south of the Earth's equatorial plane. It crosses the Atlantic Ocean, Africa, the Indian Ocean, Australasia, the Pacific Ocean and South America.

At this latitude the sun is visible for 14 hours, 13 minutes during the December solstice and 10 hours, 4 minutes during the June solstice.

=== Around the world ===
Starting at the Prime Meridian and heading eastwards, the parallel 31° south passes through:

Coordinates	Country, territory or ocean	Notes
31°0′S 0°0′E	Atlantic Ocean	
31°0′S 17°40′E	South Africa	Northern Cape - for about 20 km Western Cape; Northern Cape; Eastern Cape; KwaZulu-Natal - for about 13 km
31°0′S 30°16′E	Indian Ocean	
31°0′S 115°19′E	Australia	Western Australia; South Australia; New South Wales – Passing just north of Kempsey
31°0′S 153°2′E	Pacific Ocean	
31°0′S 71°39′W	Chile	Coquimbo Region
31°0′S 70°17′W	Argentina	San Juan Province; La Rioja Province; Córdoba Province; Santa Fe Province; Entre Ríos Province Passing near the cities of Paraná (31°44′S 60°32′W) and Santa Fe (31°38′S 60°42′W).
31°0′S 57°52′W	Uruguay	
31°0′S 55°53′W	Brazil	Rio Grande do Sul - for about 13 km
31°0′S 55°45′W	Uruguay	
31°0′S 55°26′W	Brazil	Rio Grande do Sul
31°0′S 50°41′W	Atlantic Ocean	

== 32nd parallel south ==
32nd parallel south (interactive map)

The 32nd parallel south is a circle of latitude that is 32 degrees south of the Earth's equatorial plane. It crosses the Atlantic Ocean, Africa, the Indian Ocean, Australasia, the Pacific Ocean and South America.

At this latitude the sun is visible for 14 hours, 19 minutes during the December solstice and 9 hours, 58 minutes during the June solstice.

=== Around the world ===
Starting at the Prime Meridian and heading eastwards, the parallel 32° south passes through:

Coordinates	Country, territory or ocean	Notes
32°0′S 0°0′E	Atlantic Ocean	
32°0′S 18°17′E	South Africa	Western Cape; Northern Cape; Eastern Cape
32°0′S 29°8′E	Indian Ocean	
32°0′S 115°29′E	Australia	Western Australia – Rottnest Island
32°0′S 115°33′E	Indian Ocean	
32°0′S 115°45′E	Australia	Western Australia – passing through Perth
32°0′S 128°15′E	Indian Ocean	Great Australian Bight
32°0′S 132°9′E	Australia	South Australia
32°0′S 132°26′E	Indian Ocean	Great Australian Bight
32°0′S 132°51′E	Australia	South Australia; New South Wales – Passing just south of Taree
32°0′S 152°34′E	Pacific Ocean	Passing just south of Ball's Pyramid, Australia
32°0′S 71°31′W	Chile	
32°0′S 70°14′W	Argentina	Passing just south of Rosario (32°57′S 60°40′W)
32°0′S 58°9′W	Uruguay	
32°0′S 53°51′W	Brazil	Rio Grande do Sul
32°0′S 51°56′W	Atlantic Ocean	

== 33rd parallel south ==
33rd parallel south (interactive map)

The 33rd parallel south is a circle of latitude that is 33 degrees south of the Earth's equatorial plane. It crosses the Atlantic Ocean, Africa, the Indian Ocean, Australasia, the Pacific Ocean and South America.

=== Around the world ===
Starting at the Prime Meridian and heading eastwards, the parallel 33° south passes through:

Coordinates	Country, territory or ocean	Notes
33°0′S 0°0′E	Atlantic Ocean	
33°0′S 17°52′E	South Africa	Western Cape; Eastern Cape - passing through East London at 32°59′S 27°52′E
33°0′S 27°57′E	Indian Ocean	
33°0′S 115°40′E	Australia	Western Australia
33°0′S 124°17′E	Indian Ocean	Great Australian Bight
33°0′S 134°12′E	Australia	South Australia - passing 3 kilometers north of Whyalla (at 33°2′0″S 137°34′0″E) and 2 kilometers north of Port Germein (at 33°1′0″S 138°0′0″E); New South Wales - passing south of Newcastle (at 32°55′50″S 151°45′15″E)
33°0′S 151°44′E	Pacific Ocean	
33°0′S 71°34′W	Chile	Valparaíso Region – passing through Viña del Mar (at 33°0′0″S 71°32′30″W); Santiago Metropolitan Region; Valparaíso Region
33°0′S 70°1′W	Argentina	Mendoza Province; San Luis Province; Córdoba Province; Santa Fe Province; Entre Ríos Province
33°0′S 58°5′W	Uruguay	
33°0′S 53°21′W	Brazil	Rio Grande do Sul
33°0′S 52°34′W	Atlantic Ocean	

== 34th parallel south ==
34th parallel south (interactive map)

The 34th parallel south is a circle of latitude that is 34 degrees south of the Earth's equatorial plane. It crosses the Atlantic Ocean, Africa, the Indian Ocean, Australasia, the Pacific Ocean and South America.

At this latitude the Sun is visible for 14 hours, 28 minutes during the December solstice and 9 hours, 50 minutes during the June solstice. South of this latitude, the constellation Crux is circumpolar (never sets below the horizon). On 21 June, the maximum altitude of the Sun is 32.17 degrees, while it's 79.83 degrees on 21 December.

=== Around the world ===
Starting at the Prime Meridian and heading eastwards, the parallel 34° south passes through:

Co-ordinates	Country, territory or ocean	Notes
34°0′S 0°0′E	Atlantic Ocean	
34°0′S 18°20′E	South Africa	Western Cape – passing through Cape Town (at 34°0′S 18°33′E)
34°0′S 23°30′E	Indian Ocean	
23°45′S 18°20′E	South Africa	Eastern Cape
34°0′S 24°56′E	Indian Ocean	St Francis Bay
23°45′S 25°19′E	South Africa	Eastern Cape – passing just south of Port Elizabeth (at 33°57′S 25°36′E)
34°0′S 25°41′E	Indian Ocean	
34°0′S 115°0′E	Australia	Western Australia
34°0′S 119°48′E	Indian Ocean	
34°0′S 122°6′E	Australia	Western Australia – Cape Le Grand
34°0′S 122°17′E	Indian Ocean	
34°0′S 123°10′E	Australia	Western Australia – Cape Arid
34°0′S 123°13′E	Indian Ocean	Great Australian Bight
34°0′S 135°15′E	Australia	South Australia – Eyre Peninsula
34°0′S 136°29′E	Indian Ocean	Spencer Gulf
34°0′S 137°32′E	Australia	South Australia; New South Wales – from 34°0′S 141°0′E, passing just south of Sydney (at 33°51′S 151°12′E)
34°0′S 151°15′E	Pacific Ocean	Passing just north of the Three Kings Islands, New Zealand (at 34°8′S 172°8′E); Passing just south of Alejandro Selkirk Island, Chile (at 33°49′S 80°47′W)
34°0′S 71°54′W	Chile	O'Higgins Region
34°0′S 69°51′W	Argentina	Mendoza Province - San Luis Province - Cordoba Province - Santa Fe Province - Buenos Aires Province - Autonomous City of Buenos Aires
34°0′S 58°22′W	Uruguay	Passing through Laguna Negra (at 34°0′S 53°41′W) - Carmelo (at 34°0′S 58°17′W)
34°0′S 53°31′W	Atlantic Ocean	

== 35th parallel south ==
35th parallel south (interactive map)

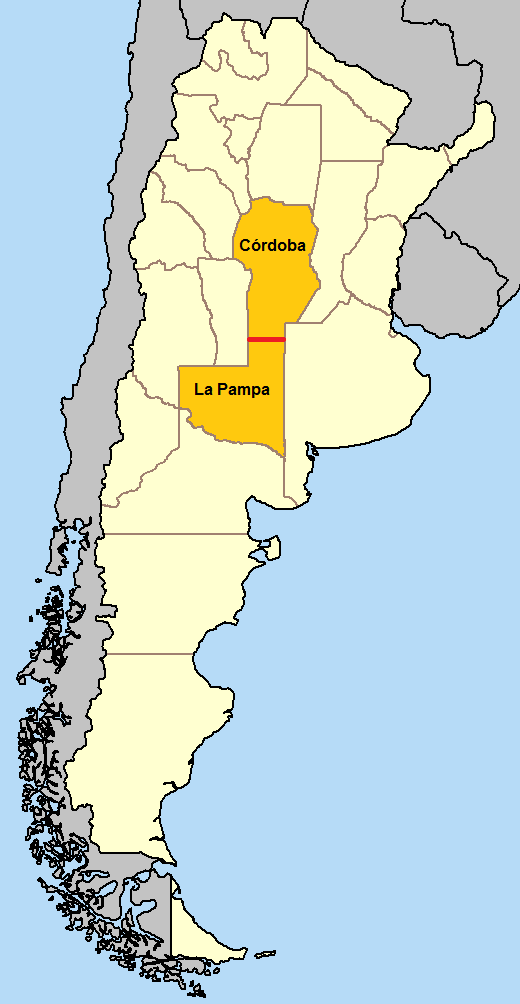
In Argentina, the 35th parallel south defines the border between Córdoba Province and La Pampa Province.

The 35th parallel south is a circle of latitude that is 35 degrees south of the Earth's equatorial plane. It crosses the Atlantic Ocean, the Indian Ocean, Australasia, the Pacific Ocean and South America.

At this latitude the sun is visible for 14 hours, 31 minutes during the December solstice and 9 hours, 48 minutes during the June solstice.

This parallel is sometimes used to define the southern boundary of the subtropics.

=== Around the world ===
Starting at the Prime Meridian and heading eastwards, the parallel 35° south passes through:

Coordinates	Country, territory or ocean	Notes
35°0′S 0°0′E	Atlantic Ocean	
35°0′S 20°0′E	Indian Ocean	
35°0′S 116°28′E	Australia	Western Australia - passing through the northern suburbs of Albany and just south of Denmark and Walpole
35°0′S 118°12′E	Indian Ocean	
35°0′S 135°56′E	Australia	South Australia - Eyre Peninsula and Thistle Island
35°0′S 136°10′E	Indian Ocean	Spencer Gulf
35°0′S 136°58′E	Australia	South Australia - Yorke Peninsula
35°0′S 137°45′E	Indian Ocean	Gulf St Vincent
35°0′S 138°30′E	Australia	South Australia - the southern part of the Adelaide metropolitan region From west to east: directly through the Prep School Oval of Westminster School; Centennial Park Cemetery; Belair National Park; half a kilometer north of the town of Stirling in the Adelaide Hills; Victoria; New South Wales; Australian Capital Territory
35°0′S 150°47′E	Pacific Ocean	Tasman Sea
35°0′S 173°9′E	New Zealand	North Island, just north of Ahipara Beach, crossing through Awanui, Whangaroa Harbour, Mangonui and Butlers Point, Northland. The town of Kaitaia (population circa 5,000) is 7 kilometers to the south.
35°0′S 173°57′E	Pacific Ocean	
35°0′S 72°11′W	Chile	O'Higgins Region - passing just south of Curicó
35°0′S 70°21′W	Argentina	The parallel defines the border between Córdoba Province and La Pampa Province; Passing just south of La Plata
35°0′S 57°35′W	Atlantic Ocean	Río de la Plata estuary - passing just south of Montevideo, Uruguay; Passing between Punta del Este and Isla de Lobos, Uruguay

== See also ==
- Circles of latitude between the 25th parallel south and the 30th parallel south
- Circles of latitude between the 35th parallel south and the 40th parallel south
