= Circles of latitude between the 50th parallel south and the 60th parallel south =

Circles of latitude

Following are circles of latitude between the 50th parallel south and the 60th parallel south. These circles of latitude generally pass through the southernmost portion of South America as well as minor islands, though higher latitudes generally cross only open ocean.

== 51st parallel south ==
51st parallel south (interactive map)

The 51st parallel south is a circle of latitude that is 51 degrees south of the Earth's equatorial plane. It crosses the Atlantic Ocean, the Indian Ocean, the Pacific Ocean and South America.

At this latitude the sun is visible for 16 hours, 33 minutes during the December solstice and 7 hours, 55 minutes during the June solstice.

=== Around the world ===
Starting at the Prime Meridian and heading eastwards, the parallel 51° south passes through:

Coordinates	Country, territory or ocean	Notes
51°0′S 0°0′E	Atlantic Ocean	
51°0′S 20°0′E	Indian Ocean	
51°0′S 147°0′E	Pacific Ocean	Passing just south of Adams Island, Auckland Islands, New Zealand
51°0′S 75°5′W	Chile	Patagonic Archipelago and mainland, Magallanes Region
51°0′S 72°15′W	Argentina	Santa Cruz Province
51°0′S 69°9′W	Atlantic Ocean	Passing just north of the Jason Islands, Falkland Islands (UK Territory claimed by Argentina)

== 52nd parallel south ==
52nd parallel south (interactive map)

The 52nd parallel south is a circle of latitude that is 52 degrees south of the Earth's equatorial plane. It crosses the Atlantic Ocean, the Indian Ocean, the Pacific Ocean and South America.

The parallel defines part of the border between Argentina and Chile.

At this latitude the sun is visible for 16 hours, 44 minutes during the December solstice and 7 hours, 44 minutes during the June solstice.

=== Around the world ===
Starting at the Prime Meridian and heading eastwards, the parallel 52° south passes through:

Coordinates	Country, territory or ocean	Notes
52°0′S 0°0′E	Atlantic Ocean	
52°0′S 20°0′E	Indian Ocean	
52°0′S 147°0′E	Pacific Ocean	
52°0′S 75°4′W	Chile	Patagonic Archipelago and mainland, Magallanes Region
52°0′S 71°55′W	Argentina / Chile border	
52°0′S 70°0′W	Argentina	Santa Cruz Province
52°0′S 68°42′W	Atlantic Ocean	
52°0′S 60°57′W	Falkland Islands	Dyke Island and West Falkland (claimed by Argentina)
52°0′S 59°57′W	Atlantic Ocean	Falkland Sound
52°0′S 59°35′W	Falkland Islands	East Falkland and Lively Island (claimed by Argentina)
52°0′S 58°21′W	Atlantic Ocean	

== 53rd parallel south ==
53rd parallel south (interactive map)

The 53rd parallel south is a circle of latitude that is 53 degrees south of the Earth's equatorial plane. It crosses the Atlantic Ocean, the Indian Ocean, the Pacific Ocean and South America.

At this latitude the sun is visible for 16 hours, 56 minutes during the December solstice and 7 hours, 34 minutes during the June solstice. Approximately 53º18' South, 33 km (21 mi) south of this parallel, during the December summer solstice, the sun is visible for 17 hours exactly. If the latitude in the southern hemisphere is 53º47' or smaller, it is possible to view both astronomical dawn and dusk every day of the month of February.

=== Around the world ===
Starting at the Prime Meridian and heading eastwards, the parallel 53° south passes through:

Coordinates	Country, territory or ocean	Notes
53°0′S 0°0′E	Atlantic Ocean	
53°0′S 20°0′E	Indian Ocean	Passing just north of the McDonald Islands, Australia
53°0′S 73°15′E	Australia	Heard Island
53°0′S 73°25′E	Indian Ocean	
53°0′S 169°9′E	Pacific Ocean	Passing just south of Campbell Island, New Zealand
53°0′S 74°28′W	Chile	Desolación Island, Magallanes Region
53°0′S 73°57′W	Pacific Ocean	Strait of Magellan
53°0′S 73°25′W	Chile	Muñoz Gamero Peninsula and Riesco Island, Magallanes Region
53°0′S 71°52′W	Pacific Ocean	Seno Otway
53°0′S 71°15′W	Chile	Brunswick Peninsula, Magallanes Region
53°0′S 70°49′W	Pacific Ocean	Strait of Magellan
53°0′S 70°24′W	Chile	Isla Grande de Tierra del Fuego, Magallanes Region
53°0′S 68°36′W	Argentina	Isla Grande de Tierra del Fuego, Tierra del Fuego Province
53°0′S 68°15′W	Atlantic Ocean	Passing just south of Beauchene Island, Falkland Islands (claimed by Argentina)

== 54th parallel south ==
54th parallel south (interactive map)

The 54th parallel south is a circle of latitude that is 54 degrees south of the Earth's equatorial plane. It crosses the Atlantic Ocean, the Indian Ocean, the Pacific Ocean and South America.

At this latitude the sun is visible for 17 hours, 9 minutes during the December solstice and 7 hours, 22 minutes during the June solstice.

=== Around the world ===
Starting at the Prime Meridian and heading eastwards, the parallel 54° south passes through:

Coordinates	Country, territory or ocean	Notes
54°0′S 0°0′E	Atlantic Ocean	Passing north of Bouvet Island, Norway
54°0′S 20°0′E	Indian Ocean	Passing just north of Macquarie Island, Australia
54°0′S 147°0′E	Pacific Ocean	
54°0′S 73°9′W	Chile	Santa Inés Island, Clarence Island and Aracena Island, Magallanes Region
54°0′S 71°16′W	Pacific Ocean	Strait of Magellan
54°0′S 70°52′W	Chile	Dawson Island, Magallanes Region
54°0′S 70°20′W	Pacific Ocean	Canal Whiteside
54°0′S 70°5′W	Chile	Isla Grande de Tierra del Fuego, Magallanes Region
54°0′S 68°37′W	Argentina	Isla Grande de Tierra del Fuego, Tierra del Fuego Province
54°0′S 67°24′W	Atlantic Ocean	
54°0′S 38°12′W	South Georgia and the South Sandwich Islands	Willis Islands, Bird Island and South Georgia
54°0′S 37°23′W	Atlantic Ocean	

== 55th parallel south ==
55th parallel south (interactive map)

The 55th parallel south is a circle of latitude that is 55 degrees south of the Earth's equatorial plane. It crosses the Atlantic Ocean, the Indian Ocean, the Pacific Ocean and South America.

At this latitude the sun is visible for 17 hours, 22 minutes during the December solstice and 7 hours, 10 minutes during the June solstice.

=== Around the world ===
Starting at the Prime Meridian and heading eastwards, the parallel 55° south passes through:

Coordinates	Country, territory or ocean	Notes
55°0′S 0°0′E	Atlantic Ocean	Passing south of Bouvet Island, Norway
55°0′S 20°0′E	Indian Ocean	
55°0′S 147°0′E	Pacific Ocean	Passing just south of Macquarie Island, Australia; Passing just north of Bishop and Clerk Islets, Australia
55°0′S 71°14′W	Chile	Islands of Gilbert, Londonderry, London, Thompson, Gordon, Hoste, Navarino and Picton, Magallanes Region
55°0′S 67°0′W	Pacific Ocean	Beagle Channel
55°0′S 66°42′W	Argentina	Isla Grande de Tierra del Fuego, Tierra del Fuego Province
55°0′S 66°23′W	Atlantic Ocean	Passing just south of Isla de los Estados, Argentina; Passing just south of the island of South Georgia, South Georgia and the South Sandwich Islands (claimed by Argentina)

== 56th parallel south ==
56th parallel south (interactive map)

The 56th parallel south is a circle of latitude that is 56 degrees south of the Earth's equatorial plane. No land lies on the parallel — it crosses nothing but ocean.

At this latitude the sun is visible for 17 hours, 37 minutes during the December solstice and 6 hours, 57 minutes during the June solstice.

The longest continuous east–west distance at sea is along this latitude, at 55°59'S. (see Extremes on Earth § Along constant latitude)

=== Around the world ===
Starting at the Prime Meridian and heading eastwards, the parallel 56° south passes through:

Coordinates	Ocean	Notes
56°0′S 0°0′E	Atlantic Ocean	
56°0′S 20°0′E	Indian Ocean	
56°0′S 147°0′E	Pacific Ocean	Passing through the Drake Passage between South America and Antarctic Peninsula
56°0′S 67°17′W	Pacific Ocean	Passing approximately 2 kilometers south of Hornos Island (Cape Horn), Chile
56°0′S 67°16′W	Atlantic Ocean	Running through the Scotia Sea.
56°0′S 36°6′W	Atlantic Ocean	Passing approximately 122 kilometers south of South Georgia, South Georgia and the South Sandwich Islands (claimed by Argentina).

== 57th parallel south ==
57th parallel south (interactive map)

The 57th parallel south is a circle of latitude that is 57 degrees south of the Earth's equatorial plane. No land lies on the parallel — it crosses nothing but ocean.

At this latitude the sun is visible for 17 hours, 53 minutes during the December solstice and 6 hours, 43 minutes during the June solstice. On December 21, the sun is at 56.44 degrees in the sky and on June 21, the sun is at 9.56 degrees in the sky. During the summer solstice, nighttime does not get beyond nautical twilight, a condition which lasts throughout the month of December. It is possible to view both astronomical dawn and dusk every day of the month of October. The maximum altitude of the Sun is >18.00° in April and >11.00° in May.

=== Around the world ===
Starting at the Prime Meridian and heading eastwards, the parallel 57° south passes through:

Coordinates	Ocean	Notes
57°0′S 0°0′E	Atlantic Ocean	
57°0′S 20°0′E	Indian Ocean	
57°0′S 147°0′E	Pacific Ocean	Passing through the Drake Passage between South America and the Antarctic Peninsula
57°0′S 67°16′W	Atlantic Ocean	Running through the Scotia Sea, passing 8 kilometers north of Vindication Island and Candlemas Island, South Georgia and the South Sandwich Islands (claimed by Argentina)

== 58th parallel south ==
58th parallel south (interactive map)

The 58th parallel south is a circle of latitude that is 58 degrees south of the Earth's equatorial plane. No land lies on the parallel — it crosses nothing but ocean.

At this latitude the sun is visible for 18 hours, 11 minutes during the December solstice and 6 hours, 27 minutes during the June solstice.

=== Around the world ===
Starting at the Prime Meridian and heading eastwards, the parallel 58° south passes through:

Coordinates	Ocean	Notes
58°0′S 0°0′E	Atlantic Ocean	
58°0′S 20°0′E	Indian Ocean	
58°0′S 147°0′E	Pacific Ocean	Passing through the Drake Passage between South America and the Antarctic Peninsula
58°0′S 67°16′W	Atlantic Ocean	Running through the Scotia Sea, passing between Saunders Island and Montagu Island, South Georgia and the South Sandwich Islands (claimed by Argentina)

== 59th parallel south ==
59th parallel south (interactive map)

The 59th parallel south is a circle of latitude that is 59 degrees south of the Earth's equatorial plane. The only landmass on this parallel is Bristol Island. (Note: The parallel appears to cut through the boundary of the island as shown on Google Earth.)

At this latitude the sun is visible for 18 hours, 30 minutes during the December solstice and 6 hours, 10 minutes during the June solstice.

=== Around the world ===
Starting at the Prime Meridian and heading eastwards, the parallel 59° south passes through:

Coordinates	Territory or ocean	Notes
59°0′S 0°0′E	Atlantic Ocean	
59°0′S 20°0′E	Indian Ocean	
59°0′S 147°0′E	Pacific Ocean	Passing through the Drake Passage between South America and the Antarctic Peninsula
59°0′S 67°16′W	Atlantic Ocean	Running through the Scotia Sea
59°0′S 26°37′W	South Georgia and the South Sandwich Islands	Bristol Island (claimed by Argentina)
59°0′S 26°35′W	Atlantic Ocean	

== 60th parallel south ==
60th parallel south (interactive map)

The 60th parallel south is a circle of latitude that is 60 degrees south of Earth's equatorial plane. No land lies on the parallel—it crosses nothing but ocean. The closest land is a group of rocks north of Coronation Island (Melson Rocks or Governor Islands) of the South Orkney Islands, which are about 54 km south of the parallel, and Thule Island and Cook Island of the South Sandwich Islands, which both are about 57 km north of the parallel (with Cook Island slightly closer).

The parallel marks the northern limit of the Southern Ocean (though some organisations and countries, notably Australia, have other definitions) and of the Antarctic Treaty System. It also marks the southern boundary of the South Pacific Nuclear-Weapon-Free Zone and the Latin American Nuclear-Weapon-Free Zone.

At this latitude the sun is visible for 18 hours, 52 minutes during the December solstice and 5 hours, 52 minutes during the June solstice. On December 21, the sun is at 53.44 degrees up in the sky and 6.56 degrees on June 21. The sun's altitude is exactly 30 degrees at either equinox.

The latitudes south of this parallel are often referred to as the Screaming 60s due to the prevailing high-speed, westerly winds which can generate large waves in excess of 15 m (50 ft) and peak wind speeds over 145 km/h (90 mph).

The maximum altitude of the Sun is >15.00° in April and >8.00° in May.

The lowest latitude where white nights can be observed is approximately on this parallel.

During the summer solstice, nighttime does not get beyond nautical twilight, a condition which lasts throughout the month of December. It is possible to view both astronomical dawn and dusk every day between February 17 and October 24.

=== Around the world ===
Starting at the prime meridian and heading eastwards, the parallel 60° south passes through:

Coordinates	Ocean	Notes
60°0′S 0°0′E	The Prime Meridian	
60°0′S 20°0′E	the boundary of the Atlantic and Indian Oceans	
60°0′S 147°0′E	the boundary of the Indian and Pacific Oceans	Additionally passes through the Pacific Ocean at the Drake Passage between South America and the Antarctic Peninsula
60°0′S 67°16′W	the boundary of the Pacific and Atlantic Oceans	Running close to the southern border of the Scotia Sea and the South Orkney Islands, South Georgia and the South Sandwich Islands (claimed by Argentina)

== See also ==
- Circles of latitude between the 45th parallel south and the 50th parallel south
- Antarctic circles of latitude
