= Antarctic circles of latitude =

Circles of latitude

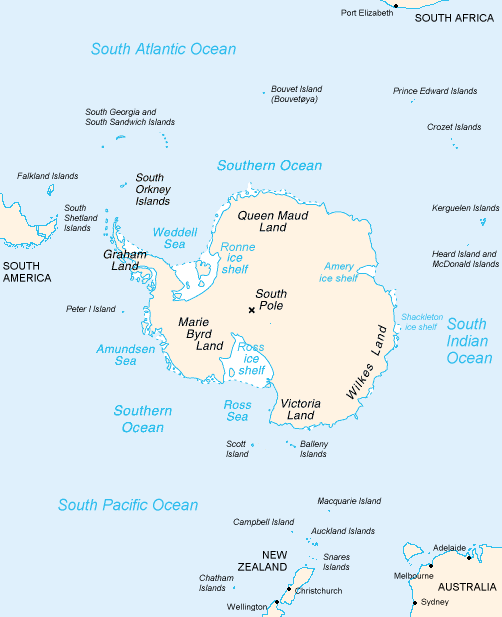
Circles of latitude below the 70th parallel S are all in the region of Antarctica

The following are circles of latitude between the 60th parallel south and the South Pole. Although the 55th parallel south, crossing the southernmost point of Chile, is the last line of latitude moving southward to touch any part of any continent other than Antarctica, the 60th parallel south defines the northern limit of the Antarctic Treaty System and thus the political boundary of Antarctica.

== 60th parallel south to 65th parallel south ==
=== 61st parallel south ===
61st parallel south (interactive map)

The 61st parallel south is a circle of latitude that is 61 degrees south of the Earth's equatorial plane. No land lies on the parallel—it crosses nothing but the Southern Ocean.

At this latitude the sun is visible for 19 hours, 16 minutes during the December solstice and 5 hours, 32 minutes during the June solstice. On the December solstice, the sun's altitude is 52.44 degrees and on the June solstice, it is 5.56 degrees.

The lowest latitude where civil twilight can last all night lies approximately on this parallel.

Starting at the Prime Meridian and heading eastwards, the parallel 61° south passes through:

Coordinates	Ocean	Notes
61°0′S 0°0′E	Southern Ocean	South of the Atlantic Ocean
61°0′S 20°0′E	Southern Ocean	South of the Indian Ocean
61°0′S 147°0′E	Southern Ocean	South of the Pacific Ocean; Passing through the Drake Passage between South America and the Antarctic Peninsula
61°0′S 67°16′W	Southern Ocean	South of the Atlantic Ocean; Passing just north of Elephant Island, and Clarence Island (claimed by Argentina, Chile and United Kingdom); Passing just south of the South Orkney Islands, South Georgia and the South Sandwich Islands (claimed by Argentina)

=== 62nd parallel south ===
62nd parallel south (interactive map)

The 62nd parallel south is a circle of latitude that is 62 degrees south of the Earth's equatorial plane. It crosses the Southern Ocean and Antarctica.

At this latitude the sun is visible for 19 hours, 45 minutes during the December solstice and 5 hours, 9 minutes during the June solstice.

Starting at the Prime Meridian and heading eastwards, the parallel 62° south passes through:

Coordinates	Continent or ocean	Notes
62°0′S 0°0′E	Southern Ocean	South of the Atlantic Ocean
62°0′S 20°0′E	Southern Ocean	South of the Indian Ocean
62°0′S 147°0′E	Southern Ocean	South of the Pacific Ocean; Passing through the Drake Passage between South America and the Antarctic Peninsula
62°0′S 67°16′W	Southern Ocean	South of the Atlantic Ocean
62°0′S 58°36′W	Antarctica	King George Island, claimed by Argentina, Chile and United Kingdom
62°0′S 57°39′W	Southern Ocean	South of the Atlantic Ocean

=== 63rd parallel south ===
63rd parallel south (interactive map)

The 63rd parallel south is a circle of latitude that is 63 degrees south of the Earth's equatorial plane. It crosses the Southern Ocean and Antarctica.

At this latitude the sun is visible for 20 hours, 19 minutes during the December solstice and 4 hours, 42 minutes during the June solstice. If the latitude in the southern hemisphere is 63°26' or smaller, it is possible to view both astronomical dawn and dusk every day of the month of March.

Starting at the Prime Meridian and heading eastwards, the parallel 63° south passes through:

Coordinates	Continent or ocean	Notes
63°0′S 0°0′E	Southern Ocean	South of the Atlantic Ocean
63°0′S 20°0′E	Southern Ocean	South of the Indian Ocean
63°0′S 147°0′E	Southern Ocean	South of the Pacific Ocean
63°0′S 67°16′W	Southern Ocean	South of the Atlantic Ocean
63°0′S 62°36′W	Antarctica	Smith Island, claimed by Argentina, Chile and United Kingdom
63°0′S 62°28′W	Southern Ocean	South of the Atlantic Ocean
63°0′S 60°42′W	Antarctica	Deception Island, claimed by Argentina, Chile and United Kingdom
63°0′S 60°33′W	Southern Ocean	South of the Atlantic Ocean, passing 24 km north of Prime Head, Antarctic Peninsula
63°0′S 56°30′W	Antarctica	D'Urville Island, claimed by Argentina, Chile and United Kingdom
63°0′S 56°8′W	Southern Ocean	South of the Atlantic Ocean

=== 64th parallel south ===
64th parallel south (interactive map)

The 64th parallel south is a circle of latitude that is 64 degrees south of the Earth's equatorial plane. It crosses the Southern Ocean and the Antarctic mainland, the latter as the most northern latitude.

At this latitude the sun is visible for 21 hours, 1 minute during the December solstice and 4 hours, 12 minutes during the June solstice.

Starting at the Prime Meridian and heading eastwards, the parallel 64° south passes through:

Coordinates	Continent or ocean	Notes
64°0′S 0°0′E	Southern Ocean	South of the Atlantic Ocean
64°0′S 20°0′E	Southern Ocean	South of the Indian Ocean
64°0′S 147°0′E	Southern Ocean	South of the Pacific Ocean
64°0′S 67°16′W	Southern Ocean	South of the Atlantic Ocean; Passing just north of Brabant Island, Antarctica
64°0′S 60°35′W	Antarctica	Antarctic Peninsula and James Ross Island, claimed by Argentina, Chile and United Kingdom
64°0′S 57°31′W	Southern Ocean	South of the Atlantic Ocean

=== 65th parallel south ===
65th parallel south (interactive map)

The 65th parallel south is a circle of latitude that is 65 degrees south of the Earth's equatorial plane. It crosses the Southern Ocean and Antarctica.

At this latitude the sun is visible for 22 hours, 2 minutes during the December solstice and 3 hours, 35 minutes during the June solstice.

Starting at the Prime Meridian and heading eastwards, the parallel 65° south passes through:

Coordinates	Continent or ocean	Notes
65°0′S 0°0′E	Southern Ocean	South of the Atlantic Ocean
65°0′S 20°0′E	Southern Ocean	South of the Indian Ocean
65°0′S 147°0′E	Southern Ocean	South of the Pacific Ocean
65°0′S 67°16′W	Southern Ocean	South of the Atlantic Ocean
65°0′S 63°12′W	Antarctica	Antarctic Peninsula, claimed by Argentina, Chile and United Kingdom
65°0′S 59°3′W	Southern Ocean	South of the Atlantic Ocean

== 65th parallel south to 70th parallel south ==
=== 66th parallel south ===
66th parallel south (interactive map)

The 66th parallel south is a circle of latitude that is 66 degrees south of the Earth's equatorial plane, about 61 km north of the Antarctic Circle. It crosses the Southern Ocean and Antarctica.

This latitude also roughly corresponds to the minimum latitude in which midnight sun can last all night near the summer solstice.

At this latitude the sun rises on December 13 and does not set again until December 30.

Starting at the Prime Meridian and heading eastwards, the parallel 66° south passes through:

Coordinates	Continent or ocean	Notes
66°0′S 0°0′E	Southern Ocean	South of the Atlantic Ocean
66°0′S 20°0′E	Southern Ocean	South of the Indian Ocean
66°0′S 52°0′E	Antarctica	Enderby Land, territory claimed by Australia
66°0′S 55°45′E	Southern Ocean	South of the Indian Ocean
66°0′S 81°36′E	Antarctica	Princess Elizabeth Land, territory claimed by Australia
66°0′S 82°32′E	Southern Ocean	South of the Indian Ocean
66°0′S 87°45′E	Antarctica	Wilhelm II Land, territory claimed by Australia
66°0′S 88°1′E	Southern Ocean	South of the Indian Ocean, passing just south of Drygalski Island
66°0′S 95°30′E	Antarctica	Queen Mary Land, territory claimed by Australia
66°0′S 104°8′E	Southern Ocean	South of the Indian Ocean
66°0′S 111°8′E	Antarctica	Wilkes Land, territory claimed by Australia
66°0′S 113°52′E	Southern Ocean	South of the Indian Ocean
66°0′S 121°18′E	Antarctica	Wilkes Land, territory claimed by Australia
66°0′S 121°44′E	Southern Ocean	South of the Indian Ocean
66°0′S 129°29′E	Antarctica	Wilkes Land, territory claimed by Australia
66°0′S 130°5′E	Southern Ocean	South of the Indian Ocean
66°0′S 134°32′E	Antarctica	Wilkes Land, territory claimed by Australia
66°0′S 135°21′E	Southern Ocean	South of the Indian Ocean
62°0′S 147°0′E	Southern Ocean	South of the Pacific Ocean
66°0′S 65°21′W	Antarctica	Antarctic Peninsula, claimed by Argentina, Chile and United Kingdom
66°0′S 60°18′W	Southern Ocean	South of the Atlantic Ocean

=== 67th parallel south ===
67th parallel south (interactive map)

The 67th parallel south is a circle of latitude that is 67 degrees south of the Earth's equatorial plane, about 50 km south of the Antarctic Circle. It crosses the Southern Ocean and Antarctica.

At this latitude the sun is visible for 24 hours during the December solstice (Summer solstice) and 1 hour, 29 minutes during the June solstice (Winter solstice). If the latitude in the southern hemisphere is 67°45′ or smaller, every day of the month of September can view both astronomical dawn and astronomical dusk.

Starting at the Prime Meridian and heading eastwards, the parallel 67° south passes through:

Coordinates	Continent or ocean	Notes
67°0′S 0°0′E	Southern Ocean	King Haakon VII Sea, south of the Atlantic Ocean
67°0′S 48°22′E	Antarctica	Enderby Land, territory claimed by Australia
67°0′S 49°34′E	Southern Ocean	Amundsen Bay, King Haakon VII Sea, south of the South Atlantic
67°0′S 50°33′E	Antarctica	Enderby Land, claimed by Australia
67°0′S 57°23′E	Southern Ocean	South of the Indian Ocean
68°0′S 82°33′E	Antarctica	Kemp Land, Mac. Robertson Land, claimed by Australia
68°0′S 136°0′E	Antarctica	Adélie Land, claimed by France
68°0′S 142°0′E	Antarctica	George V Land, claimed by Australia
67°0′S 146°47′E	Southern Ocean	Passing just south of Buckle Island, claimed by New Zealand
67°0′S 68°36′W	Antarctica	Adelaide Island and the Antarctic Peninsula, claimed by Argentina, Chile and United Kingdom
67°0′S 60°17′W	Southern Ocean	Weddell Sea, south of the Atlantic Ocean

=== 68th parallel south ===
68th parallel south (interactive map)

The 68th parallel south is a circle of latitude that is 68 degrees south of the Earth's equatorial plane, in the Antarctic. It crosses the Southern Ocean and Antarctica. At this latitude, the sun is visible for 24 hours during the December Solstice, and civil twilight during the June Solstice.

Starting at the Prime Meridian and heading eastwards, the parallel 68° south passes through:

Coordinates	Continent or ocean	Notes
68°0′S 0°0′E	Southern Ocean	King Haakon VII Sea, south of the Atlantic Ocean
68°0′S 44°3′E	Antarctica	Queen Maud Land, claimed by Norway
68°0′S 45°0′E	Antarctica	Enderby Land, Kemp Land, Mac. Robertson Land, claimed by Australia
68°0′S 70°45′E	Southern Ocean	Prydz Bay, Cooperation Sea, south of the Indian Ocean
68°0′S 80°3′E	Antarctica	Princess Elizabeth Land, Wilhelm II Land, Queen Mary Land, Wilkes Land, claimed by Australia
68°0′S 136°0′E	Antarctica	Adélie Land, claimed by France
68°0′S 142°0′E	Antarctica	George V Land, claimed by Australia
68°0′S 148°31′E	Southern Ocean	South of the Pacific Ocean
68°0′S 67°13′W	Antarctica	Alexander Island and Antarctic Peninsula, claimed by Argentina, Chile and United Kingdom (overlapping claims)
68°0′S 60°6′W	Southern Ocean	Weddell Sea, south of the Atlantic Ocean

=== 69th parallel south ===
69th parallel south (interactive map)

The 69th parallel south is a circle of latitude that is 69 degrees south of the Earth's equatorial plane, in the Antarctic. It crosses the Southern Ocean and Antarctica.

Starting at the Prime Meridian and heading eastwards, the parallel 69° south passes through:

Coordinates	Continent or ocean	Notes
69°0′S 0°0′E	Southern Ocean	King Haakon VII Sea, south of the Atlantic Ocean
69°0′S 32°30′E	Antarctica	Queen Maud Land, claimed by Norway
69°0′S 35°4′E	Southern Ocean	Lützow-Holm Bay, King Haakon VII Sea, south of the Indian Ocean
69°0′S 39°46′E	Antarctica	Queen Maud Land, claimed by Norway
69°0′S 45°0′E	Antarctica	Enderby Land, Kemp Land, Mac. Robertson Land, claimed by Australia
69°0′S 74°55′E	Southern Ocean	Prydz Bay, Cooperation Sea, south of the Indian Ocean
69°0′S 78°10′E	Antarctica	Princess Elizabeth Land, Wilhelm II Land, Queen Mary Land, Wilkes Land, claimed by Australia
69°0′S 136°0′E	Antarctica	Adélie Land, claimed by France
69°0′S 142°0′E	Antarctica	George V Land, claimed by Australia
69°0′S 156°0′E	Southern Ocean	South of the Pacific Ocean; Passing south of Peter I Island
69°0′S 71°47′W	Antarctica	Alexander Island and Antarctic Peninsula - claimed by Argentina, Chile and United Kingdom (overlapping claims)
69°0′S 70°5′W	Southern Ocean	Marguerite Bay, Bellingshausen Sea, south of the Drake Passage
69°0′S 67°34′W	Antarctica	Antarctic Peninsula, claimed by Argentina, Chile and United Kingdom
69°0′S 60°33′W	Southern Ocean	Weddell Sea, south of the Atlantic Ocean
69°0′S 1°23′W	Antarctica	Queen Maud Land, claimed by Norway

=== 70th parallel south ===
70th parallel south (interactive map)

The 70th parallel south is a circle of latitude that is 70 degrees south of the Earth's equatorial plane in the Antarctic. The parallel passes through the Southern Ocean and Antarctica.

Starting at the Prime Meridian and heading eastwards, the parallel 70° south passes through:

Coordinates	Continent or ocean	Notes
70°0′S 0°0′E	Antarctica	Queen Maud Land, claimed by Norway
70°0′S 2°30′E	Southern Ocean	King Haakon VII Sea, south of the Atlantic Ocean
70°0′S 6°22′E	Antarctica	Queen Maud Land, claimed by Norway
70°0′S 7°25′E	Southern Ocean	King Haakon VII Sea, south of the Indian Ocean
70°0′S 7°59′E	Antarctica	Queen Maud Land, claimed by Norway
70°0′S 22°42′E	Southern Ocean	King Haakon VII Sea, south of the Indian Ocean
70°0′S 26°30′E	Antarctica	Queen Maud Land, claimed by Norway
71°0′S 45°0′E	Antarctica	Western Australian Antarctic Territory, claimed by Australia
70°0′S 136°0′E	Antarctica	Adélie Land, claimed by France
70°0′S 142°0′E	Antarctica	George V Land, claimed by Australia
70°0′S 160°0′E	Antarctica	Ross Dependency, claimed by New Zealand
70°0′S 160°34′E	Southern Ocean	South of the Pacific Ocean
70°0′S 74°39′W	Antarctica	Alexander Island and Antarctic Peninsula - claimed by Argentina, Chile and United Kingdom (overlapping claims)
70°0′S 60°33′W	Southern Ocean	Weddell Sea, south of the Atlantic Ocean
70°0′S 1°30′W	Antarctica	Queen Maud Land, claimed by Norway

== 70th parallel south to 75th parallel south ==
=== 71st parallel south ===
71st parallel south (interactive map)

The 71st parallel south is a circle of latitude that is 71 degrees south of the Earth's equatorial plane in the Antarctic. The parallel passes through the Southern Ocean and Antarctica.

Starting at the Prime Meridian and heading eastwards, the parallel 71° south passes through:

Coordinates	Continent or ocean	Notes
71°0′S 0°0′E	Antarctica	Queen Maud Land, claimed by Norway
71°0′S 45°0′E	Antarctica	Western Australian Antarctic Territory, claimed by Australia
71°0′S 136°0′E	Antarctica	Adélie Land, claimed by France
71°0′S 142°0′E	Antarctica	Eastern Australian Antarctic Territory, claimed by Australia
71°0′S 160°0′E	Antarctica	Ross Dependency, claimed by New Zealand
71°0′S 167°47′E	Southern Ocean	South of the Pacific Ocean
71°0′S 73°18′W	Antarctica	Alexander Island and Antarctic Peninsula - claimed by Argentina, Chile and United Kingdom (overlapping claims)
71°0′S 60°24′W	Southern Ocean	Weddell Sea, south of the Atlantic Ocean
71°0′S 10°59′W	Antarctica	Queen Maud Land, claimed by Norway

=== 72nd parallel south ===
72nd parallel south (interactive map)

The 72nd parallel south is a circle of latitude that is 72 degrees south of the Earth's equatorial plane in the Antarctic. The parallel passes through the Southern Ocean and Antarctica.

This is the parallel where twilight/nighttime boundary on the equinoxes.

This is also the lowest parallel that golden hour occurs even at midnight sun, because the Sun is less than 6°00'00" above the horizon. Midnight sun without golden hour occurs at latitudes greater than 72°33'38.58804", i.e., about 666.8 km (414.3 mi) south of the Antarctic Circle in the case of the December Solstice.

Starting at the Prime Meridian and heading eastwards, the parallel 72° south passes through:

Coordinates	Continent or ocean	Notes
72°0′S 0°0′E	Antarctica	Queen Maud Land, claimed by Norway
72°0′S 45°0′E	Antarctica	Western Australian Antarctic Territory, claimed by Australia
72°0′S 136°0′E	Antarctica	Adélie Land, claimed by France
72°0′S 142°0′E	Antarctica	Eastern Australian Antarctic Territory, claimed by Australia
72°0′S 160°0′E	Antarctica	Ross Dependency, claimed by New Zealand
72°0′S 170°38′E	Southern Ocean	Ross Sea, south of the Pacific Ocean
72°0′S 102°15′W	Antarctica	Thurston Island, off coast Ellsworth Land, unclaimed territory
72°0′S 95°36′W	Southern Ocean	Bellingshausen Sea, south of the Pacific Ocean
72°0′S 74°21′W	Antarctica	Alexander Island and Antarctic Peninsula - claimed by Argentina, Chile and United Kingdom (overlapping claims)
72°0′S 60°5′W	Southern Ocean	Weddell Sea, south of the Atlantic Ocean
72°0′S 14°33′W	Antarctica	Queen Maud Land, claimed by Norway

=== 73rd parallel south ===
73rd parallel south (interactive map)

The 73rd parallel south is a circle of latitude that is 73 degrees south of the Earth's equatorial plane in the Antarctic. The parallel passes through the Southern Ocean and Antarctica.

Starting at the Prime Meridian and heading eastwards, the parallel 73° south passes through:

Coordinates	Continent or ocean	Notes
73°0′S 0°0′E	Antarctica	Queen Maud Land, claimed by Norway
73°0′S 45°0′E	Antarctica	Western Australian Antarctic Territory, claimed by Australia
73°0′S 136°0′E	Antarctica	Adélie Land, claimed by France
73°0′S 142°0′E	Antarctica	Eastern Australian Antarctic Territory, claimed by Australia
73°0′S 160°0′E	Antarctica	Ross Dependency, claimed by New Zealand
73°0′S 169°37′E	Southern Ocean	Ross Sea, south of the Pacific Ocean
73°0′S 103°26′W	Antarctica	Marie Byrd Land, Unclaimed territory
73°0′S 90°0′W	Antarctica	Antártica Chilena, claimed by Chile
73°0′S 85°46′W	Southern Ocean	Bellingshausen Sea, south of the Pacific Ocean
73°0′S 79°3′W	Antarctica	Territory claimed by Chile and United Kingdom (overlapping claims)
73°0′S 74°17′W	Southern Ocean	Bellingshausen Sea, south of the Pacific Ocean
73°0′S 73°7′W	Antarctica	Territory claimed by Argentina, Chile and United Kingdom (overlapping claims)
73°0′S 59°48′W	Southern Ocean	Weddell Sea, south of the Atlantic Ocean
73°0′S 19°21′W	Antarctica	Queen Maud Land, claimed by Norway

=== 74th parallel south ===
74th parallel south (interactive map)

The 74th parallel south is a circle of latitude that is 74 degrees south of the Earth's equatorial plane in the Antarctic. The parallel passes through the Southern Ocean and Antarctica.

Starting at the Prime Meridian and heading eastwards, the parallel 74° south passes through:

Coordinates	Continent or ocean	Notes
74°0′S 0°0′E	Antarctica	Queen Maud Land, claimed by Norway
74°0′S 45°0′E	Antarctica	Western Australian Antarctic Territory, claimed by Australia
74°0′S 136°0′E	Antarctica	Adélie Land, claimed by France
74°0′S 142°0′E	Antarctica	Eastern Australian Antarctic Territory, claimed by Australia
74°0′S 160°0′E	Antarctica	Ross Dependency, claimed by New Zealand
74°0′S 166°2′E	Southern Ocean	Ross Sea, south of the Pacific Ocean
74°0′S 127°24′W	Antarctica	Marie Byrd Land, Unclaimed territory
74°0′S 113°34′E	Southern Ocean	Amundsen Sea, south of the Pacific Ocean
74°0′S 109°20′W	Antarctica	Marie Byrd Land, Unclaimed territory
74°0′S 107°49′E	Southern Ocean	Amundsen Sea, south of the Pacific Ocean
74°0′S 102°19′W	Antarctica	Marie Byrd Land, Unclaimed territory
74°0′S 90°0′W	Antarctica	Antártica Chilena, claimed by Chile
74°0′S 80°0′W	Antarctica	Territory claimed by Chile and United Kingdom (overlapping claims)
74°0′S 74°0′W	Antarctica	Territory claimed by Argentina, Chile and United Kingdom (overlapping claims)
74°0′S 53°0′W	Antarctica	Territory claimed by Argentina and United Kingdom (overlapping claims)
74°0′S 60°50′W	Southern Ocean	Weddell Sea, south of the Atlantic Ocean
74°0′S 21°13′W	Antarctica	British Antarctic Territory, claimed by United Kingdom
74°0′S 20°0′W	Antarctica	Queen Maud Land, claimed by Norway

=== 75th parallel south ===
75th parallel south (interactive map)

The 75th parallel south is a circle of latitude that is 75 degrees south of the Earth's equatorial plane in the Antarctic. It passes through the Southern Ocean and Antarctica.

Starting at the Prime Meridian and heading eastwards, the parallel 75° south passes through:

Coordinates	Continent or ocean	Notes
75°0′S 0°0′E	Antarctica	Queen Maud Land, claimed by Norway
75°0′S 45°0′E	Antarctica	Western Australian Antarctic Territory, claimed by Australia
75°0′S 136°0′E	Antarctica	Adélie Land, claimed by France
75°0′S 142°0′E	Antarctica	Eastern Australian Antarctic Territory, claimed by Australia
75°0′S 160°0′E	Antarctica	Ross Dependency, claimed by New Zealand
75°0′S 163°39′E	Southern Ocean	Ross Sea, south of the Pacific Ocean
75°0′S 137°0′W	Antarctica	Ross Dependency, claimed by New Zealand
75°0′S 150°0′W	Antarctica	Marie Byrd Land, Unclaimed territory
75°0′S 90°0′W	Antarctica	Antártica Chilena, claimed by Chile
75°0′S 80°0′W	Antarctica	Territory claimed by Chile and United Kingdom (overlapping claims)
75°0′S 74°0′W	Antarctica	Territory claimed by Argentina, Chile and United Kingdom (overlapping claims)
75°0′S 53°0′W	Antarctica	Territory claimed by Argentina and United Kingdom (overlapping claims)
75°0′S 61°32′W	Southern Ocean	Weddell Sea, south of the Atlantic Ocean
75°0′S 24°12′W	Antarctica	British Antarctic Territory, claimed by United Kingdom
75°0′S 20°0′W	Antarctica	Queen Maud Land, claimed by Norway

== 75th parallel south to 80th parallel south ==
=== 76th parallel south ===
76th parallel south (interactive map)

The 76th parallel south is a circle of latitude that is 76 degrees south of the Earth's equatorial plane in the Antarctic. The parallel passes through the Southern Ocean and Antarctica.

Starting at the Prime Meridian and heading eastwards, the parallel 76° south passes through:

Coordinates	Continent or ocean	Notes
76°0′S 0°0′E	Antarctica	Queen Maud Land, claimed by Norway
76°0′S 45°0′E	Antarctica	Western Australian Antarctic Territory, claimed by Australia
76°0′S 136°0′E	Antarctica	Adélie Land, claimed by France
76°0′S 142°0′E	Antarctica	Eastern Australian Antarctic Territory, claimed by Australia
76°0′S 160°0′E	Antarctica	Ross Dependency, claimed by New Zealand
76°0′S 162°35′E	Southern Ocean	Ross Sea, south of the Pacific Ocean
76°0′S 148°5′W	Antarctica	Ross Dependency, claimed by New Zealand
76°0′S 150°0′W	Antarctica	Marie Byrd Land, Unclaimed territory
76°0′S 90°0′W	Antarctica	Antártica Chilena, claimed by Chile
76°0′S 80°0′W	Antarctica	Territory claimed by Chile and United Kingdom (overlapping claims)
76°0′S 74°0′W	Antarctica	Territory claimed by Argentina, Chile and United Kingdom (overlapping claims)
76°0′S 53°0′W	Antarctica	Territory claimed by Argentina and United Kingdom (overlapping claims)
76°0′S 56°54′W	Southern Ocean	Weddell Sea, south of the Atlantic Ocean
76°0′S 27°0′W	Antarctica	Territory claimed by Argentina and United Kingdom (overlapping claims)
76°0′S 25°0′W	Antarctica	British Antarctic Territory, claimed by United Kingdom
76°0′S 20°0′W	Antarctica	Queen Maud Land, claimed by Norway

=== 77th parallel south ===
77th parallel south (interactive map)

The 77th parallel south is a circle of latitude that is 77 degrees south of the Earth's equatorial plane in the Antarctic. The parallel passes through the Southern Ocean and Antarctica.

Starting at the Prime Meridian and heading eastwards, the parallel 77° south passes through:

Coordinates	Continent or ocean	Notes
77°0′S 0°0′E	Antarctica	Queen Maud Land, claimed by Norway
77°0′S 45°0′E	Antarctica	Western Australian Antarctic Territory, claimed by Australia
77°0′S 136°0′E	Antarctica	Adélie Land, claimed by France
77°0′S 142°0′E	Antarctica	Eastern Australian Antarctic Territory, claimed by Australia
77°0′S 160°0′E	Antarctica	Ross Dependency, claimed by New Zealand
77°0′S 151°22′E	Southern Ocean	Ross Sea, south of the Pacific Ocean
77°0′S 148°5′W	Antarctica	Ross Dependency, claimed by New Zealand
77°0′S 150°0′W	Antarctica	Marie Byrd Land, Unclaimed territory
77°0′S 90°0′W	Antarctica	Antártica Chilena, claimed by Chile
77°0′S 80°0′W	Antarctica	Territory claimed by Chile and United Kingdom (overlapping claims)
77°0′S 74°0′W	Antarctica	Territory claimed by Argentina, Chile and United Kingdom (overlapping claims)
77°0′S 53°0′W	Antarctica	Territory claimed by Argentina and United Kingdom (overlapping claims)
77°0′S 51°6′W	Southern Ocean	Weddell Sea, south of the Atlantic Ocean
77°0′S 31°27′W	Antarctica	Territory claimed by Argentina and United Kingdom (overlapping claims)
77°0′S 25°0′W	Antarctica	British Antarctic Territory, claimed by United Kingdom
77°0′S 20°0′W	Antarctica	Queen Maud Land, claimed by Norway

=== 78th parallel south ===
78th parallel south (interactive map)

The 78th parallel south is a circle of latitude that is 78 degrees south of the Earth's equatorial plane in the Antarctic. The parallel passes through the Southern Ocean and Antarctica.

Starting at the Prime Meridian and heading eastwards, the parallel 78° south passes through:

Coordinates	Continent or ocean	Notes
78°0′S 0°0′E	Antarctica	Queen Maud Land, claimed by Norway
78°0′S 45°0′E	Antarctica	Western Australian Antarctic Territory, claimed by Australia
78°0′S 136°0′E	Antarctica	Adélie Land, claimed by France
78°0′S 142°0′E	Antarctica	Eastern Australian Antarctic Territory, claimed by Australia
78°0′S 160°0′E	Antarctica	Ross Dependency, claimed by New Zealand
78°0′S 177°42′E	Southern Ocean	Ross Sea, south of the Pacific Ocean
78°0′S 160°26′W	Antarctica	Ross Dependency, claimed by New Zealand
78°0′S 150°0′W	Antarctica	Marie Byrd Land, Unclaimed territory
78°0′S 90°0′W	Antarctica	Antártica Chilena, claimed by Chile
78°0′S 80°0′W	Antarctica	Territory claimed by Chile and United Kingdom (overlapping claims)
78°0′S 74°0′W	Antarctica	Territory claimed by Argentina, Chile and United Kingdom (overlapping claims)
78°0′S 53°0′W	Antarctica	Territory claimed by Argentina and United Kingdom (overlapping claims)
78°0′S 45°44′W	Southern Ocean	Weddell Sea, south of the Atlantic Ocean
78°0′S 42°7′W	Antarctica	Territory claimed by Argentina and United Kingdom (overlapping claims)
78°0′S 25°0′W	Antarctica	British Antarctic Territory, claimed by United Kingdom
78°0′S 20°0′W	Antarctica	Queen Maud Land, claimed by Norway

=== 79th parallel south ===
79th parallel south (interactive map)

The 79th parallel south is a circle of latitude that is 79 degrees south of the Earth's equatorial plane in the Antarctic.

The parallel passes only through Antarctica and Antarctic ice shelves.

Starting at the Prime Meridian and heading eastwards, the parallel 79° south passes through:

Coordinates	Continent	Notes
79°0′S 0°0′E	Antarctica	Queen Maud Land, claimed by Norway
79°0′S 45°0′E	Antarctica	Western Australian Antarctic Territory, claimed by Australia
79°0′S 136°0′E	Antarctica	Adélie Land, claimed by France
79°0′S 142°0′E	Antarctica	Eastern Australian Antarctic Territory, claimed by Australia
79°0′S 160°0′E	Antarctica	Ross Dependency, claimed by New Zealand
79°0′S 150°0′W	Antarctica	Marie Byrd Land, Unclaimed territory
79°0′S 90°0′W	Antarctica	Antártica Chilena, claimed by Chile
79°0′S 80°0′W	Antarctica	Territory claimed by Chile and United Kingdom (overlapping claims)
79°0′S 74°0′W	Antarctica	Territory claimed by Argentina, Chile and United Kingdom (overlapping claims)
79°0′S 53°0′W	Antarctica	Territory claimed by Argentina and United Kingdom (overlapping claims)
79°0′S 25°0′W	Antarctica	British Antarctic Territory, claimed by United Kingdom
79°0′S 20°0′W	Antarctica	Queen Maud Land, claimed by Norway

=== 80th parallel south ===
80th parallel south (interactive map)

The 80th parallel south is a circle of latitude that is 80 degrees south of the Earth's equatorial plane, and 10 degrees (690 miles/1100 kilometers) north of the United States Amundsen–Scott South Pole Station. Regions south of this latitude are excluded from UTM zones.

This line of latitude passes only through Antarctica and Antarctic ice shelves.

Starting at the Prime Meridian and heading eastwards, the parallel 80° south passes through:

Coordinates	Continent	Sub-continent	Local area	Claimed by
80°0′S 0°0′E	Antarctica	East Antarctica	Part of Queen Maud Land	Norway
80°0′S 45°0′E	Antarctica	East Antarctica	Enderby Land, Kemp Land, Mac. Robertson Land, Princess Elizabeth Land, Kaiser Wilhelm II Land, Queen Mary Land, Wilkes Land, aka Western Australian Antarctic Territory	Australia
80°0′S 136°0′E	Antarctica	East Antarctica	Adélie Land	France
80°0′S 142°0′E	Antarctica	East Antarctica	George V Land, Oates Land, Victoria Land, aka Eastern Australian Antarctic Territory	Australia
80°0′S 160°0′E	Antarctica	East Antarctica	Ross Dependency	New Zealand
80°0′S 150°0′W	Antarctica	West Antarctica	Marie Byrd Land; Ellsworth Land	Unclaimed territory
80°0′S 90°0′W	Antarctica	West Antarctica	Ellsworth Land, in parts Antártica Chilena	Chile
80°0′S 80°0′W	Antarctica	West Antarctica	Ellsworth Land	Chile and United Kingdom (overlapping claims)
80°0′S 74°0′W	Antarctica	West Antarctica	Antarctic Peninsula	Argentina, Chile and United Kingdom (overlapping claims)
80°0′S 53°0′W	Antarctica	West Antarctica	Filchner-Ronne Ice Shelf	Argentina and United Kingdom (overlapping claims)
80°0′S 25°0′W	Antarctica	West Antarctica	Coats Land, part of British Antarctic Territory	United Kingdom
80°0′S 20°0′W	Antarctica	West Antarctica	Part of Queen Maud Land	Norway

== 80th parallel south to 85th parallel south ==
=== 81st parallel south ===
81st parallel south (interactive map)

=== 82nd parallel south ===
82nd parallel south (interactive map)

=== 83rd parallel south ===
83rd parallel south (interactive map)

=== 84th parallel south ===
84th parallel south (interactive map)

=== 85th parallel south ===
85th parallel south (interactive map)

== 85th parallel south to South Pole ==
=== 86th parallel south ===
86th parallel south (interactive map)

=== 87th parallel south ===
87th parallel south (interactive map)

=== 88th parallel south ===
88th parallel south (interactive map)

=== 89th parallel south ===
89th parallel south (interactive map)

== See also ==
- Antarctica
- Circles of latitude between the 50th parallel south and the 60th parallel south
- South Pole
