= Tropical monsoon climate =

Climate subtype in the Köppen climate classification system

Worldwide zones of tropical monsoon climate (Am).

An area of tropical monsoon climate (occasionally known as a sub-equatorial, tropical wet climate or a tropical monsoon and trade-wind littoral climate) is a tropical climate subtype that corresponds to the Köppen climate classification category Am. Tropical monsoon climates have monthly mean temperatures above 18 °C (64 °F) in every month of the year and a dry season. The tropical monsoon climate is the intermediate climate between the wet Af (or tropical rainforest climate) and the drier Aw (or tropical savanna climate).

A tropical monsoon climate's driest month has on average less than 60 mm, but more than $100-\left(\frac{Total\ Annual\ Precipitation\ (mm)}{25}\right)$. This is in direct contrast to a tropical savanna climate, whose driest month has less than 60 mm of precipitation and also less than $100-\left(\frac{Total\ Annual\ Precipitation\ (mm)}{25}\right)$ of average monthly precipitation. In essence, a tropical monsoon climate tends to either have more rainfall than a tropical savanna climate or have less pronounced dry seasons. A tropical monsoon climate tends to vary less in temperature during a year than does a tropical savanna climate.

The driest month nearly always occurs at or soon after the winter solstice, that is the December solstice in the Northern Hemisphere, and the June solstice in the Southern Hemisphere.

== Varieties ==
There are generally two varieties of a tropical monsoon climate:

- Less pronounced dry seasons. Regions with this variation of the tropical monsoon climate typically see copious amounts of rain during the wet season(s), usually in the form of frequent thunderstorms. Unlike most tropical savanna climates, a sizeable amount of precipitation also falls during the dry season(s), but not quite enough for a tropical rainforest classification. In essence, this version of the tropical monsoon climate generally has less pronounced dry seasons than tropical savanna climates.
- Extraordinarily rainy wet seasons and pronounced dry seasons. This variation features pronounced dry seasons similar in length and character to dry seasons observed in tropical savanna climates. This is followed by a sustained period (or sustained periods) of extraordinary rainfall. In some instances, up to (and sometimes in excess of) 1,000 mm of precipitation is observed per month for two or more consecutive months. Tropical savanna climates generally do not see this level of sustained rainfall.

== Area ==
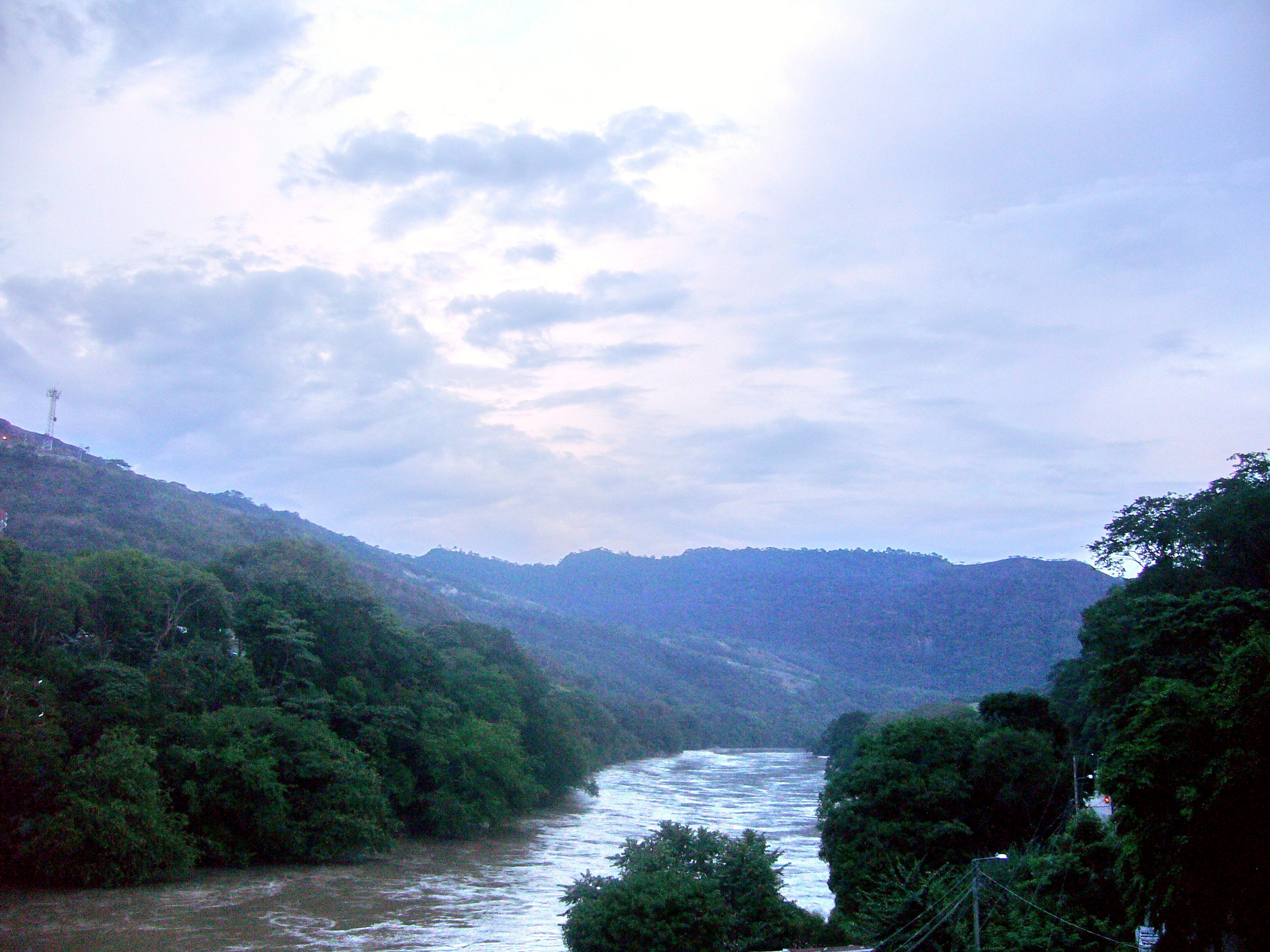
Magdalena River at Honda, Colombia.

Tropical monsoon are most commonly found in Africa (West and Central Africa), Asia (South and Southeast Asia), northern South America, and Central America. This climate also occurs in sections of the Caribbean, North America (South Florida), and northern Australia.

== Factors ==
The major controlling factor over a tropical monsoon climate is its relationship to the monsoon circulation. The monsoon is a seasonal change in wind direction. In Asia, during the summer (or high-sun season) there is an onshore flow of air (air moving from ocean toward land). In the “winter” (or low-sun season) an offshore air flow (air moving from land toward water) is prevalent. The change in direction is due to the difference in the way water and land heat.

Changing pressure patterns that affect the seasonality of precipitation also occur in Africa, though it generally differs from the way it operates in Asia. During the high-sun season, the Intertropical convergence zone (ITCZ) induces rain. During the low-sun season, the subtropical high creates dry conditions. The monsoon climates of Africa, and the Americas for that matter, are typically located along trade wind coasts.

== Select charts ==
Manila, Philippines

Climate chart (precipitation, max. and min. temperature)
J	F	M	A	M	J	J	A	S	O	N	D
19 30 24	22 31 26	22 32 25	23 34 27	159 34 27	253 33 27	432 32 26	476 31 26	396 31 26	221 31 26	120 31 25	99 30 25
- █ Average max. and min. temperatures in °C
- █ Precipitation totals in mm
- Source: PAGASA
Imperial conversion
J	F	M	A	M	J	J	A	S	O	N	D
0.8 86 75	0.9 87 79	0.9 90 78	0.9 93 80	6.3 92 81	10 91 80	17 89 79	19 88 79	16 88 78	8.7 89 78	4.7 88 78	3.9 87 76
- █ Average max. and min. temperatures in °F
- █ Precipitation totals in inches

Kaohsiung, Taiwan

Climate chart (precipitation, max. and min. temperature)
J	F	M	A	M	J	J	A	S	O	N	D
19 24 16	18 25 17	32 27 20	68 29 23	202 31 25	416 32 26	377 33 27	512 32 26	225 32 26	53 30 24	26 28 22	19 25 18
- █ Average max. and min. temperatures in °C
- █ Precipitation totals in mm
- Source: Climate Data
Imperial conversion
J	F	M	A	M	J	J	A	S	O	N	D
0.8 76 61	0.7 77 63	1.3 81 67	2.7 85 73	8 88 77	16 90 79	15 91 80	20 90 79	8.8 89 79	2.1 86 76	1 83 71	0.8 78 64
- █ Average max. and min. temperatures in °F
- █ Precipitation totals in inches

Chittagong, Bangladesh

Climate chart (precipitation, max. and min. temperature)
J	F	M	A	M	J	J	A	S	O	N	D
9 26 14	21 29 17	49 31 21	103 32 24	333 33 25	627 32 26	718 31 26	533 31 26	282 32 26	231 32 24	47 30 21	11 27 16
- █ Average max. and min. temperatures in °C
- █ Precipitation totals in mm
- Source: BBC
Imperial conversion
J	F	M	A	M	J	J	A	S	O	N	D
0.4 79 58	0.8 83 62	1.9 88 70	4.1 90 75	13 91 77	25 89 78	28 89 78	21 88 78	11 89 78	9.1 89 76	1.9 86 69	0.4 81 61
- █ Average max. and min. temperatures in °F
- █ Precipitation totals in inches

Conakry, Guinea

Climate chart (precipitation, max. and min. temperature)
J	F	M	A	M	J	J	A	S	O	N	D
2.5 32 22	1.4 32 23	3.4 32 24	18 32 25	113 32 25	434 30 24	1083 29 23	1142 28 23	555 30 23	293 30 23	80 31 24	5.5 32 23
- █ Average max. and min. temperatures in °C
- █ Precipitation totals in mm
Imperial conversion
J	F	M	A	M	J	J	A	S	O	N	D
0.1 89 72	0.1 89 74	0.1 90 75	0.7 90 76	4.4 89 76	17 87 74	43 84 74	45 83 74	22 85 74	12 87 74	3.1 89 75	0.2 89 74
- █ Average max. and min. temperatures in °F
- █ Precipitation totals in inches

Jakarta, Indonesia

Climate chart (precipitation, max. and min. temperature)
J	F	M	A	M	J	J	A	S	O	N	D
373 31 25	381 31 25	210 32 26	164 33 26	103 33 26	80 33 26	78 33 25	52 33 25	61 33 26	112 33 26	135 33 26	183 32 26
- █ Average max. and min. temperatures in °C
- █ Precipitation totals in mm
- Source: World Meteorological Organization / National Oceanic and Atmospheric Administration (1991–2020 climatological normals)
Imperial conversion
J	F	M	A	M	J	J	A	S	O	N	D
15 88 77	15 87 77	8.3 90 78	6.5 91 78	4.1 92 78	3.2 91 78	3.1 91 78	2 91 78	2.4 92 78	4.4 92 78	5.3 91 78	7.2 90 78
- █ Average max. and min. temperatures in °F
- █ Precipitation totals in inches

Miami, Florida, US

Climate chart (precipitation, max. and min. temperature)
J	F	M	A	M	J	J	A	S	O	N	D
46 25 16	55 26 17	62 27 19	85 29 21	161 30 23	267 32 25	187 33 25	243 33 25	260 32 25	194 30 23	90 27 20	62 26 18
- █ Average max. and min. temperatures in °C
- █ Precipitation totals in mm
- Source: WMO
Imperial conversion
J	F	M	A	M	J	J	A	S	O	N	D
1.8 76 61	2.2 78 63	2.4 81 66	3.3 84 70	6.3 87 73	11 89 76	7.4 91 78	9.6 91 78	10 89 77	7.6 86 74	3.5 81 68	2.4 78 64
- █ Average max. and min. temperatures in °F
- █ Precipitation totals in inches

== See also ==
- Tropical climate
- Tropical rainforest climate
- Tropical savanna climate
- Köppen climate classification
