= Winter solstice =

Astronomical phenomenon

Winter Solstice
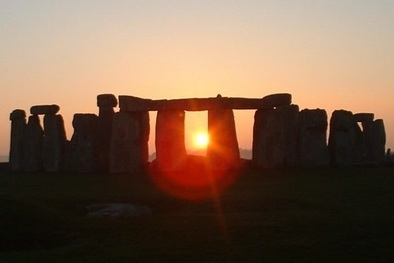
- Sunset at Stonehenge in England during the winter solstice in the Northern Hemisphere
- Also called: Midwinter; the Shortest Day; the Longest Night
- Observed by: Various cultures
- Type: Cultural, astronomical
- Significance: Beginning of lengthening days and shortening nights
- Celebrations: Feasting
- Date: 21 or 22 December (Northern Hemisphere) and 20 or 21 June (Southern Hemisphere)
- Related to: Winter festivals

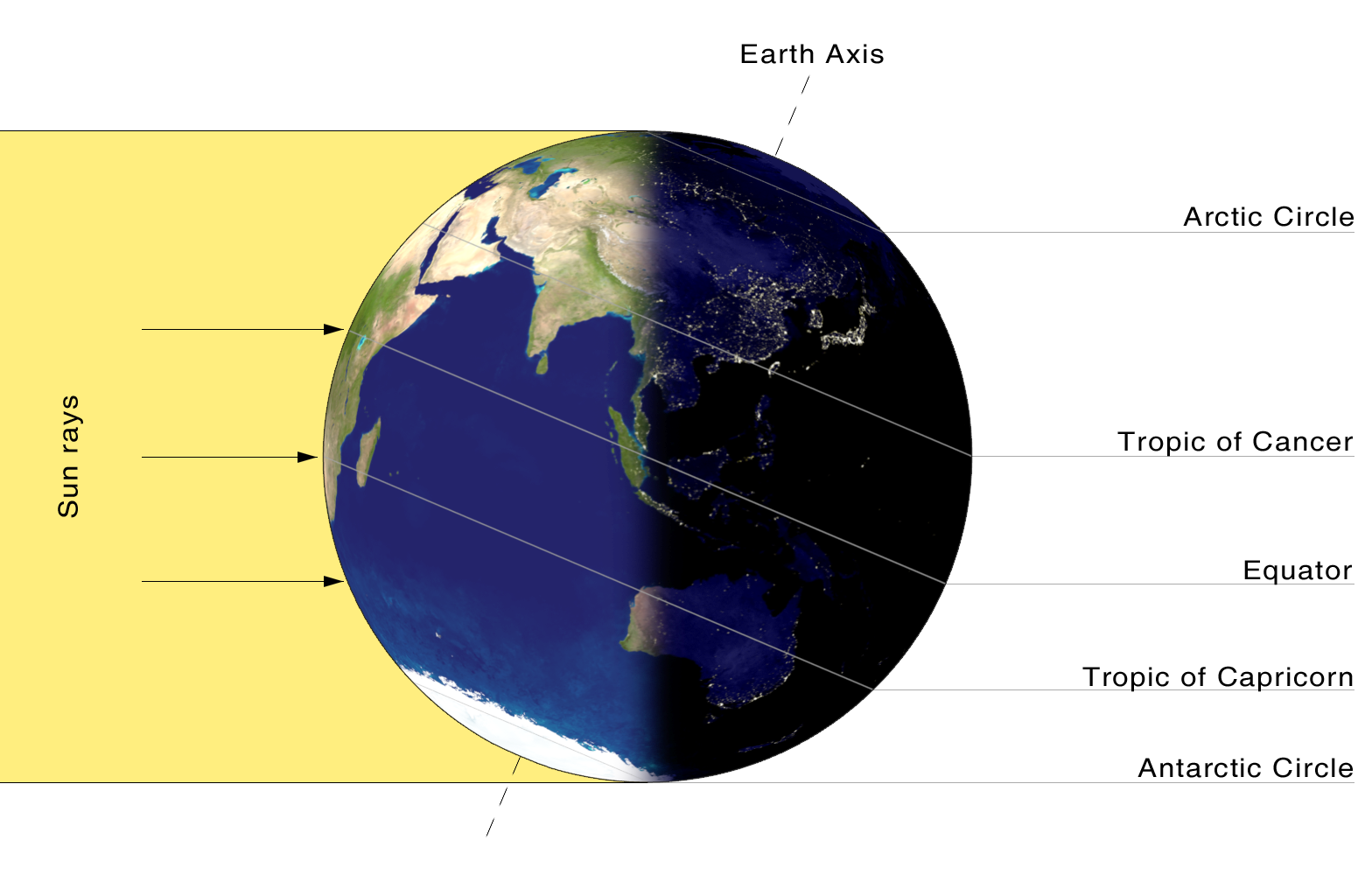
A view of Earth on the Northern hemisphere's winter solstice, with the North pole tilted furthest away from the Sun

The winter solstice, or hibernal solstice, occurs when either of Earth's poles reaches its maximum tilt away from the Sun. This happens twice yearly, once in each hemisphere (Northern and Southern). For that hemisphere, the winter solstice is the day with the shortest period of daylight and longest night of the year, and when the Sun is at its lowest arc in the sky. In each polar region, there is continuous darkness or twilight around its winter solstice. The opposite event is the summer solstice, which happens at the same time in the opposite hemisphere.

The winter solstice occurs during the hemisphere's winter. In the Northern Hemisphere, this is the December solstice (December 21 or 22) and in the Southern Hemisphere, this is the June solstice (June 20 or 21). Although the winter solstice itself occurs at a specific moment in time, the term is also commonly used to refer to the day on which it occurs. Traditionally, in many temperate regions, the winter solstice is seen as the middle of winter, and "midwinter" is another name for the winter solstice, although it carries other meanings as well. Other names are the "extreme of winter", the "shortest day" and the "longest night".

Since prehistory, the winter solstice has been a significant time of year in many cultures and has been marked by festivals and rites. "This is because it marks the point when daylight hours stop decreasing and begin to increase again." In parts of Europe it was seen as the symbolic death and rebirth of the Sun. Some ancient monuments such as Newgrange, Stonehenge, and Cahokia Woodhenge are aligned with the sunrise or sunset on the winter solstice.

== History and cultural significance ==
The winter solstice is the reversal of the Sun's apparent ebbing in the sky; the daytime stops becoming shorter and begins to lengthen again. In parts of ancient Europe, this was symbolized as the death and rebirth of the Sun, or of a Sun god.

There is evidence that the winter solstice was deemed an important time of the yearly cycle for some cultures as far back as the Neolithic (New Stone Age). Astronomical events were often used to guide farming activities, such as the sowing of crops and mating of animals. Livestock were slaughtered so they would not have to be fed during the winter, so it was almost the only time of year when there was a plentiful supply of fresh meat for feasting.

=== Neolithic Europe ===
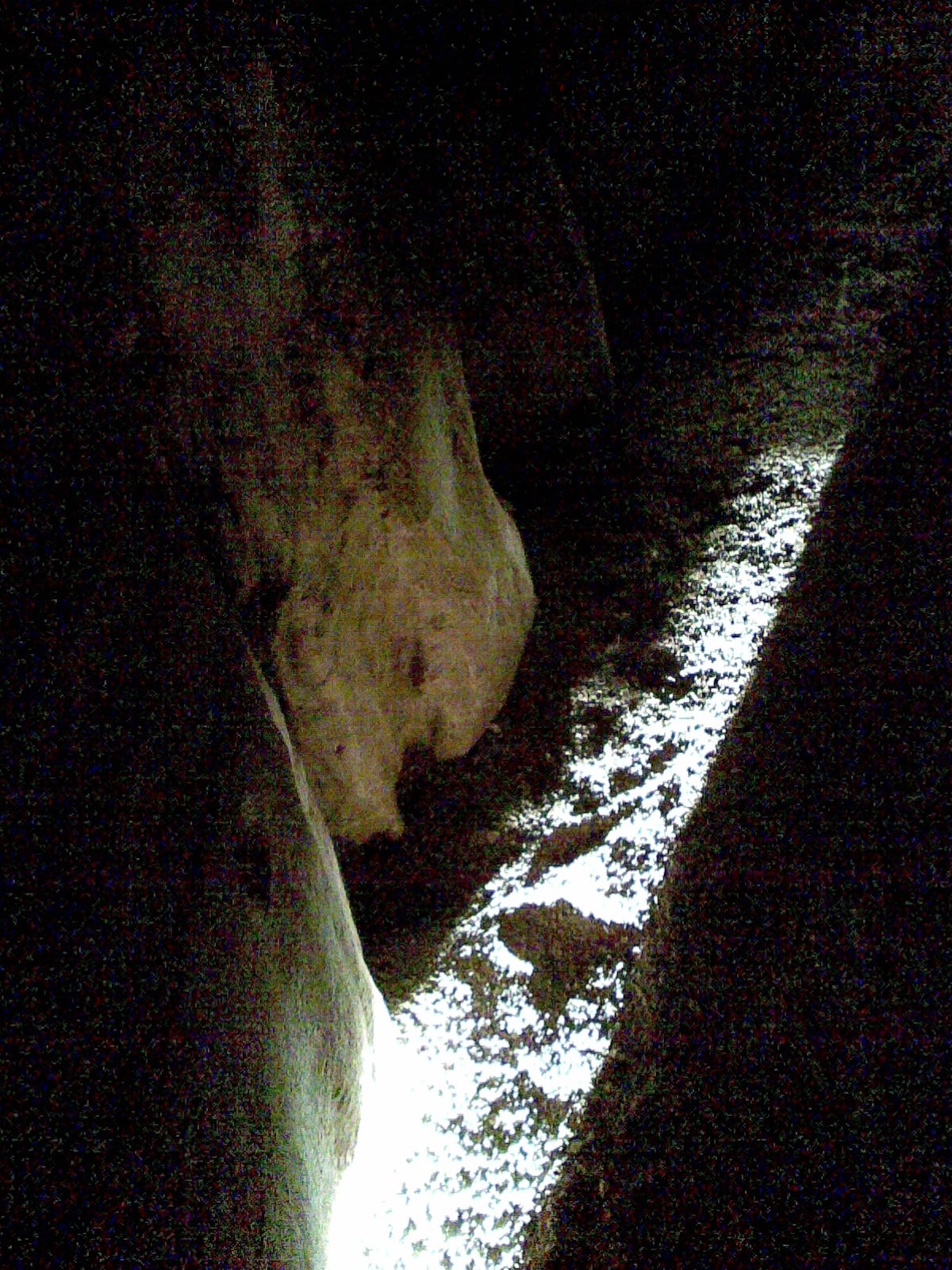
Sunlight entering the passage of Newgrange in Ireland on the winter solstice

Some important Neolithic and early Bronze Age archaeological sites in Europe are associated with the winter solstice, such as Stonehenge in England and Newgrange in Ireland (for others see List of archaeoastronomical sites by country). The primary axes of these two monuments seem to have been carefully aligned on a sight-line pointing to the winter solstice sunrise (Newgrange) and the solstice sunset (Stonehenge). Newgrange was built with a "light box" so that direct sunlight reaches the inner chamber only on the winter solstice. At Stonehenge, the great trilithon, the Heel Stone and the avenue are aligned to the winter solstice sunset. The Neolithic Goseck Circle in Germany has two openings, aligned with the winter solstice sunrise and sunset respectively.

=== Ancient Egypt ===
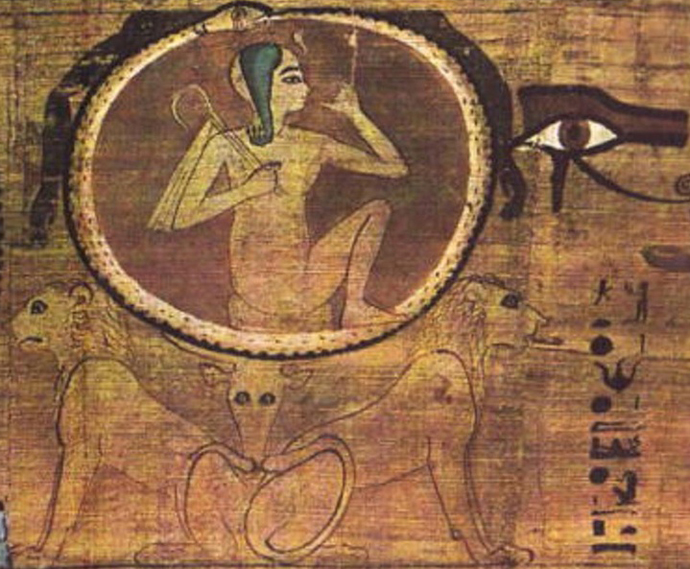
A 10th century BC papyrus showing Harpocrates (Horus the Child) inside a sun disk

Several ancient Egyptian temples are aligned with the winter solstice sunrise, including the Temple of Amun-Ra at Karnak, the chapel of Ra-Horakhty at Abu Simbel, and the Mortuary temple of Hatshepsut at Luxor.

Plutarch wrote in the Moralia (first century AD) that the Egyptians believed the goddess Isis gave birth to Harpocrates (Horus the Child) at the winter solstice. Macrobius wrote in the fourth century that the Sun appears small at the winter solstice, and on this shortest day, the Egyptians brought an idol of a child Sun god out of a shrine. In his Panarion, also from the fourth century, Epiphanius of Salamis wrote that the winter solstice was celebrated on 25 December in Alexandria as the Kikellia. Epiphanius says that thirteen days after the solstice, on 5–6 January, they celebrated the birth of Aion, son of the virgin goddess Kore. At the temple of Kore (the Koreion) in Alexandria, an all-night vigil was held, and at dawn an idol of the child god was brought out of an underground shrine. This idol was carried around the temple seven times, accompanied by music, hymns and revelry.

=== Ancient Roman world ===
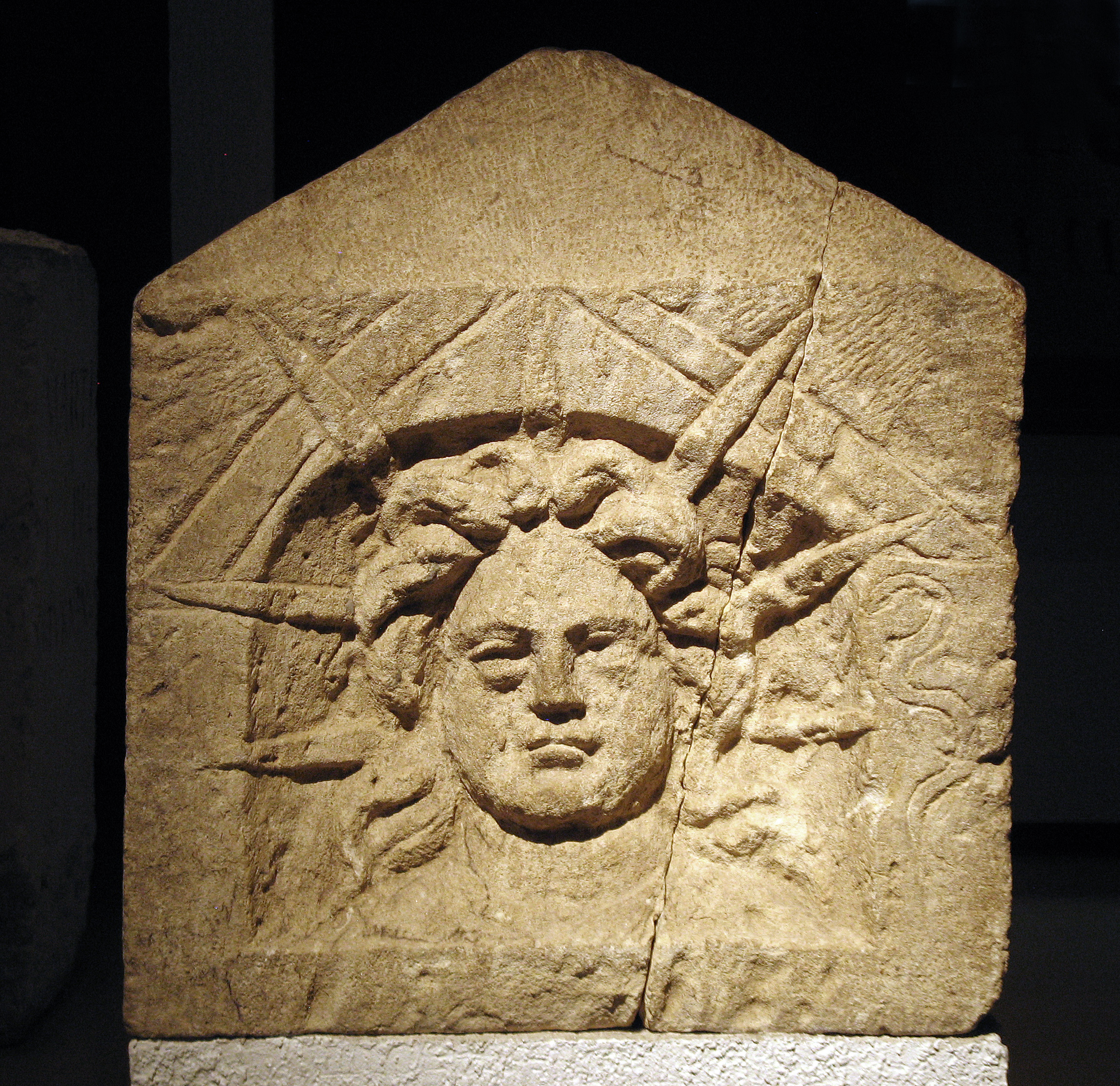
A 2nd–3rd century AD relief of Sol, whose birthday was the winter solstice

In the ancient Roman calendar, December 25 was the date of the winter solstice. Marcus Terentius Varro wrote in the first century BC that this was regarded as the middle of winter. In the same century, Ovid wrote in the Fasti that the winter solstice is the first day of the "new Sun". The Calendar of Antiochus of Athens, c. second century AD, marks it as the "birthday of the Sun". In AD 274, the emperor Aurelian made this the date of the festival Dies Natalis Solis Invicti, the birthday of Sol Invictus or the 'Invincible Sun'. Gary Forsythe, Professor of Ancient History, says "This celebration would have formed a welcome addition to the seven-day period of the Saturnalia (December 17–23), Rome's most joyous holiday season since Republican times, characterized by parties, banquets, and exchanges of gifts".

Liturgical historians generally accept that the winter solstice had some influence on the choice of December 25 as the date of Christmas. A widely-held theory is that the Church chose it as Christ's birthday (Dies Natalis Christi) specifically to appropriate the Roman festival of the sun god's birthday (Dies Natalis Solis Invicti). According to C. Philipp E. Nothaft, a professor at Trinity College Dublin, though this "is nowadays used as the default explanation for the choice of 25 December as Christ's birthday, few advocates of this theory seem to be aware of how paltry the available evidence actually is".

=== Germanic ===
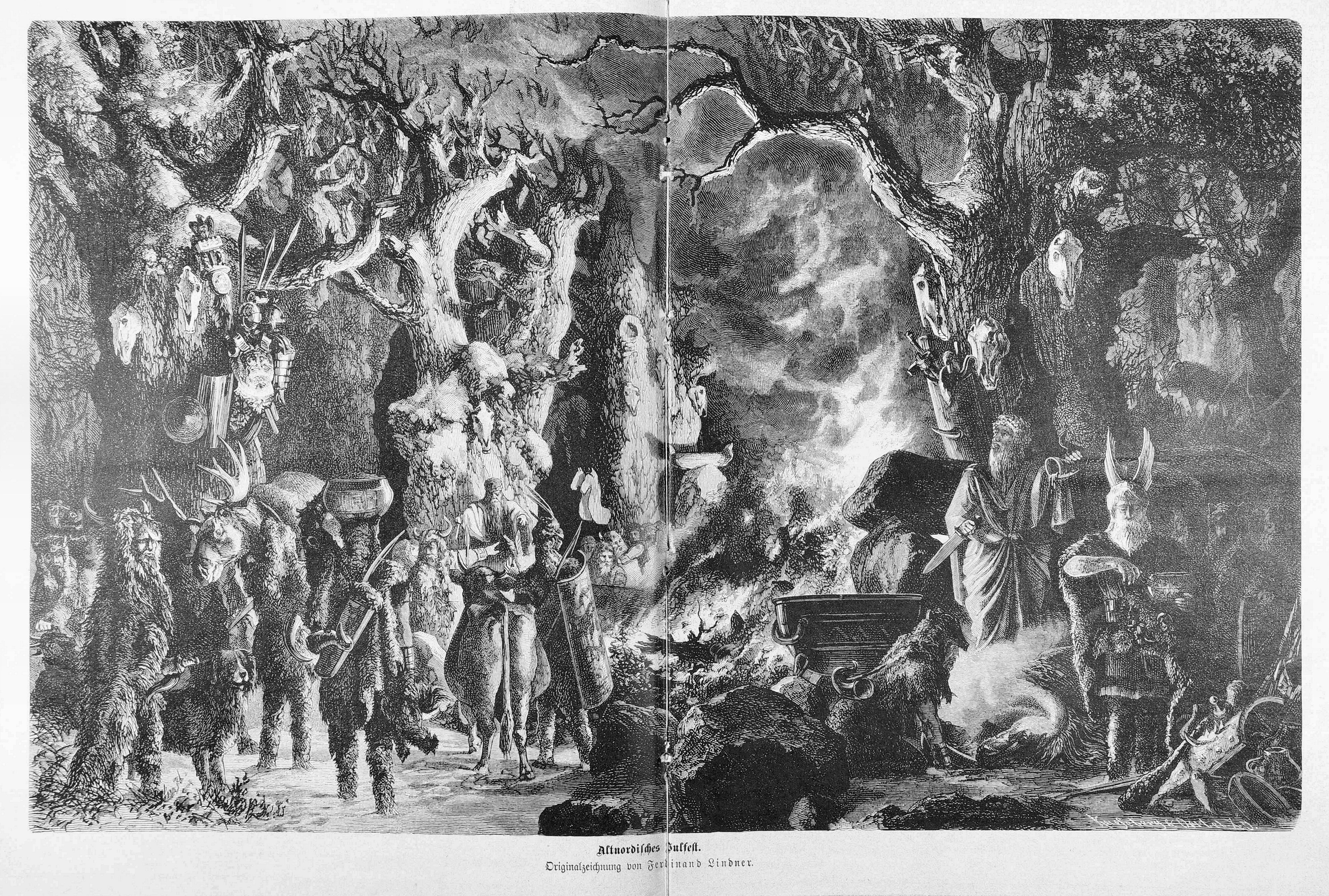
Illustration of an Old Nordic Yule festival, from Die Gartenlaube, 1880

In the sixth century, the Greek historian Procopius wrote that the people of Scandinavia (which he calls Thule) held their greatest festival shortly after the winter solstice, to celebrate the return of daylight.

In Anglo-Saxon England the winter solstice was generally deemed to be December 25, and in Old English, midwinter could mean both the winter solstice and Christmas. In the eighth century, Bede wrote that the pagan Anglo-Saxons had celebrated the festival Mōdraniht ('Mothers' Night') at the winter solstice, which marked the start of the Anglo-Saxon year.

Bede also wrote that the pagan Anglo-Saxons called both December and January Giuli. Bede links this term with the winter solstice, writing that "The months of Giuli derive their name from the day when the Sun turns back [and begins] to increase". This is an Old English form of the word 'Yule', and it is also spelled Geōl, Geōla and Iūla. Other Old English writers call December Ǣrra Geōla (the former Yule) and January Æftera Geōla (the latter Yule).

The North Germanic peoples celebrated a winter holiday called Jól, the Old Norse form of the word 'Yule'. The Heimskringla, written in the 13th century by the Icelander Snorri Sturluson, describes a Jól feast hosted by the Norwegian king Haakon the Good (c. 920–961). According to Snorri, the Christian Haakon had moved Jól from "midwinter" and aligned it with Christmas. This led some scholars to believe that Scandinavian Yule (Jól) originally was a sun festival on the winter solstice. Modern scholars generally do not believe this, as the medieval Icelandic "midwinter" (miðvetr) was about four weeks after the solstice. During the Christianisation of the Germanic peoples, Yule was incorporated into the Christmas celebrations and the term and its cognates still refer to Christmas in modern Northern European languages such as Swedish.

=== Albanian ===
Albanian traditional festivities around the winter solstice celebrate the return of the Sun (Dielli) for summer and the lengthening of the days. The Albanian traditional rites during the winter solstice period are pagan, and very ancient. Albanologist Johann Georg von Hahn (1811 – 1869) reported that Christian clergy, during his time and before, have vigorously fought the pagan rites that were practiced by Albanians to celebrate this festivity, but without success.

The old rites of this festivity were accompanied by collective fires (zjarre) based on the house, kinship or neighborhood, a practice performed in order to give strength to the Sun according to the old beliefs. The rites related to the cult of vegetation, which expressed the desire for increased production in agriculture and animal husbandry, were accompanied by animal sacrifices to the fire, lighting pine trees at night, luck divination tests with crackling in the fire or with coins in ritual bread, making and consuming ritual foods, performing various magical ritualistic actions in livestock, fields, vineyards and orchards, and so on.

Nata e Buzmit, "Yule log's night", is celebrated between December 22 and January 6. Buzmi is a ritualistic piece of wood (or several pieces of wood) that is put to burn in the fire (zjarri) of the hearth (vatër) on the night of a winter celebration that falls after the return of the Sun for summer (after the winter solstice), sometimes on the night of Kërshëndella on December 24 (Christmas Eve), sometimes on the night of kolendra, or sometimes on New Year's Day or on any other occasion around the same period, a tradition that is originally related to the cult of the Sun.

=== East Asian ===
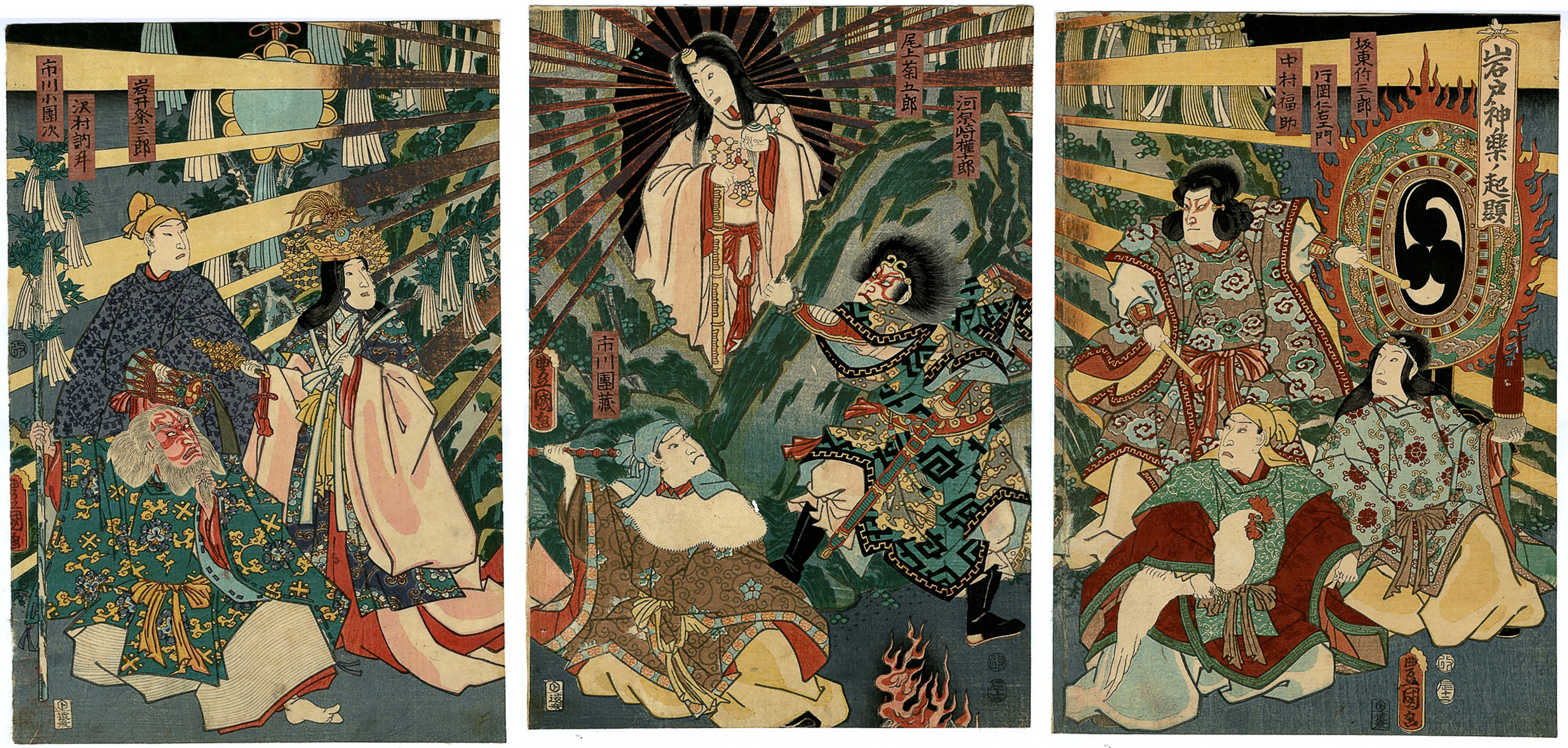
Japanese Sun goddess Amaterasu emerging from a cave (by Kunisada)

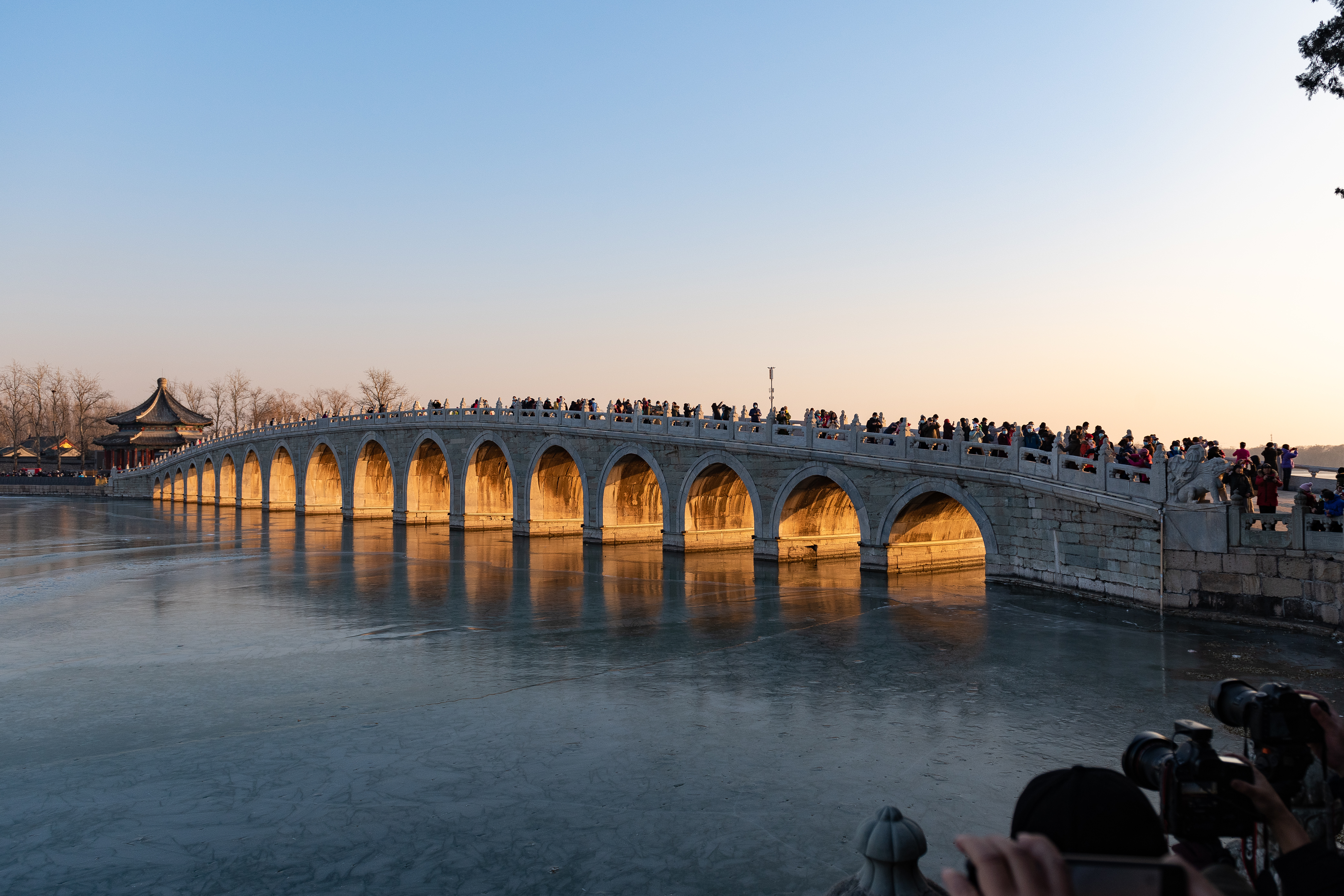
Sunlight directed through the 17 arches of Seventeen Arch Bridge, Summer Palace, Beijing around winter solstice

In East Asia, the winter solstice has been celebrated as one of the Twenty-four Solar Terms, called Dongzhi (冬至) in Chinese. In Japan, in order not to catch cold in the winter, there is a custom to soak oneself in a yuzu hot bath (Japanese: 柚子湯 = Yuzuyu).

=== Indian ===
Makara Sankranti, also known as Makara Sankrānti (Sanskrit: मकर संक्रांति) or Maghi, is a festival day in the Hindu calendar, in reference to deity Surya (sun). It is observed each year in January. It marks the first day of Sun's transit into Makara (Capricorn), marking the end of the month with the winter solstice and the start of longer days.

=== Iranian ===
Iranian people celebrate the night of the Northern Hemisphere's winter solstice as, "Yalda night", which is known to be the "longest and darkest night of the year". Yalda night celebration, or as some call it "Shabe Chelleh" ("the 40th night"), is one of the oldest Iranian traditions that has been present in Persian culture from ancient times. In this night all the family gather together, usually at the house of the eldest, and celebrate it by eating, drinking and reciting poetry (esp. Hafez). Nuts, pomegranates and watermelons are particularly served during this festival.

=== Judaic ===
An Aggadic legend found in tractate Avodah Zarah 8a puts forth the talmudic hypothesis that Adam first established the tradition of fasting before the winter solstice, and rejoicing afterward, which festival later developed into the Roman Saturnalia and Kalendae.

When the First Man saw that the day was continuously shortening, he said, "Woe is me! Because I have sinned, the world darkens around me, and returns to formlessless and void. This is the death to which Heaven has sentenced me!" He decided to spend eight days in fasting and prayer. When he saw the winter solstice, and he saw that the day was continuously lengthening, he said, "It is the order of the world!" He went and feasted for eight days. The following year, he feasted for both. He established them in Heaven's name, but they established them in the name of idolatry

== Observation ==
UT date and time of equinoxes and solstices on Earth
event	equinox		solstice		equinox		solstice	
month	March		June		September		December	
year	day	time	day	time	day	time	day	time
2016	20	04:31	20	22:35	22	14:21	21	10:45
2017	20	10:29	21	04:25	22	20:02	21	16:29
2018	20	16:15	21	10:07	23	01:54	21	22:22
2019	20	21:58	21	15:54	23	07:50	22	04:19
2020	20	03:50	20	21:43	22	13:31	21	10:03
2021	20	09:37	21	03:32	22	19:21	21	15:59
2022	20	15:33	21	09:14	23	01:04	21	21:48
2023	20	21:25	21	14:58	23	06:50	22	03:28
2024	20	03:07	20	20:51	22	12:44	21	09:20
2025	20	09:01	21	02:42	22	18:19	21	15:03
2026	20	14:46	21	08:25	23	00:06	21	20:50
2027	20	20:25	21	14:11	23	06:02	22	02:43
2028	20	02:17	20	20:02	22	11:45	21	08:20
2029	20	08:01	21	01:48	22	17:37	21	14:14
2030	20	13:51	21	07:31	22	23:27	21	20:09
2031	20	19:41	21	13:17	23	05:15	22	01:56
2032	20	01:23	20	19:09	22	11:11	21	07:57
2033	20	07:23	21	01:01	22	16:52	21	13:45
2034	20	13:18	21	06:45	22	22:41	21	19:35
2035	20	19:03	21	12:33	23	04:39	22	01:31
2036	20	01:02	20	18:31	22	10:23	21	07:12

Although the instant of the solstice can be calculated, direct observation of the moment by visual perception is elusive. The Sun moves too slowly or appears to stand still (the meaning of "solstice"). However, by use of astronomical data tracking, the precise timing of its occurrence is now public knowledge. The precise instant of the solstice cannot be directly detected (by definition, people cannot observe that an object has stopped moving until it is later observed that it has not moved further from the preceding spot, or that it has moved in the opposite direction). To be precise to a single day, observers must be able to view a change in azimuth or elevation less than or equal to about 1/60 of the angular diameter of the Sun. Observing that it occurred within a two-day period is easier, requiring an observation precision of only about 1/16 of the angular diameter of the Sun. Thus, many observations are of the day of the solstice rather than the instant. This is often done by observing sunrise and sunset or using an astronomically aligned instrument that allows a ray of light to be cast on a certain point around that time. The earliest sunset and latest sunrise dates differ from winter solstice, however, and these depend on latitude, due to the variation in the solar day throughout the year caused by the Earth's elliptical orbit (see earliest and latest sunrise and sunset).

== List of winter solstice festivals and observances ==
- Alban Arthan (Druidism)
- Blue Christmas (Western Christian)
- Dies Natalis Solis Invicti (Ancient Rome)
- Dongzhi Festival (East Asia)
- Inti Raymi (Inca)
- Koliada and Korochun (Slavic)
- Midwinter Day (Antarctica)
- Mōdraniht (Anglo-Saxon paganism)
- Shalako (Zuni people)
- Uttarayana (India)
- We Tripantu (Mapuche)
- Willkakuti (Aymara people)
- Yalda Night (Western and Central Asia)
- Yule (Germanic)
- Ziemassvētki (Latvia)
- Pongal (Tamil Nadu) ( India)

=== Other related festivals ===
- Feast of Ezid (Yazidi) – celebrated on the last Friday before winter solstice
- Saturnalia and Brumalia (Ancient Rome)
- Wren Day (Ireland, Isle of Man)
- Saint Lucy's Day (Christian) – used to fall on the winter solstice, now celebrated on December 13
- Cold Food Festival (Greater China, Korea) – 105 days after winter solstice
- Makar Sankranti (India): Harvest Festival – 24 days after the winter solstice
- Burning the Clocks (England) – modern cultural festival on the winter solstice
- Winter at Tantora Festival (Saudi Arabia) – modern cultural festival
- Saint John's Eve in the southern hemisphere

== See also ==
- Effect of Sun angle on climate
- Festival of Lights (disambiguation)
- Festive ecology
- Festivus
- Halcyon days
- Hanukkah
- Christmas Eve
- Christmas
- Kwanzaa
- New Year's Eve
- New Year's Day
- HumanLight
- Tekufah
