= Solstice =

Twice-annual astronomical event when the Sun is farthest from above the Earth's equator

UT date and time of equinoxes and solstices on Earth
event	equinox		solstice		equinox		solstice	
month	March		June		September		December	
year	day	time	day	time	day	time	day	time
2016	20	04:31	20	22:35	22	14:21	21	10:45
2017	20	10:29	21	04:25	22	20:02	21	16:29
2018	20	16:15	21	10:07	23	01:54	21	22:22
2019	20	21:58	21	15:54	23	07:50	22	04:19
2020	20	03:50	20	21:43	22	13:31	21	10:03
2021	20	09:37	21	03:32	22	19:21	21	15:59
2022	20	15:33	21	09:14	23	01:04	21	21:48
2023	20	21:25	21	14:58	23	06:50	22	03:28
2024	20	03:07	20	20:51	22	12:44	21	09:20
2025	20	09:01	21	02:42	22	18:19	21	15:03
2026	20	14:46	21	08:25	23	00:06	21	20:50
2027	20	20:25	21	14:11	23	06:02	22	02:43
2028	20	02:17	20	20:02	22	11:45	21	08:20
2029	20	08:01	21	01:48	22	17:37	21	14:14
2030	20	13:51	21	07:31	22	23:27	21	20:09
2031	20	19:41	21	13:17	23	05:15	22	01:56
2032	20	01:23	20	19:09	22	11:11	21	07:57
2033	20	07:23	21	01:01	22	16:52	21	13:45
2034	20	13:18	21	06:45	22	22:41	21	19:35
2035	20	19:03	21	12:33	23	04:39	22	01:31
2036	20	01:02	20	18:31	22	10:23	21	07:12

A solstice is the time when the Sun reaches its most northerly or southerly sun path relative to the celestial equator on the celestial sphere. Two solstices occur annually, around 20–22 June and 20–22 December. In many countries, the seasons of the year are defined by reference to the solstices and the equinoxes.

The term solstice can also be used in a broader sense, as the day when this occurs. For locations not too close to the equator or the poles, the dates with the longest and shortest periods of daylight are the summer and winter solstices, respectively. Terms with no ambiguity as to which hemisphere is the context are "June solstice" and "December solstice", referring to the months in which they take place every year.

== Etymology ==
The word solstice is derived from the Latin sol ('sun') and sistere ('to stand still'), because at the solstices, the Sun's declination appears to "stand still"; that is, the seasonal movement of the Sun's daily path (as seen from Earth) reaches a northern or southern limit before reversing direction.

Solstice first entered into English in the Middle English period. An older term in English is its calque sunstead (Old English: sunstede), which became rare after the 17th century. Sunstead is cognate with other terms with the same meaning in other Germanic language such as Old Norse: sólstaðr and Middle High German: sunnenstat. A similar English calque of the Latin term is sunstay which was first used in the 16th century and is now also rare.

== Definitions and frames of reference ==
The seasons (with the transition points of the June solstice, September equinox, December solstice, and March equinox) and Earth's orbit characteristics.

For an observer at the North Pole, the Sun reaches the highest position in the sky once a year in June. The day this occurs is called the June solstice day. Similarly, for an observer on the South Pole, the Sun reaches the highest position on the December solstice day. When it is the summer solstice at one Pole, it is the winter solstice on the other. The Sun's westerly motion never ceases as Earth is continually in rotation. However, at the moment of solstice the Sun's motion in declination (i.e. vertically) appears to stop for an instant, and then reverse. In that sense, solstice means "sun-standing".

This modern scientific word descends from a Latin scientific word in use in the late Roman Republic of the 1st century BC: solstitium. Pliny uses it a number of times in his Natural History with a similar meaning that it has today. It contains two Latin-language morphemes, sol, "sun", and -stitium, "stoppage". The Romans used "standing" to refer to a component of the relative velocity of the Sun as it is observed in the sky. Relative velocity is the motion of an object from the point of view of an observer in a frame of reference. From a fixed position on the ground, the Sun appears to orbit around Earth.

To an observer in an inertial frame of reference, planet Earth is seen to rotate about an axis and orbit around the Sun in an elliptical path with the Sun at one focus. Earth's axis is tilted with respect to the plane of Earth's orbit and this axis maintains a position that changes little with respect to the background of stars. An observer on Earth therefore sees a solar path that is the result of both rotation and revolution.

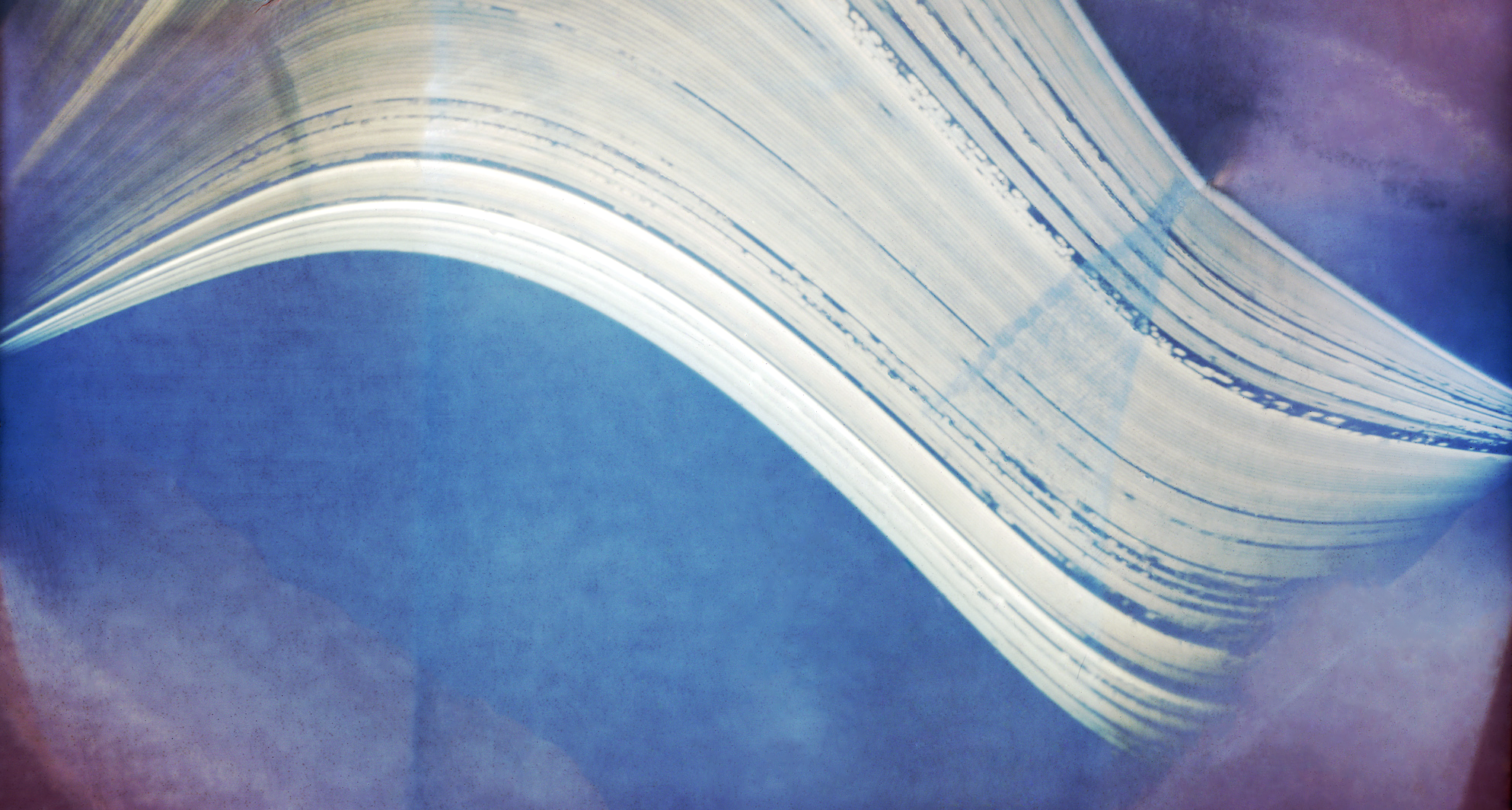
A solargraph taken from the Atacama Pathfinder Experiment at the Llano de Chajnantor Observatory in the southern hemisphere. This is a long-exposure photograph, with the image exposed for six months in a direction facing east of north, from mid-December 2009 until the southern winter solstice in June 2010. The Sun's path each day can be seen from right to left in this image across the sky; the path of the following day runs slightly lower until the day of the winter solstice, whose path is the lowest one in the image.

The component of the Sun's motion seen by an earthbound observer caused by the revolution of the tilted axis—which, keeping the same angle in space, is oriented toward or away from the Sun—is an observed daily increment (and lateral offset) of the elevation of the Sun at noon for approximately six months and observed daily decrement for the remaining six months. At maximum or minimum elevation, the relative yearly motion of the Sun perpendicular to the horizon stops and reverses direction.

Outside of the tropics, the maximum elevation occurs at the summer solstice and the minimum at the winter solstice. The path of the Sun, or ecliptic, sweeps north and south between the northern and southern hemispheres. The lengths of time when the sun is up are longer around the summer solstice and shorter around the winter solstice, except near the equator. When the Sun's path crosses the equator, the length of the nights at latitudes +L° and −L° are of equal length. This is known as an equinox. There are two solstices and two equinoxes in a tropical year.

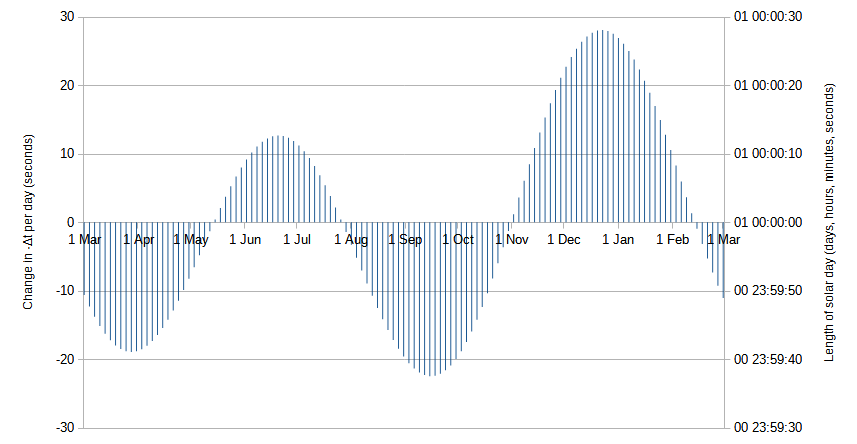
Derivative of −Δt, the so-called Equation of time. The axis on the right shows the length of the solar day, also called the synodic day.

Because of the variation in the rate at which the sun's right ascension changes, the days of longest and shortest daylight do not coincide with the solstices for locations very close to the equator. At the equator, the longest day is around 23 December and the shortest around 16 September (see graph). Inside the Arctic or Antarctic Circles the sun is up all the time for days or even months.

== Relationship to seasons ==
The seasons occur because the Earth's axis of rotation is not perpendicular to its orbital plane (the plane of the ecliptic) but currently makes an angle of about 23.44° (called the obliquity of the ecliptic), and because the axis keeps its orientation with respect to an inertial frame of reference. As a consequence, for half the year the Northern Hemisphere is inclined toward the Sun while for the other half year the Southern Hemisphere has this distinction. The two moments when the inclination of Earth's rotational axis has maximum effect are the solstices.

At the June solstice the subsolar point is further north than any other time: at latitude 23.44° north, known as the Tropic of Cancer. Similarly at the December solstice the subsolar point is further south than any other time: at latitude 23.44° south, known as the Tropic of Capricorn. The subsolar point will cross every latitude between these two extremes exactly twice per year.

Approximate subsolar point dates vs. latitude superimposed on a world map, the example in blue denoting Lahaina Noon in Honolulu.

Also during the June solstice, places on the Arctic Circle (latitude 66.56° north) will see the Sun just on the horizon during midnight, and all places north of it will see the Sun above horizon for 24 hours. That is the midnight sun or midsummer-night sun or polar day. On the other hand, places on the Antarctic Circle (latitude 66.56° south) will see the Sun just on the horizon during midday, and all places south of it will not see the Sun above horizon at any time of the day. That is the polar night. During the December Solstice, the effects on both hemispheres are just the opposite. This sees polar sea ice re-grow annually due to lack of sunlight on the air above and surrounding sea. The warmest and coldest periods of the year in temperate regions are offset by about one month from the solstices, delayed by the earth's thermal inertia.

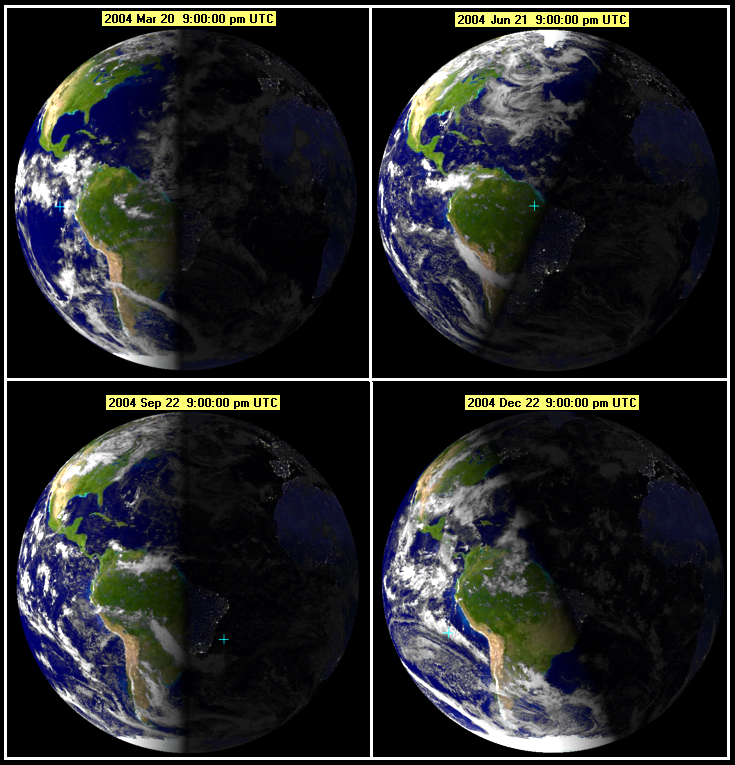
Orientation of the terminator (division between night and day) depends on the season.

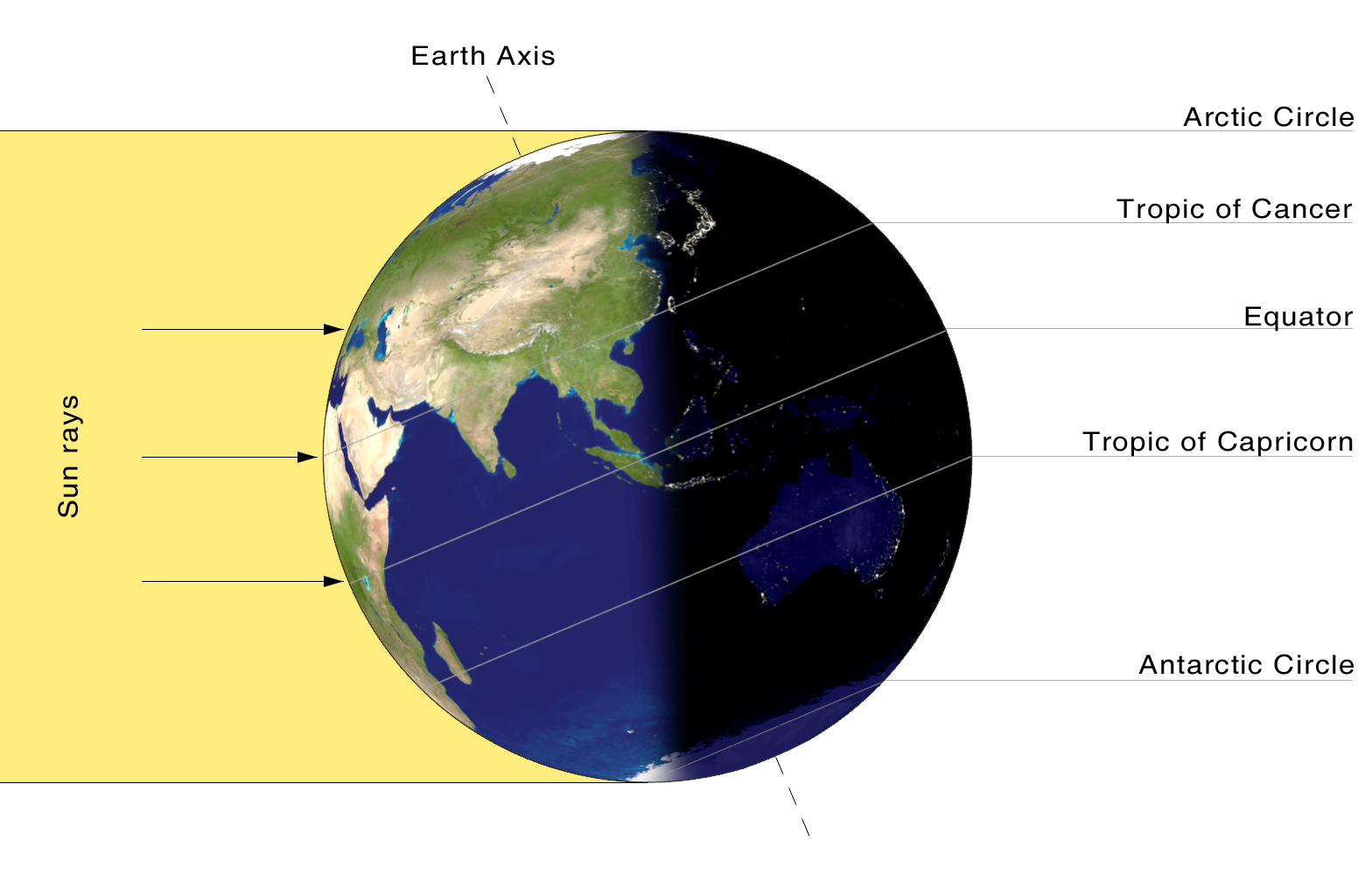
Illumination of Earth by Sun on 21 June. The orientation of the terminator shown with respect to the Earth's orbital plane.

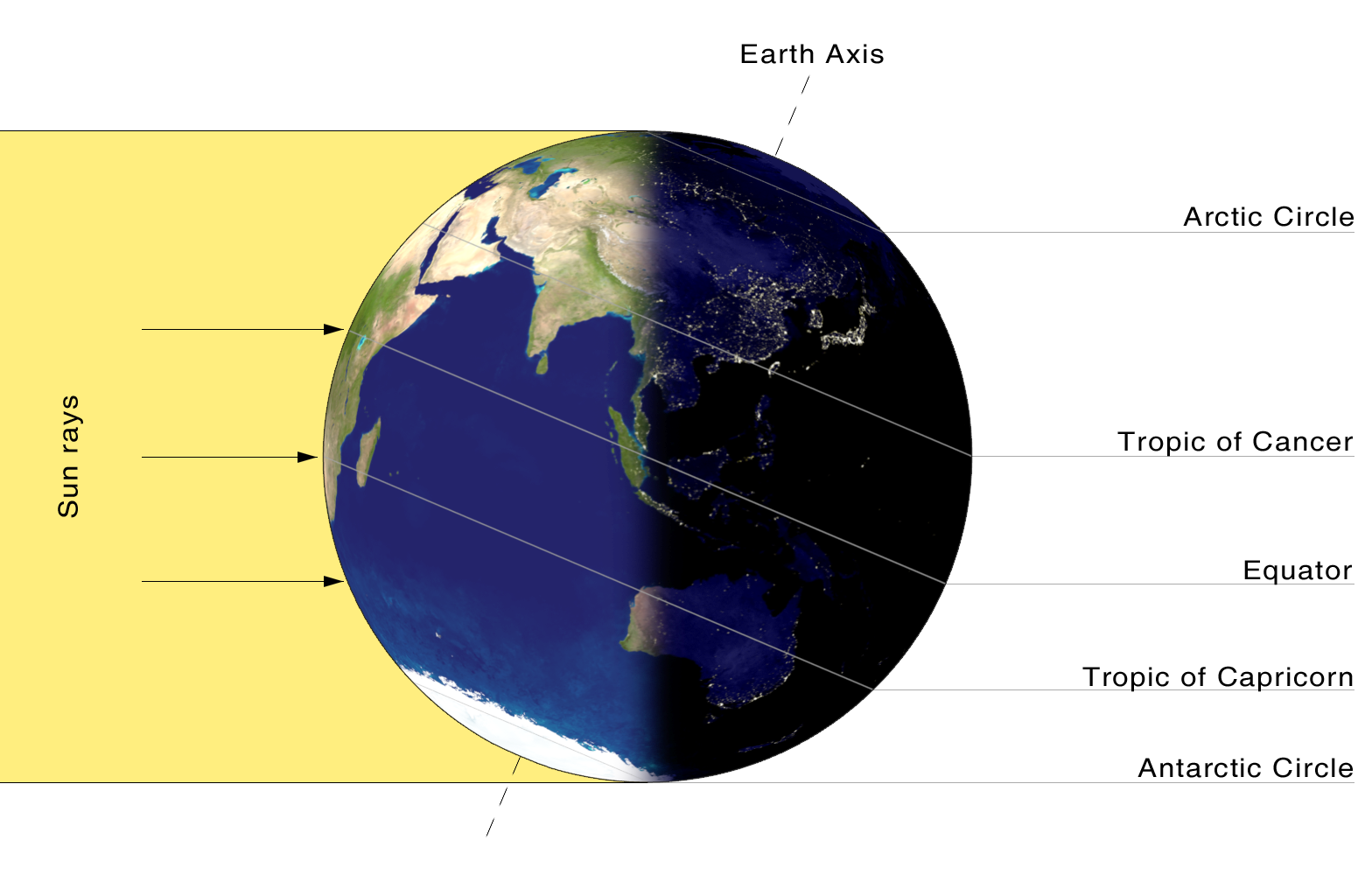
Illumination of Earth by Sun on 21 December. The orientation of the terminator shown with respect to the Earth's orbital plane.

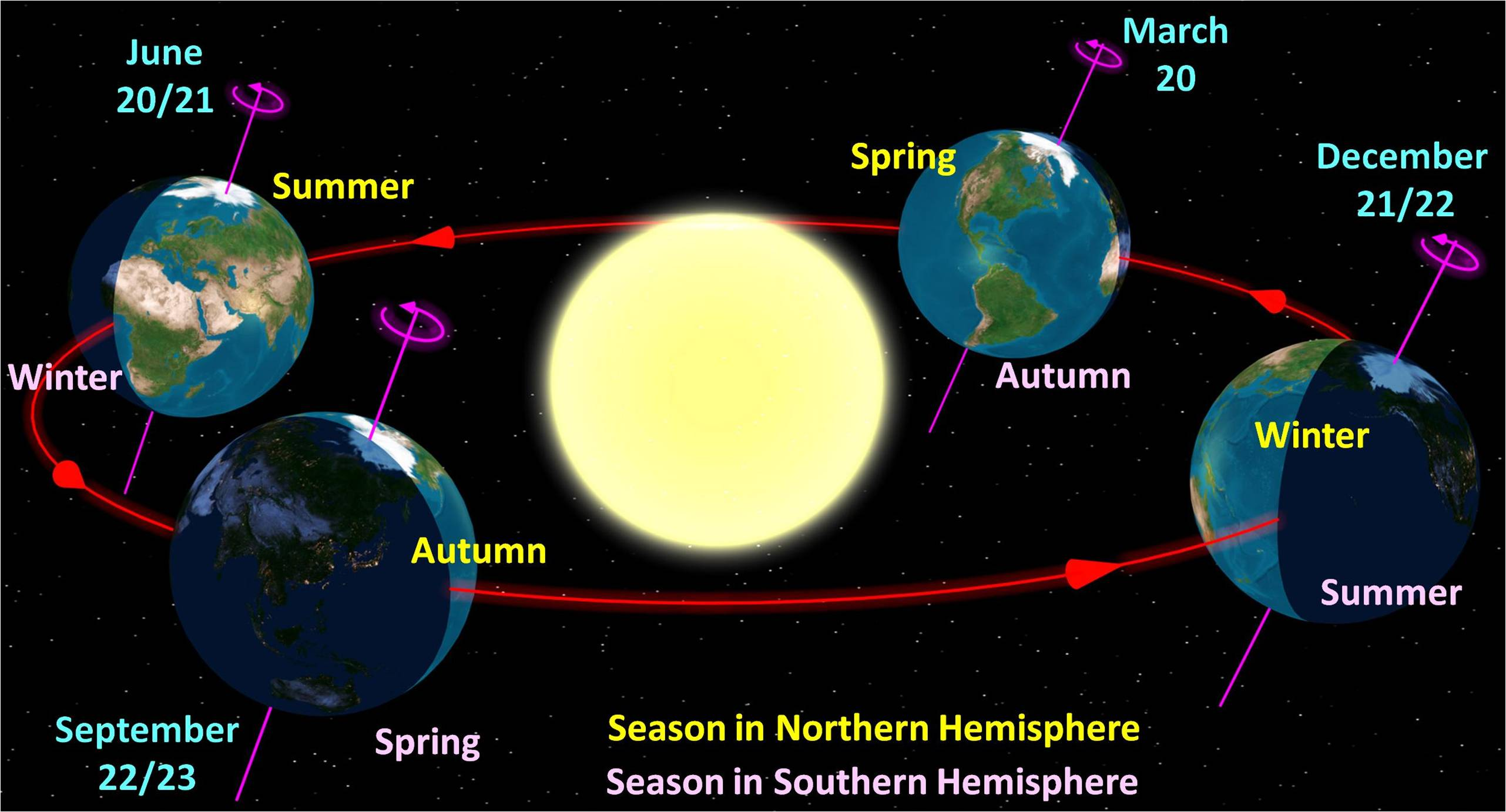
Diagram of the Earth's seasons as seen from the north. Far right: southern solstice

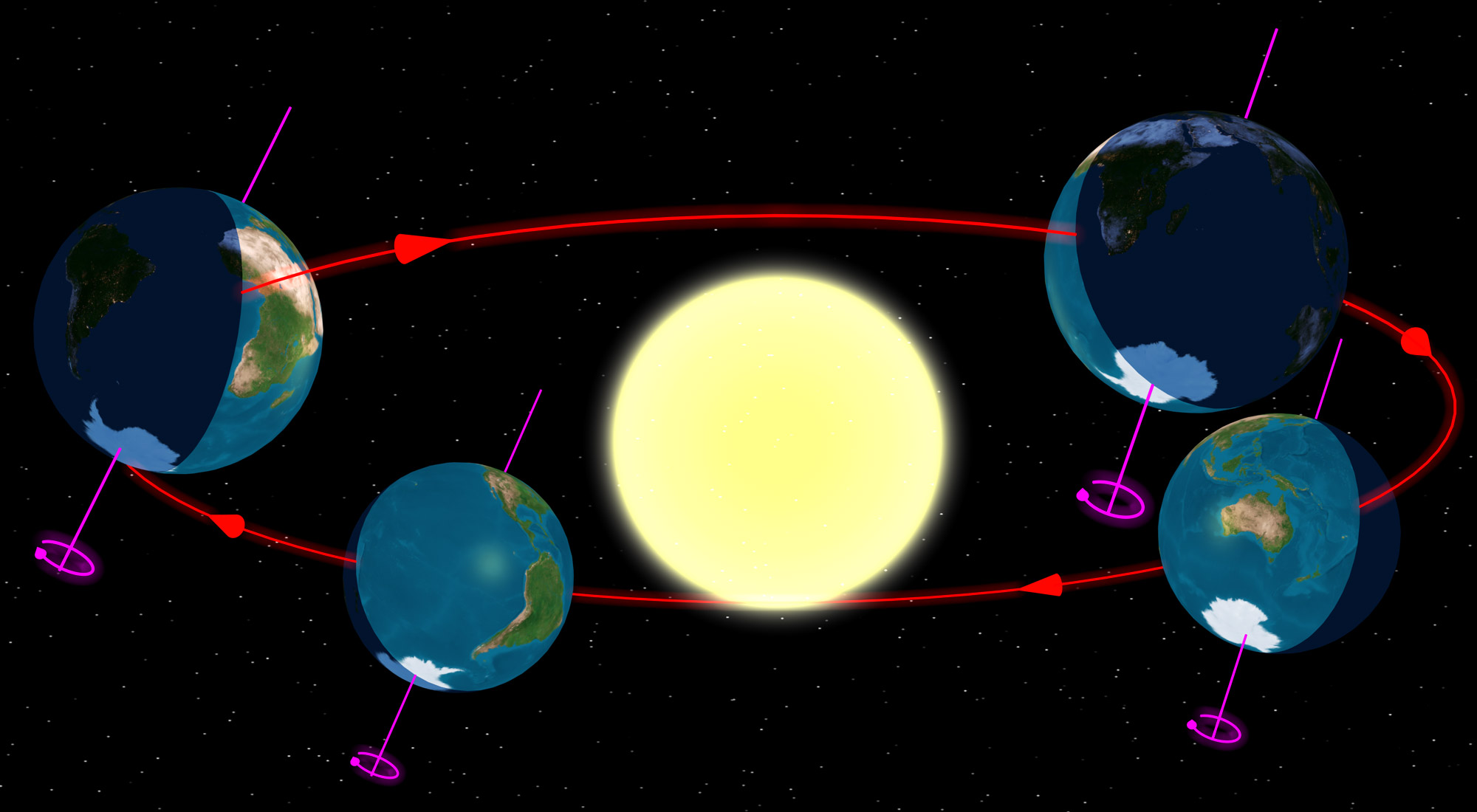
Diagram of the Earth's seasons as seen from the south. Far left: northern solstice

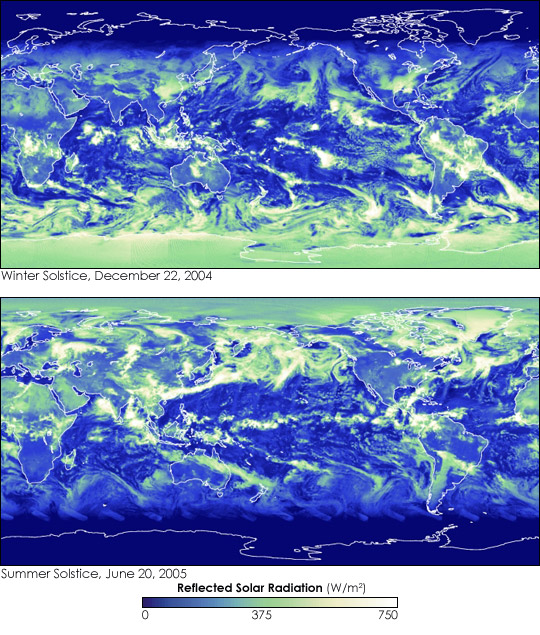
The globe on an equirectangular projection to show the amount of reflected sunlight at southern and northern summer solstices, respectively (watts / m^{2}).

== Cultural aspects ==
=== Ancient Greek names and concepts ===
The concept of the solstices was embedded in ancient Greek celestial navigation. As soon as they discovered that the Earth was spherical they devised the concept of the celestial sphere, an imaginary spherical surface rotating with the heavenly bodies (ouranioi) fixed in it (the modern one does not rotate, but the stars in it do). As long as no assumptions are made concerning the distances of those bodies from Earth or from each other, the sphere can be accepted as real and is in fact still in use. The Ancient Greeks use the term "ηλιοστάσιο" (heliostāsio), meaning stand of the Sun.

The stars move across the inner surface of the celestial sphere along the circumferences of circles in parallel planes perpendicular to the Earth's axis extended indefinitely into the heavens and intersecting the celestial sphere in a celestial pole. The Sun and the planets do not move in these parallel paths but along another circle, the ecliptic, whose plane is at an angle, the obliquity of the ecliptic, to the axis, bringing the Sun and planets across the paths of and in among the stars.*

Cleomedes states:

The band of the Zodiac (zōdiakos kuklos, "zodiacal circle") is at an oblique angle (loksos) because it is positioned between the tropical circles and equinoctial circle touching each of the tropical circles at one point ... This Zodiac has a determinable width (set at 8° today) ... that is why it is described by three circles: the central one is called "heliacal" (hēliakos, "of the sun").

The term heliacal circle is used for the ecliptic, which is in the center of the zodiacal circle, conceived as a band including the noted constellations named on mythical themes. Other authors use Zodiac to mean ecliptic, which first appears in a gloss of unknown author in a passage of Cleomedes where he is explaining that the Moon is in the zodiacal circle as well and periodically crosses the path of the Sun. As some of these crossings represent eclipses of the Moon, the path of the Sun is given a synonym, the ekleiptikos (kuklos) from ekleipsis, "eclipse".

=== English names ===
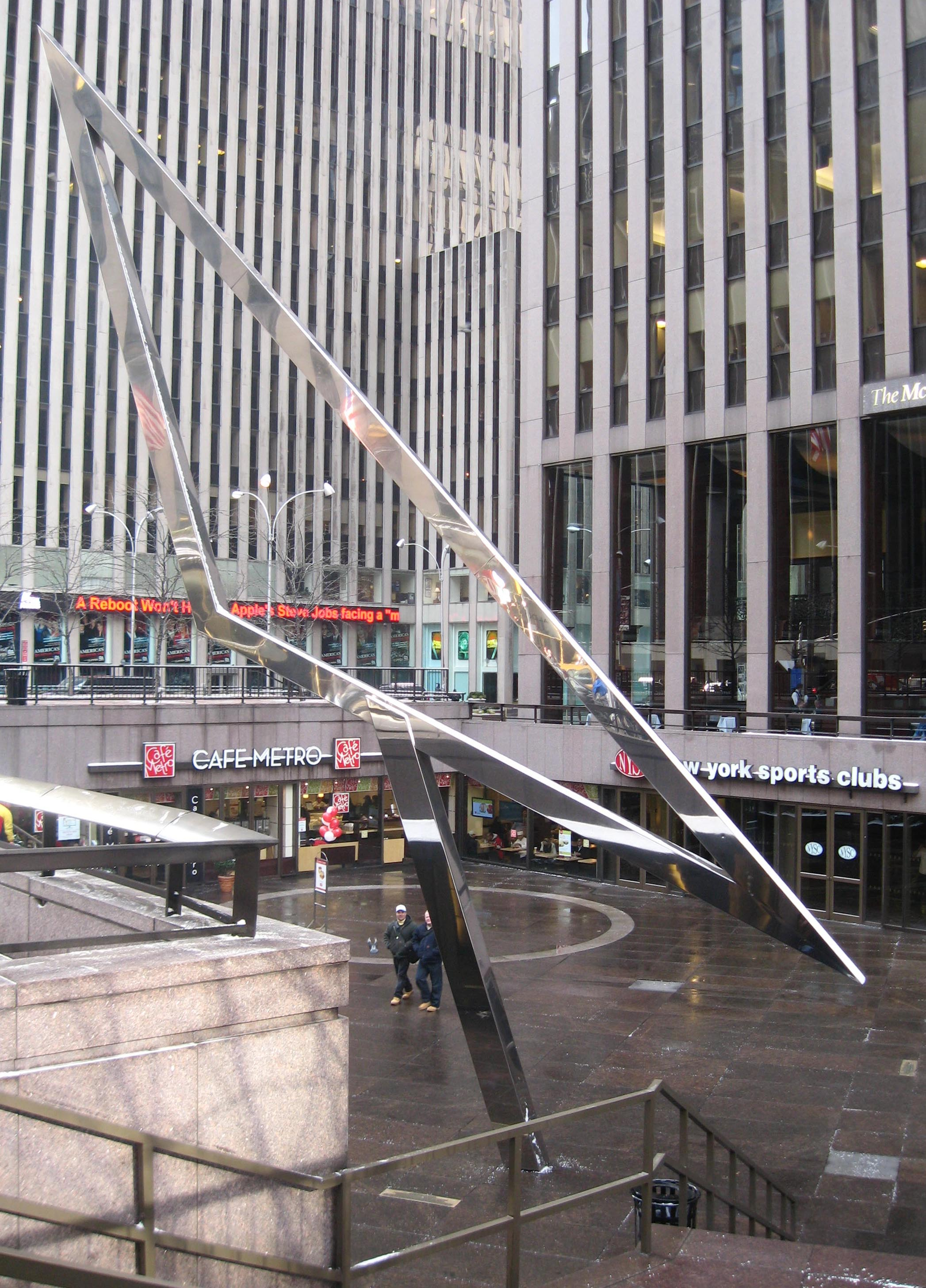
Sun Triangle in New York points at Sun upon equinox and solstices

The two solstices can be distinguished by different pairs of names, depending on which feature one wants to stress.

- Summer solstice and winter solstice are the most common names, referring to the seasons they are associated with. However, these can be ambiguous since the Northern Hemisphere's summer is the Southern Hemisphere's winter, and vice versa. The Latinate names estival solstice (summer) and hibernal solstice (winter) are sometimes used to the same effect, as are midsummer and midwinter.
- June solstice and December solstice refer to the months of year in which they take place, with no ambiguity as to which hemisphere is the context. They are still not universal, however, as not all cultures use a solar-based calendar where the solstices occur every year in the same month (as they do not in the Islamic calendar and Hebrew calendar, for example).
- Northern solstice and southern solstice indicate the hemisphere of the Sun's location. The northern solstice is in June, when the Sun is directly over the Tropic of Cancer in the Northern Hemisphere, and the southern solstice is in December, when the Sun is directly over the Tropic of Capricorn in the Southern Hemisphere. These terms can be used unambiguously for other planets.
- First point of Cancer and first point of Capricorn refer to the astrological signs that the sun "is entering" (a system rooted in Roman Classical period dates). Due to the precession of the equinoxes, the constellations the sun appears in at solstices are currently Taurus in June and Sagittarius in December.

Names of the equinoxes and solstices
Ls	By date (Gregorian calendar)	By sun position (subsolar point)	By season (Northern Hemisphere)	By season (Southern Hemisphere)
0°	March equinox	Northward equinox	Vernal (spring) equinox	Autumnal (fall) equinox
90°	June solstice	Northern solstice	Estival (summer) solstice	Hibernal (winter) solstice
180°	September equinox	Southward equinox	Autumnal (fall) equinox	Vernal (spring) equinox
270°	December solstice	Southern solstice	Hibernal (winter) solstice	Estival (summer) solstice

=== Solstice terms in East Asia ===
The traditional East Asian calendars divide a year into 24 solar terms (節氣). Xiàzhì (pīnyīn) or Geshi (rōmaji) (Chinese and Japanese: 夏至; Korean: 하지(Haji); Vietnamese: Hạ chí; lit. summer's extreme) is the 10th solar term, and marks the summer solstice. It begins when the Sun reaches the celestial longitude of 90° (around 21 June) and ends when the Sun reaches the longitude of 105° (around 7 July). Xiàzhì more often refers in particular to the day when the Sun is exactly at the celestial longitude of 90°.

Dōngzhì (pīnyīn) or Tōji (rōmaji) (Chinese and Japanese: 冬至; Korean: 동지(Dongji); Vietnamese: Đông chí; lit. winter's extreme) is the 22nd solar term, and marks the winter solstice. It begins when the Sun reaches the celestial longitude of 270° (around 22 December) and ends when the Sun reaches the longitude of 285° (around 6 January). Dōngzhì more often refers in particular to the day when the Sun is exactly at the celestial longitude of 270°.

The solstices (as well as the equinoxes) mark the middle of the seasons in East Asian calendars. Here, the Chinese character 至 means "extreme", so the terms for the solstices directly signify the summits of summer and winter.

=== Solstice celebrations ===
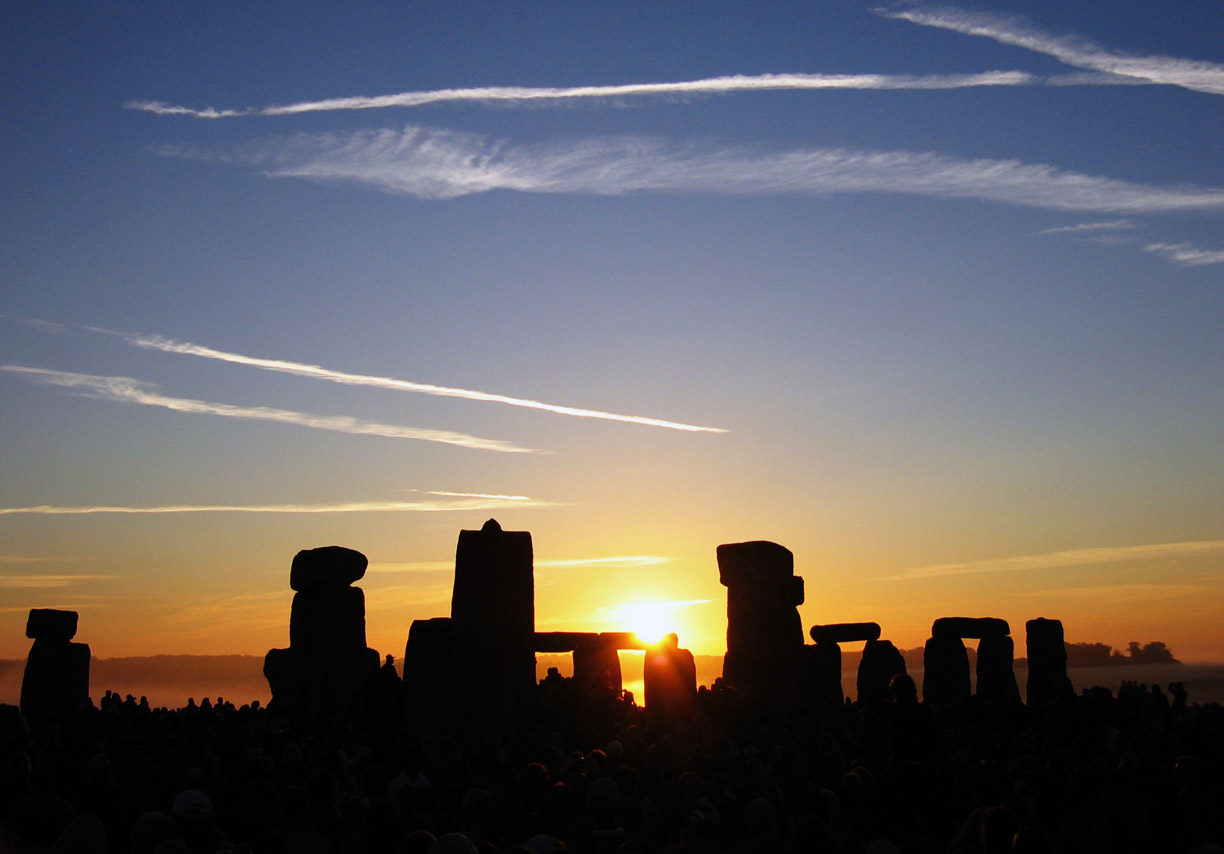
2005 Summer solstice sunrise over Stonehenge

The term solstice can also be used in a wider sense, as the date (day) that such a passage happens. The solstices, together with the equinoxes, are connected with the seasons. In some languages they are considered to start or separate the seasons; in others they are considered to be centre points (in England, in the Northern Hemisphere, for example, the period around the northern solstice is known as midsummer). Midsummer's Day, defined as St. Johns Day by the Christian Church, is 24 June, about three days after the solstice itself). Similarly 25 December is the start of the Christmas celebration, and is the day the Sun begins to return to the Northern Hemisphere. The traditional British and Irish main rent and meeting days of the year, "the usual quarter days," were often those of the solstices and equinoxes.

Many cultures celebrate various combinations of the winter and summer solstices, the equinoxes, and the midpoints between them, leading to various holidays arising around these events. During the southern or winter solstice, Christmas is the most widespread contemporary holiday, while Yalda, Saturnalia, Karachun, Hanukkah, Kwanzaa, and Yule are also celebrated around this time. In East Asian cultures, the Dongzhi Festival is celebrated on the winter solstice. For the northern or summer solstice, Christian cultures celebrate the feast of St. John from June 23 to 24 (see St. John's Eve, Ivan Kupala Day), while Modern Pagans observe Midsummer, known as Litha among Wiccans. For the vernal (spring) equinox, several springtime festivals are celebrated, such as the Persian Nowruz, the observance in Judaism of Passover, the rites of Easter in most Christian churches, as well as the Wiccan Ostara. The autumnal equinox is associated with the Jewish holiday of Sukkot and the Wiccan Mabon.

In the southern tip of South America, the Mapuche people celebrate We Tripantu (the New Year) a few days after the northern solstice, on 24 June. Further north, the Atacama people formerly celebrated this date with a noise festival, to call the Sun back. Further east, the Aymara people celebrate their New Year on 21 June. A celebration occurs at sunrise, when the sun shines directly through the Gate of the Sun in Tiwanaku. Other Aymara New Year feasts occur throughout Bolivia, including at the site of El Fuerte de Samaipata.

In the Hindu calendar, two sidereal solstices are named Makara Sankranti which marks the start of Uttarayana and Karka Sankranti which marks the start of Dakshinayana. The former occurs around 14 January each year, while the latter occurs around 14 July each year. These mark the movement of the Sun along a sidereally fixed zodiac (precession is ignored) into Makara, the zodiacal sign which corresponds with Capricorn, and into Karka, the zodiacal sign which corresponds with Cancer, respectively.

The solstice of 21 June is celebrated as Midwinter Day in Antarctic stations including, but not limited to, American stations (McMurdo Station, Palmer Station, Amundsen–Scott South Pole Station), Australian stations (Casey Station), and British stations (Bird Island, Rothera Research Station, King Edward Point, Halley VI). The celebration is dedicated to the southern winter solstice, which results in the shortest day in Antarctica.

The Fremont Solstice Parade takes place every summer solstice in Fremont, Seattle, Washington in the United States.

The reconstructed Cahokia Woodhenge, a large timber circle located at the Mississippian culture Cahokia archaeological site near Collinsville, Illinois, is the site of annual equinox and solstice sunrise observances. Out of respect for Native American beliefs these events do not feature ceremonies or rituals of any kind.

=== Solstice determination ===
Unlike the equinox, the solstice time is not easy to determine. The changes in solar declination become smaller as the Sun gets closer to its maximum/minimum declination. The days before and after the solstice, the declination speed is less than 30 arcseconds per day which is less than 1/60 of the angular size of the Sun, or the equivalent to just 2 seconds of right ascension.

This difference is hardly detectable with indirect viewing based devices like sextant equipped with a vernier, and impossible with more traditional tools like a gnomon or an astrolabe. It is also hard to detect the changes in sunrise/sunset azimuth due to the atmospheric refraction changes. Those accuracy issues render it impossible to determine the solstice day based on observations made within the 3 (or even 5) days surrounding the solstice without the use of more complex tools.

Accounts do not survive but Greek astronomers must have used an approximation method based on interpolation, which is still used by some amateurs. This method consists of recording the declination angle at noon during some days before and after the solstice, trying to find two separate days with the same declination. When those two days are found, the halfway time between both noons is estimated solstice time. An interval of 45 days has been postulated as the best one to achieve up to a quarter-day precision, in the solstice determination. In 2012, the journal DIO found that accuracy of one or two hours with balanced errors can be attained by observing the Sun's equal altitudes about S = twenty degrees (or d = about 20 days) before and after the summer solstice because the average of the two times will be early by q arc minutes where q is (πe cosA)/3 times the square of S in degrees (e = earth orbit eccentricity, A = earth's perihelion or Sun's apogee), and the noise in the result will be about 41 hours divided by d if the eye's sharpness is taken as one arc minute.

Guo Shoujing, a Chinese astronomer, found that the taller the gnomon, the more acurately the journey of the sun could be measured. He designed the 12.6 metres (41 ft) gnomon constructed at Gaocheng Astronomical Observatory in 1276. The measurements from Gaocheng determined the length of the year to within one minute of the current measurement, a value in accord with the value of the Gregorian Calendar, but obtained 300 years earlier..

Astronomical almanacs define the solstices as the moments when the Sun passes through the solstitial colure, i.e. the times when the apparent geocentric celestial longitude of the Sun is equal to 90° (June solstice) or 270° (December solstice). The dates of the solstice varies each year and may occur a day earlier or later depending on the time zone. Because the earth's orbit takes slightly longer than a calendar year of 365 days, the solstices occur slightly later each calendar year, until a leap day re-aligns the calendar with the orbit. Thus the solstices always occur between June 20 and 22 and between December 20 and 23 in a four-year-long cycle with the 21st and 22nd being the most common dates, as can be seen in the schedule at the start of the article.

Currently, government organizations like USNO and IMCCE publish the date and time of the solstice.

== In the constellations ==
Using the current official IAU constellation boundaries—and taking into account the variable precession speed and the rotation of the ecliptic—the solstices shift through the constellations as follows (expressed in astronomical year numbering in which the year 0 = 1 BC, −1 = 2 BC, etc.):

- The northern solstice passed from Leo into Cancer in year −1458, passed into Gemini in year −10, passed into Taurus in December 1989, and is expected to pass into Aries in year 4609.
- The southern solstice passed from Capricornus into Sagittarius in year −130, is expected to pass into Ophiuchus in year 2269, and is expected to pass into Scorpius in year 3597.

== See also ==
- Analemma
- Geocentric view of the seasons
- Iranian calendars
- Perihelion and aphelion
- Wheel of the Year
- Zoroastrian calendar
