= We Tripantu =

Observance in Chile and Argentina

Wiñoy Tripantu is the Mapuche celebration that marks the return of the sun, often referred to as the Mapuche New Year. It occurs on the June solstice, which is the shortest day of the year in the Mapuche homeland in the Southern Hemisphere. Sometimes, the term We Tripantu is used interchangeably with Wiñoy Tripantu, but some Mapuche language speakers use We Tripantu for the Gregorian calendar New Year (January 1) and reserve Wiñoy Tripantu for the June solstice celebration.

There are various variations of the term Wiñoy Tripantu, including Wiñol xipantu, Wvñol xipantu, Wiñol Txipantu, and Wüñoy Tripantü.

This celebration is comparable to the Inti Raymi in Mapuche culture. As the sun begins to return to Earth after the longest night of the year (the winter solstice), Pachamama (Mother Earth in Quechua) or Nuke Mapu (in Mapudungun) starts to bloom, from the Andean heights to the southern tip. The sun, known as Antü in Mapuche, Inti in Aymara, or Rapa in Rapa Nui, brings life back to the land, and everything begins to flourish again.

Wiñoy Tripantu is observed with a ceremony on the shortest day of the year, where families and communities gather to celebrate together. Everyone in the community plays a role in the ceremony, which includes songs, dances, a communal meal, and offerings to the land. A traditional wood fire is lit and kept burning until sunrise the next day. Elders share stories with cultural, philosophical, and political significance, passing down Mapuche culture and history to the younger generations. The ceremony concludes with a communal breakfast.

While Wiñoy Tripantu has been a longstanding tradition in the Mapuche culture (nowadays in southern Argentina and Chile), it has experienced a revival in recent decades, coinciding with a broader resurgence of Mapuche cultural practices and land rights advocacy.
