= December solstice =

Annual solstice on 20–22 December

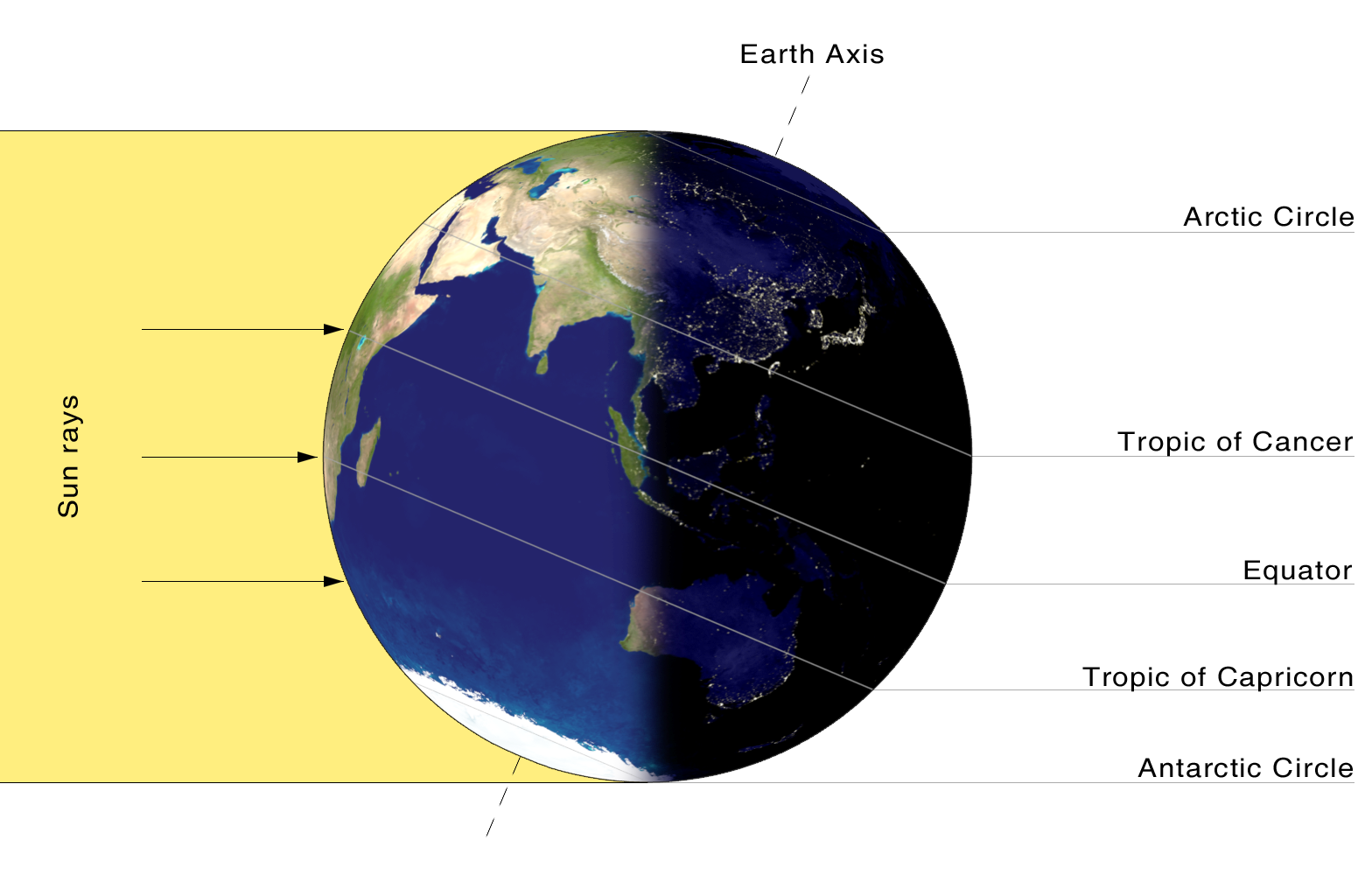
Illumination of Earth by the Sun on the day of the December solstice

The December solstice, also known as the southern solstice, is the solstice that occurs each December – typically on 21 December, but may vary by one day in either direction according to the Gregorian calendar. In the Northern Hemisphere, the December solstice is the winter solstice (the day with the shortest period of daylight), whilst in the Southern Hemisphere it is the summer solstice (the day with the longest period of daylight). During the December solstice, the Sun is directly over the Tropic of Capricorn, located in the Southern Hemisphere.

UT date and time of equinoxes and solstices on Earth
event	equinox		solstice		equinox		solstice	
month	March		June		September		December	
year	day	time	day	time	day	time	day	time
2016	20	04:31	20	22:35	22	14:21	21	10:45
2017	20	10:29	21	04:25	22	20:02	21	16:29
2018	20	16:15	21	10:07	23	01:54	21	22:22
2019	20	21:58	21	15:54	23	07:50	22	04:19
2020	20	03:50	20	21:43	22	13:31	21	10:03
2021	20	09:37	21	03:32	22	19:21	21	15:59
2022	20	15:33	21	09:14	23	01:04	21	21:48
2023	20	21:25	21	14:58	23	06:50	22	03:28
2024	20	03:07	20	20:51	22	12:44	21	09:20
2025	20	09:01	21	02:42	22	18:19	21	15:03
2026	20	14:46	21	08:25	23	00:06	21	20:50
2027	20	20:25	21	14:11	23	06:02	22	02:43
2028	20	02:17	20	20:02	22	11:45	21	08:20
2029	20	08:01	21	01:48	22	17:37	21	14:14
2030	20	13:51	21	07:31	22	23:27	21	20:09
2031	20	19:41	21	13:17	23	05:15	22	01:56
2032	20	01:23	20	19:09	22	11:11	21	07:57
2033	20	07:23	21	01:01	22	16:52	21	13:45
2034	20	13:18	21	06:45	22	22:41	21	19:35
2035	20	19:03	21	12:33	23	04:39	22	01:31
2036	20	01:02	20	18:31	22	10:23	21	07:12

== Solar year ==
The December-solstice solar year is the solar year based on the December solstice. It is thus the length of time between adjacent December solstices.

The length of the December-solstice year has been relatively stable between 6000 BC and AD 2000, in the range of 49 minutes 30 seconds to 50 minutes in excess of 365 days 5 hours. This is longer than the mean year of the Gregorian calendar, which has an excess time of 49 minutes and 12 seconds. Since 2000, it has been growing shorter. In 4000, the excess time will be 48 minutes 52 seconds, and, in 10000, 46 minutes 45 seconds.

== The length of the day near the December solstice ==
The following tables contain information on the length of the day on 22 December, close to the winter solstice of the Northern Hemisphere and the summer solstice of the Southern Hemisphere (i.e. December solstice). The data was collected from the website of the Finnish Meteorological Institute on 22 December 2015, as well as from certain other websites.

The data is arranged geographically and within the tables from the shortest day to the longest one.

The Nordic countries, Russia, and the Baltic states
City	Sunrise 21 Dec 2022	Sunset 21 Dec 2022	Length of the day
(Russia) Murmansk	—	—	0 min
(Russia) Apatity	—	—	0 min
(Norway) Bodø	11:35	12:24	49 min
(Finland) Rovaniemi	11:07	13:22	2 h 15 min
(Sweden) Luleå	9:54	13:03	3 h 9 min
(Iceland) Reykjavík	11:21	15:29	4 h 8 min
(Norway) Trondheim	10:01	14:31	4 h 30 min
(Faroe Islands) Tórshavn	9:50	14:59	5 h 9 min
(Finland) Helsinki	9:23	15:12	5 h 49 min
(Norway) Oslo	9:17	15:11	5 h 54 min
(Estonia) Tallinn	9:17	15:20	6 h 3 min
(Sweden) Stockholm	8:43	14:47	6 h 4 min
(Latvia) Riga	8:59	15:43	6 h 44 min
(Denmark) Copenhagen	8:36	15:38	7 h 2 min
(Lithuania) Vilnius	8:39	15:53	7 h 14 min

Rest of Europe
City	Sunrise 22 Dec 2015	Sunset 22 Dec 2015	Length of the day
(Russia) Saint Petersburg	10:00	15:53	5 h 53 min
(United Kingdom) Edinburgh	8:42	15:40	6 h 57 min
(Russia) Moscow	8:57	15:58	7 h 00 min
(Germany) Berlin	8:15	15:54	7 h 39 min
(Poland) Warsaw	7:43	15:25	7 h 42 min
(United Kingdom) London	8:04	15:53	7 h 49 min
(Ukraine) Kyiv	7:56	15:56	8 h 00 min
(France) Paris	8:41	16:56	8 h 14 min
(Austria) Vienna	7:42	16:03	8 h 20 min
(Hungary) Budapest	7:28	15:55	8 h 26 min
(Italy) Rome	7:34	16:42	9 h 07 min
(Turkey) Istanbul	8:25	17:38	9 h 13 min
(Spain) Madrid	8:34	17:51	9 h 17 min
(Portugal) Lisbon	7:51	17:18	9 h 27 min
(Greece) Athens	7:37	17:09	9 h 31 min

Africa
City	Sunrise 22 Dec 2015	Sunset 22 Dec 2015	Length of the day
(Egypt) Cairo	6:47	16:59	10 h 12 min
(Spain) Tenerife	7:53	18:13	10 h 19 min
(Senegal) Dakar	7:30	18:46	11 h 15 min
(Ethiopia) Addis Ababa	6:35	18:11	11 h 36 min
(Kenya) Nairobi	6:25	18:37	12 h 11 min
(Democratic Republic of the Congo) Kinshasa	5:45	18:08	12 h 22 min
(Tanzania) Dar es Salaam	6:05	18:36	12 h 31 min
(Angola) Luanda	5:46	18:24	12 h 38 min
(Madagascar) Antananarivo	5:10	18:26	13 h 16 min
(Namibia) Windhoek	6:04	19:35	13 h 31 min
(South Africa) Johannesburg	5:12	18:59	13 h 47 min
(South Africa) Cape Town	5:32	19:57	14 h 25 min

Middle East
City	Sunrise 22 Dec 2015	Sunset 22 Dec 2015	Length of the day
(Iran) Tehran	7:10	16:55	9 h 44 min
(Lebanon) Beirut	6:39	16:33	9 h 54 min
(Iraq) Baghdad	7:02	16:59	9 h 57 min
(Israel) Jerusalem	6:35	16:39	10 h 04 min
(Bahrain) Manama	6:21	16:51	10 h 30 min
(Qatar) Doha	6:15	16:49	10 h 34 min
(United Arab Emirates) Dubai	7:00	17:34	10 h 34 min
(Saudi Arabia) Riyadh	6:32	17:10	10 h 37 min
(Oman) Muscat	6:43	17:23	10 h 41 min
(Yemen) Sanaa	6:25	17:38	11 h 13 min

Americas
City	Sunrise 22 Dec 2015	Sunset 22 Dec 2015	Length of the day
(Canada) Inuvik	—	—	0 h
(United States) Fairbanks	10:58	14:40	3 h 41 min
(Greenland) Nuuk	10:22	14:28	4 h 06 min
(United States) Anchorage	10:14	15:42	5 h 27 min
(Canada) Edmonton	8:48	16:15	7 h 27 min
(Canada) Vancouver	8:05	16:16	8 h 11 min
(United States) Seattle	7:55	16:20	8 h 25 min
(Canada) Ottawa	7:39	16:22	8 h 42 min
(Canada) Toronto	7:48	16:43	8 h 55 min
(United States) New York City	7:16	16:32	9 h 15 min
(United States) Washington, D.C.	7:23	16:49	9 h 26 min
(United States) Los Angeles	6:55	16:48	9 h 53 min
(United States) Dallas	7:25	17:25	9 h 59 min
(United States) Miami	7:03	17:35	10 h 31 min
(United States) Honolulu	7:04	17:55	10 h 50 min
Mexico City	7:06	18:03	10 h 57 min
(Nicaragua) Managua	6:01	17:26	11 h 24 min
(Colombia) Bogotá	5:59	17:50	11 h 51 min
(Ecuador) Quito	6:08	18:16	12 h 08 min
(Brazil) Recife	5:00	17:35	12 h 35 min
(Peru) Lima	5:41	18:31	12 h 50 min
(Bolivia) La Paz	5:57	19:04	13 h 06 min
(Brazil) Rio de Janeiro	6:04	19:37	13 h 33 min
(Brazil) São Paulo	6:17	19:52	13 h 35 min
(United States) Salt Lake City	7:48	17:03	9 h 14 min
(Brazil) Porto Alegre	6:20	20:25	14 h 05 min
(Chile) Santiago	6:29	20:52	14 h 22 min
(Argentina) Buenos Aires	5:37	20:06	14 h 28 min
(Argentina) Ushuaia	4:51	22:11	17 h 19 min

Asia-Pacific
City	Sunrise 22 Dec 2015	Sunset 22 Dec 2015	Length of the day
(Russia) Magadan	8:54	14:55	6 h 00 min
(Russia) Petropavlovsk	9:36	17:10	7 h 33 min
(Russia) Khabarovsk	8:48	17:07	8 h 18 min
(Mongolia) Ulaanbaatar	8:39	17:02	8 h 22 min
(Russia) Vladivostok	8:40	17:40	8 h 59 min
(China) Beijing	7:32	16:52	9 h 20 min
(South Korea) Seoul	7:44	17:17	9 h 34 min
(Japan) Tokyo	6:47	16:31	9 h 44 min
(China) Shanghai	6:48	16:55	10 h 07 min
(China) Lhasa	8:46	19:01	10 h 14 min
(India) Delhi	7:09	17:28	10 h 19 min
Hong Kong	6:58	17:44	10 h 46 min
(Philippines) Manila	6:16	17:32	11 h 15 min
(Thailand) Bangkok	6:36	17:55	11 h 19 min
Singapore	7:01	19:04	12 h 03 min
(Indonesia) Jakarta	5:36	18:05	12 h 28 min
(Indonesia) Denpasar	5:58	18:36	12 h 37 min
(Australia) Darwin	6:19	19:10	12 h 51 min
(French Polynesia) Papeete	5:21	18:32	13 h 10 min
(Australia) Brisbane	4:49	18:42	13 h 52 min
(Australia) Perth	5:07	19:22	14 h 14 min
(Australia) Sydney	5:41	20:05	14 h 24 min
(New Zealand) Auckland	5:58	20:39	14 h 41 min
(Australia) Melbourne	5:54	20:42	14 h 47 min
(New Zealand) Dunedin	5:43	21:28	15 h 44 min
(New Zealand) Invercargill	5:50	21:39	15 h 48 min

Length of day increases from the equator towards the South Pole in the Southern Hemisphere in December (around the summer solstice there), but decreases towards the North Pole in the Northern Hemisphere at the time of the northern winter solstice.

== See also ==
=== Astronomy ===
- March equinox
- June solstice
- September equinox

=== Holidays ===
- Christmas Eve
- Christmas
- Hanukkah
- Kwanzaa
- New Year's Day
- New Year's Eve
- Yalda Night
- Yule
