= September equinox =

When sun appears directly over equator

The September equinox (or southward equinox) is the moment when the Sun appears to cross the celestial equator, heading southward. Because of differences between the calendar year and the tropical year, the September equinox may occur from September 21 to 24.

Illumination of Earth by the Sun on the day of an equinox

At the equinox, the Sun as viewed from the equator rises due east and sets due west. Before the Southward equinox, the Sun rises and sets more northerly, and afterwards, it rises and sets more southerly.

The equinox may be taken to mark the end of astronomical summer and the beginning of astronomical autumn (autumnal equinox) in the Northern Hemisphere, while marking the end of astronomical winter and the start of astronomical spring (vernal equinox) in the Southern Hemisphere.

== Occurrences ==
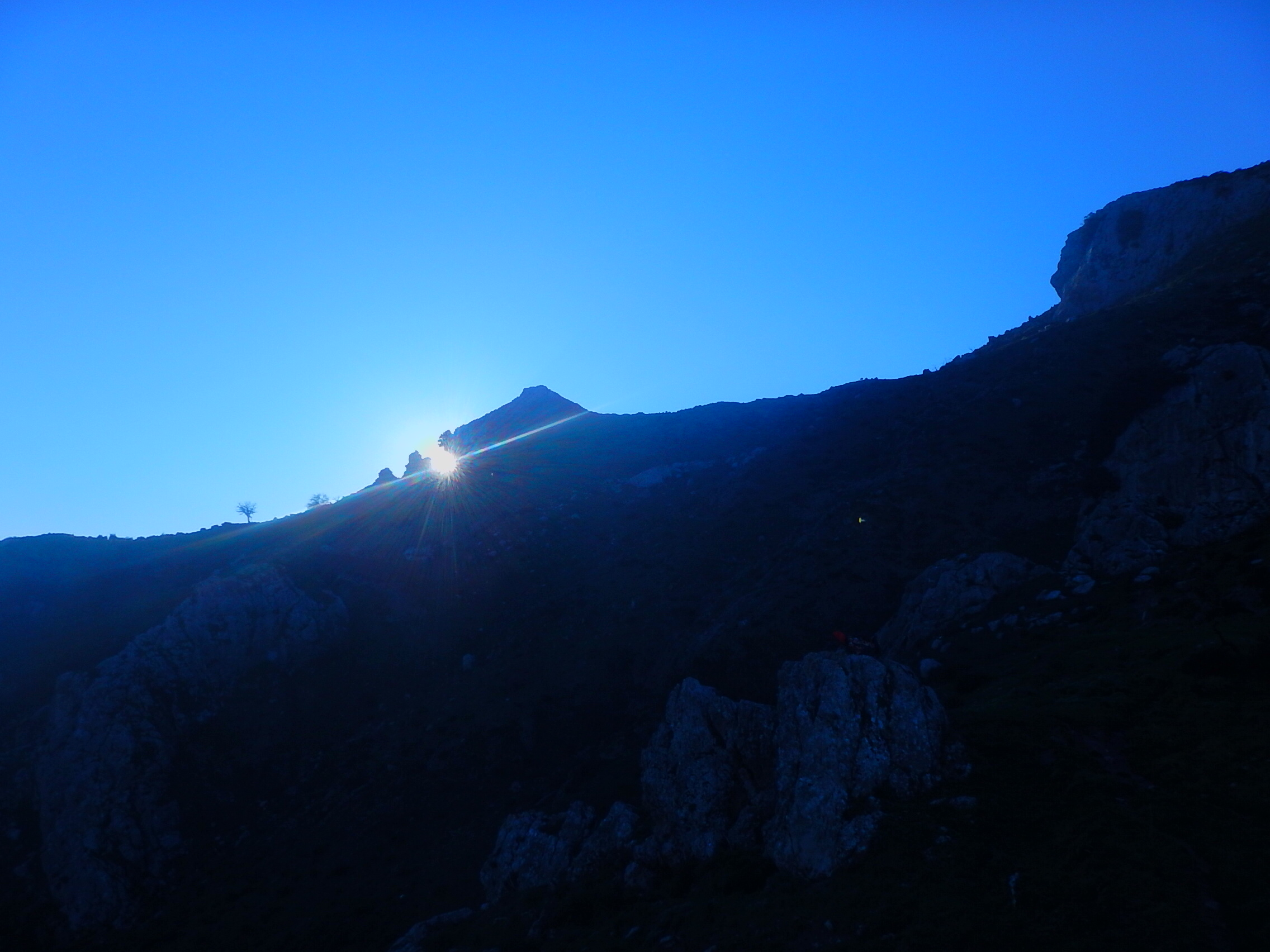
Sunset at the equinox from the site of Pizzo Vento at Fondachelli Fantina, Sicily

The September equinox is one point in time commonly used to determine the length of the tropical year.

UT date and time of equinoxes and solstices on Earth
event	equinox		solstice		equinox		solstice	
month	March		June		September		December	
year	day	time	day	time	day	time	day	time
2016	20	04:31	20	22:35	22	14:21	21	10:45
2017	20	10:29	21	04:25	22	20:02	21	16:29
2018	20	16:15	21	10:07	23	01:54	21	22:22
2019	20	21:58	21	15:54	23	07:50	22	04:19
2020	20	03:50	20	21:43	22	13:31	21	10:03
2021	20	09:37	21	03:32	22	19:21	21	15:59
2022	20	15:33	21	09:14	23	01:04	21	21:48
2023	20	21:25	21	14:58	23	06:50	22	03:28
2024	20	03:07	20	20:51	22	12:44	21	09:20
2025	20	09:01	21	02:42	22	18:19	21	15:03
2026	20	14:46	21	08:25	23	00:06	21	20:50
2027	20	20:25	21	14:11	23	06:02	22	02:43
2028	20	02:17	20	20:02	22	11:45	21	08:20
2029	20	08:01	21	01:48	22	17:37	21	14:14
2030	20	13:51	21	07:31	22	23:27	21	20:09
2031	20	19:41	21	13:17	23	05:15	22	01:56
2032	20	01:23	20	19:09	22	11:11	21	07:57
2033	20	07:23	21	01:01	22	16:52	21	13:45
2034	20	13:18	21	06:45	22	22:41	21	19:35
2035	20	19:03	21	12:33	23	04:39	22	01:31
2036	20	01:02	20	18:31	22	10:23	21	07:12

== Constellation ==
The point where the Sun crosses the celestial equator southwards is called the First Point of Libra. However, because of the precession of the equinoxes, this point is no longer in the constellation Libra, but rather in Virgo.

The solar point of the September equinox passed from Libra and into Virgo in −729 (730 BCE) and will enter Leo in 2439.

== Apparent movement of the Sun in relation to the horizon ==
At the equinox, the Sun rises directly in the east and sets directly in the west. However, because of refraction it will usually appear slightly above the horizon at the moment when its "true" middle is rising or setting. For viewers at the north or south poles, it moves virtually horizontally on or above the horizon, not obviously rising or setting apart from the movement in "declination" (and hence altitude) of a little under a half (0.39) degree per day.

For observers in either hemisphere not at the poles, the Sun rises and sets more and more to the south during the 3 months following the September equinox. This period is the second half of a 6-month long southerly movement, beginning with the June solstice when the Sun rises and sets at its most northern point.

== Culture ==
=== Calendars ===
The September equinox marked the first day of the French Republican Calendar.

=== Commemorations ===
==== West Asia ====
- The Southward equinox marks the first day of Mehr or Libra in the Iranian calendar. It is one of the Iranian festivals called Jashne Mehregan, or the festival of sharing or love in Zoroastrianism.

==== East Asia ====
- In Japan Autumnal Equinox Day (秋分の日, Shūbun no hi) is a public holiday. Higan (お彼岸) is a Buddhist holiday exclusively celebrated by Japanese sects during both the Spring and Autumnal Equinox.
- In Korea, Chuseok is a major harvest festival and a three-day holiday celebrated around the Autumn Equinox.
- The Mid-Autumn Festival is celebrated on the 15th day of the 8th lunar month, often near the autumnal equinox day. It is an official holiday in both the PRC and Taiwan. The day after Mid-Autumn Festival is an official holiday in both Hong Kong and Macao. Singapore has no official holiday connected to Mid-Autumn Festival. As the lunar calendar is not synchronous with the Gregorian calendar, this date could be anywhere from mid-September to early October.
- The traditional East Asian calendars divide a year into 24 solar terms (节气, literally "climatic segments"), and the autumnal equinox (Qiūfēn, Chinese and Japanese: 秋分; Korean: 추분; Vietnamese: Thu phân) marks the middle of the autumn season. In this context, the Chinese character 分 means "(equal) division" (within a season).

==== Judaism ====
- The Jewish Sukkot usually falls on the first full moon after the northern hemisphere autumnal equinox, although occasionally (In the modern Jewish calendar, three times every 19 years) it will occur on the second full moon.
- Rosh Hashanah falls on a new moon close to this equinox, although occasionally (In the modern Jewish calendar, three times every 19 years) it will occur on the second new moon.

==== Polynesia ====
- In Tahiti, this period or Rāhiti would have marked preparations for the festivities of the season of abundance (tau ʻauhune) marked by the rising of the Pleiades (Matariʻi i nia) later in November.

==== Europe ====
- Dożynki is a Slavic harvest festival. In pre-Christian times the feast usually fell on the autumn equinox.
- The Southward equinox was "New Year's Day" in the French Republican Calendar, which was in use from 1793 to 1805. The French First Republic was proclaimed and the French monarchy was abolished on September 21, 1792, making the following day (the equinox day that year) the first day of the "Republican Era" in France. The start of every year was to be determined by astronomical calculations following the real Sun and not the mean Sun.
- The traditional harvest festival in the United Kingdom was celebrated on the Sunday of the full moon closest to the September equinox.

==== Neopaganism ====
- Neopagans observe the September equinox, referred to in some traditions as Mabon, as a cardinal point on the Wheel of the Year. In the Northern Hemisphere some varieties of paganism adapt Autumn Equinox traditions. In the Southern Hemisphere, the vernal equinox corresponds with Ostara.

==== Americas ====
- The reconstructed Cahokia Woodhenge, a large timber circle located at the Mississippian culture Cahokia archaeological site near Collinsville, Illinois, is the site of annual equinox and solstice sunrise observances. An announcement for the 2017 observance said "Out of respect for Native American beliefs, no rituals or ceremonies will be held at the event. But visitors will stand in the same place where the Mississippian people once gathered to watch the sun rise."

== See also ==
- March equinox
- June solstice
- December solstice
