= June solstice =

Annual solstice between 20 and 22 June

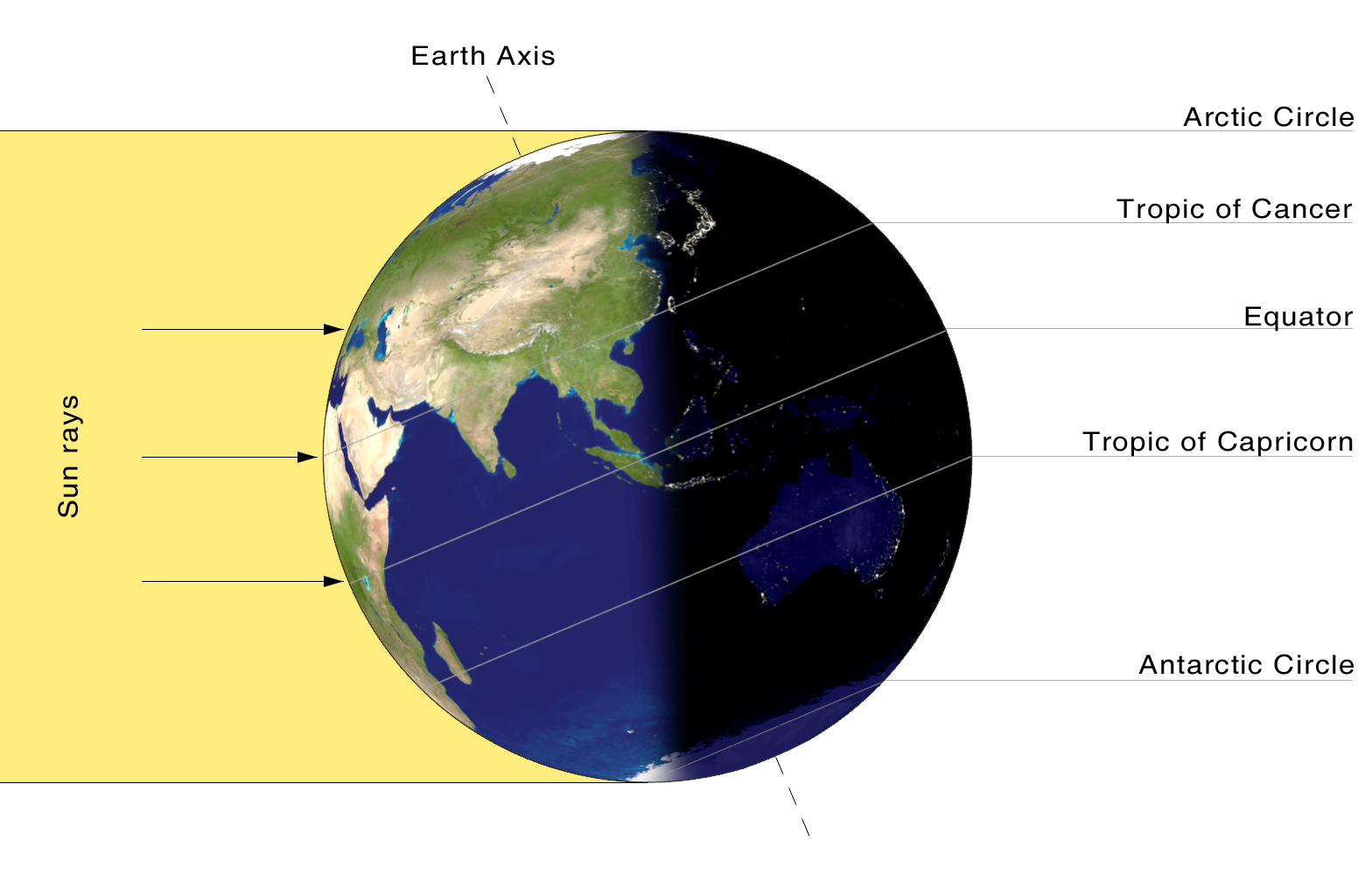
Illumination of Earth by the Sun on the day of the June solstice

UT date and time of equinoxes and solstices on Earth
event	equinox		solstice		equinox		solstice	
month	March		June		September		December	
year	day	time	day	time	day	time	day	time
2016	20	04:31	20	22:35	22	14:21	21	10:45
2017	20	10:29	21	04:25	22	20:02	21	16:29
2018	20	16:15	21	10:07	23	01:54	21	22:22
2019	20	21:58	21	15:54	23	07:50	22	04:19
2020	20	03:50	20	21:43	22	13:31	21	10:03
2021	20	09:37	21	03:32	22	19:21	21	15:59
2022	20	15:33	21	09:14	23	01:04	21	21:48
2023	20	21:25	21	14:58	23	06:50	22	03:28
2024	20	03:07	20	20:51	22	12:44	21	09:20
2025	20	09:01	21	02:42	22	18:19	21	15:03
2026	20	14:46	21	08:25	23	00:06	21	20:50
2027	20	20:25	21	14:11	23	06:02	22	02:43
2028	20	02:17	20	20:02	22	11:45	21	08:20
2029	20	08:01	21	01:48	22	17:37	21	14:14
2030	20	13:51	21	07:31	22	23:27	21	20:09
2031	20	19:41	21	13:17	23	05:15	22	01:56
2032	20	01:23	20	19:09	22	11:11	21	07:57
2033	20	07:23	21	01:01	22	16:52	21	13:45
2034	20	13:18	21	06:45	22	22:41	21	19:35
2035	20	19:03	21	12:33	23	04:39	22	01:31
2036	20	01:02	20	18:31	22	10:23	21	07:12

The June solstice, also known as the northern solstice, is the solstice on Earth that occurs annually between 20 and 22 June according to the Gregorian calendar. In the Northern Hemisphere, the June solstice is the summer solstice (the day with the longest period of daylight), while in the Southern Hemisphere it is the winter solstice (the day with the shortest period of daylight). During the June solstice, the Sun is directly over the Tropic of Cancer, located in the northern hemisphere.

== Solar year ==
The June solstice solar year is the solar year based on the June solstice. It is the length of time between adjacent June solstices.

== The length of the day on June solstice ==
The following tables contain information on the length of the day on 20 June 2016, close to the summer solstice of the Northern Hemisphere and winter solstice of the Southern Hemisphere. The data was collected from the website of the Finnish Meteorological Institute as well as from certain other websites.

The data is arranged geographically and within the tables from the longest day to the shortest one. Times that occur the next day (21 June) are marked with ^{+}.

Fennoscandia and the Baltic states
City	Sunrise 20 June 2016	Sunset 20 June 2016	Length of the day
(Russia) Murmansk	—	—	24 h
(Russia) Apatity	—	—	24 h
(Norway) Bodø	—	—	24 h
(Finland) Rovaniemi	—	—	24 h
(Sweden) Luleå	1:00	0:05^{+}	23 h 04 min
(Russia) Arkhangelsk	1:34	23:04	21 h 30 min
(Iceland) Reykjavík	2:55	0:03^{+}	21 h 08 min
(Norway) Trondheim	3:02	23:37	20 h 35 min
(Faroe Islands) Tórshavn	3:36	23:21	19 h 45 min
(Russia) Petrozavodsk	2:55	22:33	19 h 38 min
(Finland) Helsinki	3:54	22:49	18 h 55 min
(Russia) Saint Petersburg	3:35	22:25	18 h 50 min
(Norway) Oslo	3:53	22:43	18 h 49 min
(Estonia) Tallinn	4:03	22:42	18 h 39 min
(Sweden) Stockholm	3:30	22:07	18 h 37 min
(Latvia) Riga	4:29	22:21	17 h 52 min
(Denmark) Copenhagen	4:25	21:57	17 h 32 min
(Lithuania) Vilnius	4:41	21:59	17 h 17 min

Rest of Europe
City	Sunrise 20 June 2016	Sunset 20 June 2016	Length of the day
(Scotland) Edinburgh	4:26	22:02	17 h 36 min
(Russia) Moscow	3:44	21:17	17 h 33 min
(Republic of Ireland) Dublin	4:56	21:56	17 h 00 min
(Germany) Berlin	4:43	21:33	16 h 49 min
(Poland) Warsaw	4:14	21:00	16 h 46 min
(United Kingdom) London	4:43	21:21	16 h 38 min
(Ukraine) Kyiv	4:46	21:12	16 h 26 min
(France) Paris	5:46	21:57	16 h 10 min
(Austria) Vienna	4:53	20:58	16 h 04 min
(Hungary) Budapest	4:46	20:44	15 h 58 min
(Switzerland) Zürich	5:29	21:25	15 h 56 min
(Italy) Rome	5:34	20:48	15 h 13 min
(Spain) Madrid	6:44	21:48	15 h 03 min
(Portugal) Lisbon	6:11	21:04	14 h 52 min
(Greece) Athens	6:02	20:50	14 h 48 min

Africa
City	Sunrise 20 June 2016	Sunset 20 June 2016	Length of the day
(Egypt) Cairo	4:54	18:59	14 h 04 min
(Spain) Tenerife	7:08	21:05	13 h 57 min
(Senegal) Dakar	6:41	19:41	12 h 59 min
(Ethiopia) Addis Ababa	6:07	18:46	12 h 38 min
(Kenya) Nairobi	6:32	18:35	12 h 02 min
(Democratic Republic of the Congo) Kinshasa	6:04	17:56	11 h 52 min
(Tanzania) Dar es Salaam	6:32	18:16	11 h 43 min
(Angola) Luanda	6:20	17:56	11 h 36 min
(Saint Helena) Jamestown	6:49	17:59	11 h 10 min
(Madagascar) Antananarivo	6:21	17:21	10 h 59 min
(Namibia) Windhoek	6:30	17:15	10 h 44 min
(South Africa) Johannesburg	6:54	17:24	10 h 29 min
(South Africa) Cape Town	7:51	17:44	9 h 53 min

Middle East
City	Sunrise 20 June 2016	Sunset 20 June 2016	Length of the day
(Iran) Tehran	5:48	20:23	14 h 34 min
(Lebanon) Beirut	5:27	19:52	14 h 24 min
(Iraq) Baghdad	4:53	19:14	14 h 21 min
(Israel) Jerusalem	5:33	19:47	14 h 13 min
(Bahrain) Manama	4:45	18:32	13 h 46 min
(Qatar) Doha	4:44	18:26	13 h 42 min
(United Arab Emirates) Dubai	5:29	19:11	13 h 42 min
(Saudi Arabia) Riyadh	5:04	18:44	13 h 39 min
(Oman) Muscat	5:19	18:55	13 h 35 min
(Yemen) Sanaa	5:33	18:35	13 h 02 min

Americas
City	Sunrise 20 June 2016	Sunset 20 June 2016	Length of the day
(Canada) Inuvik	—	—	24 h
(United States) Fairbanks	2:57	0:47^{+}	21 h 49 min
(Greenland) Nuuk	2:53	0:03^{+}	21 h 09 min
(Canada) Iqaluit	2:11	23:00	20 h 49 min
(United States) Anchorage	4:20	23:41	19 h 21 min
(United States) Kodiak	5:07	23:14	18 h 06 min
(United States) Sitka	4:06	22:00	17 h 54 min
(United States) Unalaska	6:34	23:41	17 h 06 min
(Canada) Edmonton	5:04	22:07	17 h 02 min
(Canada) Winnipeg	5:19	21:40	16 h 21 min
(Canada) Vancouver	5:06	21:21	16 h 14 min
(United States) Seattle	5:11	21:10	15 h 59 min
(Canada) Ottawa	5:14	20:54	15 h 40 min
(Canada) Toronto	5:35	21:02	15 h 26 min
(United States) New York	5:24	20:30	15 h 05 min
(United States) Washington	5:42	20:36	14 h 53 min
(United States) Los Angeles	5:42	20:07	14 h 25 min
(United States) Miami	6:30	20:14	13 h 44 min
(Cuba) Havana	6:44	20:17	13 h 33 min
(United States) Honolulu	5:50	19:16	13 h 25 min
Mexico City	6:59	20:17	13 h 18 min
(Jamaica) Kingston	5:32	18:45	13 h 13 min
(Barbados) Bridgetown	5:33	18:27	12 h 54 min
(Nicaragua) Managua	5:21	18:11	12 h 50 min
(Trinidad and Tobago) Port of Spain	5:45	18:30	12 h 45 min
(Guyana) Georgetown	5:38	18:09	12 h 31 min
(Colombia) Bogotá	5:46	18:09	12 h 23 min
(Ecuador) Quito	6:12	18:19	12 h 06 min
(Peru) Lima	6:27	17:52	11 h 24 min
(Bolivia) La Paz	6:59	18:08	11 h 08 min
(Brazil) Rio de Janeiro	6:32	17:16	10 h 43 min
(Brazil) São Paulo	6:47	17:28	10 h 40 min
(Brazil) Porto Alegre	7:20	17:32	10 h 12 min
(Chile) Santiago	7:46	17:42	9 h 56 min
(Argentina) Buenos Aires	8:00	17:50	9 h 49 min
(Argentina) Ushuaia	9:58	17:11	7 h 12 min

Asia and Oceania
City	Sunrise 20 June 2016	Sunset 20 June 2016	Length of the day
(Russia) Provideniya	0:52	22:16	21 h 23 min
(Russia) Magadan	3:37	22:19	18 h 41 min
(Russia) Petropavlovsk	4:58	21:55	16 h 56 min
(Russia) Khabarovsk	4:57	21:04	16 h 07 min
(Mongolia) Ulaanbaatar	5:52	21:54	16 h 01 min
(Russia) Vladivostok	5:32	20:55	15 h 22 min
(China) Beijing	4:45	19:46	15 h 00 min
(South Korea) Seoul	5:11	19:56	14 h 46 min
(Japan) Tokyo	4:25	19:00	14 h 34 min
(China) Shanghai	4:50	19:01	14 h 10 min
(China) Lhasa	6:55	20:58	14 h 03 min
(India) Delhi	5:23	19:21	13 h 58 min
(Nepal) Kathmandu	5:08	19:02	13 h 53 min
(Taiwan) Taipei	5:04	18:46	13 h 41 min
Hong Kong	5:39	19:09	13 h 30 min
(Philippines) Manila	5:27	18:27	12 h 59 min
(Thailand) Bangkok	5:51	18:47	12 h 56 min
Singapore	7:00	19:12	12 h 11 min
(Indonesia) Jakarta	6:01	17:47	11 h 45 min
(Australia) Darwin	7:06	18:29	11 h 23 min
(French Polynesia) Papeete	6:27	17:32	11 h 04 min
(Australia) Sydney	6:59	16:53	9 h 53 min
(New Zealand) Auckland	7:33	17:11	9 h 37 min
(Australia) Melbourne	7:35	17:07	9 h 32 min
(New Zealand) Dunedin	8:19	16:59	8 h 39 min

The length of day increases from the equator towards the North Pole in the Northern Hemisphere in June (around the summer solstice there), but decreases towards the South Pole in the Southern Hemisphere at the time of the southern winter solstice.

== See also ==
=== Astronomy ===
- March equinox
- September equinox
- December solstice

=== Holidays ===
- Father's Day
- Inti Raymi
- Juneteenth
- Kupala Night
- Midnight sun
- Midsummer
- We Tripantu
- World Humanist Day
