= Middle latitudes =

Spatial region on Earth

World map with the middle latitudes highlighted in red

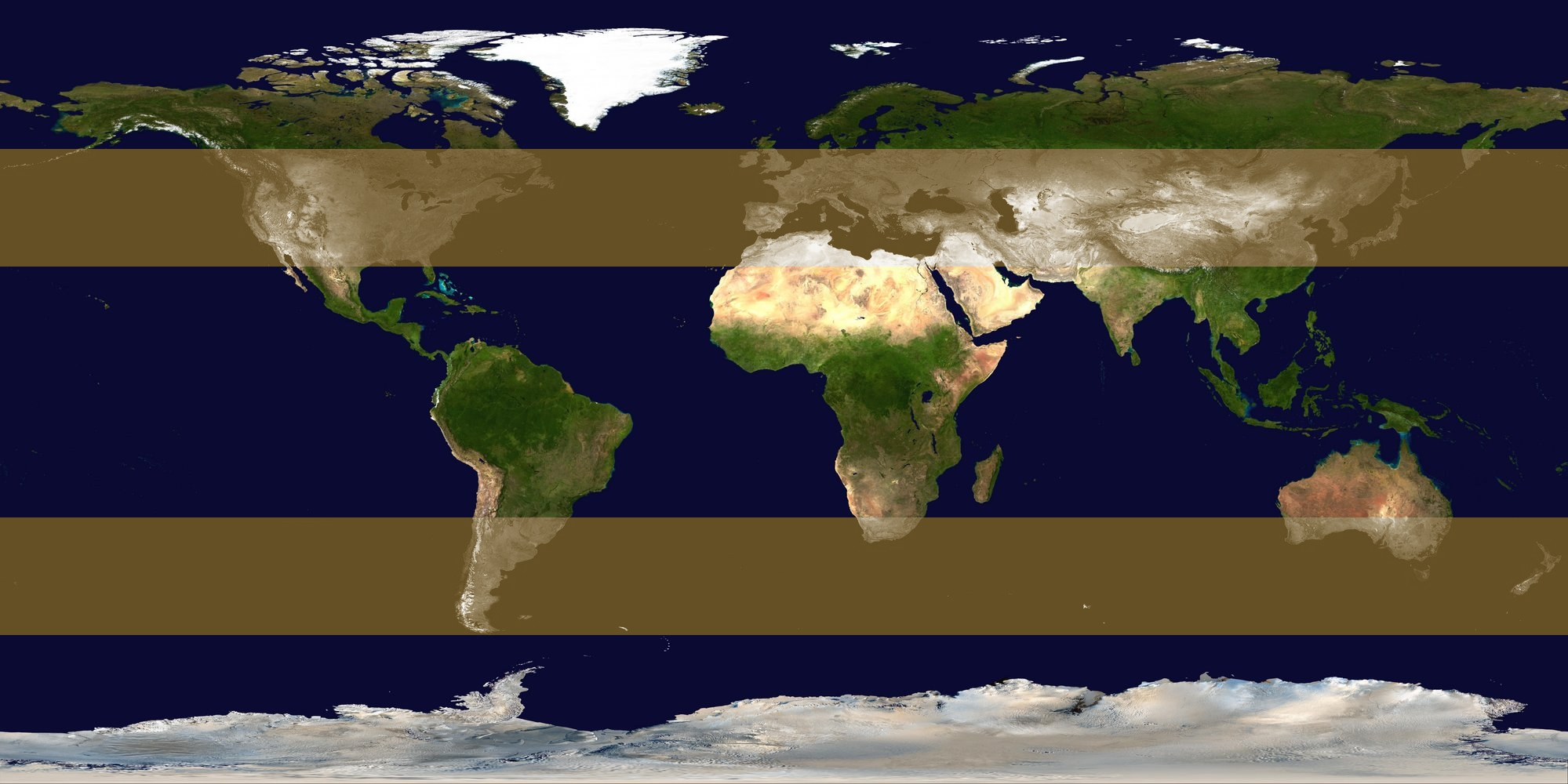
Extratropical cyclone formation areas

The middle latitudes, also called the mid-latitudes (sometimes spelled midlatitudes) or moderate latitudes, are spatial regions on either hemisphere of Earth, located between the Tropic of Cancer (latitude 23°26′09.1″) and the Arctic Circle (66°33′50.9″) in the Northern Hemisphere and between the Tropic of Capricorn (-23°26′09.1″) and the Antarctic Circle (-66°33′50.9″) in the Southern Hemisphere. They include Earth's subtropical and temperate zones, which lie between the two tropics and the polar circles. Weather fronts and extratropical cyclones are usually found in this area, as well as occasional tropical cyclones or subtropical cyclones, which have traveled from their areas of formation closer to the Equator.

The prevailing winds in the middle latitudes are often very strong. These parts of the world also see a wide variety of fast-changing weather as cold air masses from the poles and warm air masses from the tropics constantly push up and down over them against each other, sometimes alternating within hours of each other, especially in the Roaring Forties (latitudes between 40° and 50° in both hemispheres), even though the winds on the Northern Hemisphere are not as strong as in the Southern Hemisphere, due to the large landmasses of North America, Europe and Asia.

There are six types of mid-latitude climates consisting of: mediterranean, desert, humid subtropical, oceanic, humid continental and subarctic.

== See also ==
- Temperate climate
- Geographical zone
- Polar circle
- Subarctic climate
- Subtropics
- Tropics
