= Temperate climate =

Main climate class

A Köppen–Geiger climate map showing temperate climates for 1991–2020

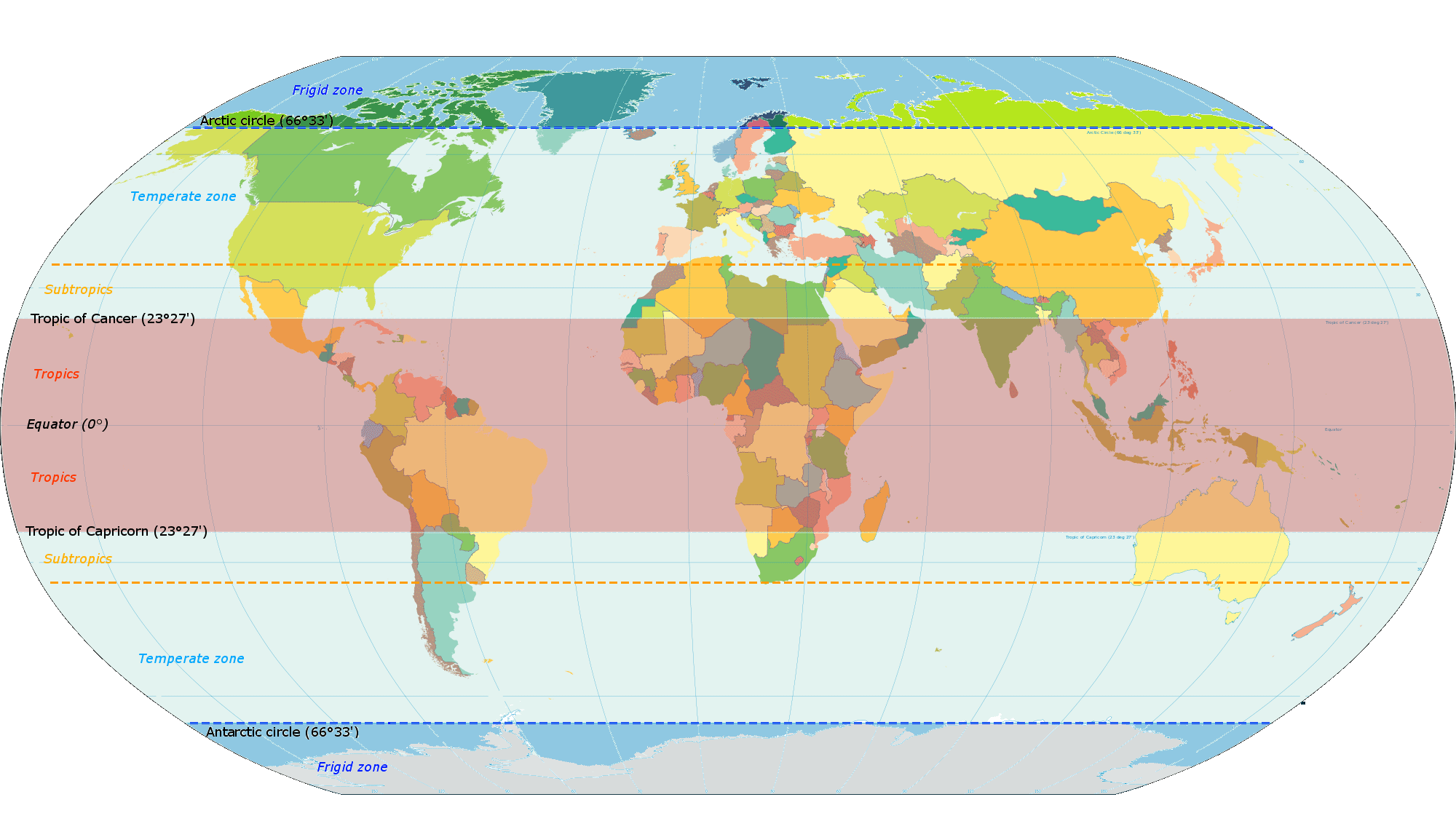
The different geographical zones of the world. The temperate zones, in the sense of geographical regions defined by latitude, span from either north or south of the tropics (north or south of the red strip) to the polar circles.

In geography, the temperate climates of Earth occur in the middle latitudes (approximately 23.5° to 66.5° N/S of the Equator), which span between the tropics and the polar regions of Earth. These zones generally have wider temperature ranges throughout the year and more distinct seasonal changes compared to tropical climates, where such variations are often small; they usually differ only in the amount of precipitation.

In temperate climates, not only do latitudinal positions influence temperature changes, but various sea currents, prevailing wind direction, continentality (how large a landmass is) and altitude also shape temperate climates.

The Köppen climate classification defines a climate as "temperate" C, when the mean temperature is above −3 °C (26.6 °F) but below 18 °C (64.4 °F) in the coldest month to account for the persistence of frost. However, some adaptations of Köppen set the minimum at 0 °C (32.0 °F). The broader definition of temperate climates may include continental climates, classified as D and having more extreme temperatures, with mean temperatures in the coldest month usually being below −3 °C (26.6 °F).

== Zones and climates ==
The north temperate zone extends from the Tropic of Cancer (approximately 23.5° north latitude) to the Arctic Circle (approximately 66.5° north latitude). The south temperate zone extends from the Tropic of Capricorn (approximately 23.5° south latitude) to the Antarctic Circle (at approximately 66.5° south latitude).

In some climate classifications, the temperate zone may be divided into several smaller climate zones, based on monthly temperatures, the coldest month, and rainfall. These can include the subtropical zone (humid subtropical and Mediterranean climate), and the cool temperate zone (oceanic and continental climates).

=== Subtropical zone ===
These climates are typically found in the more equatorial regions of the temperate zone, between 23.5° and 35° north or south not east or west. They are influenced more by the tropics than by other temperate climate types, usually experiencing warmer temperatures throughout the year, with longer and hotter summers and shorter, milder winters. Freezing precipitation is uncommon in this part of the temperate zone.

==== Humid subtropical (Cfa) and monsoon subtropical (Cwa) climates ====
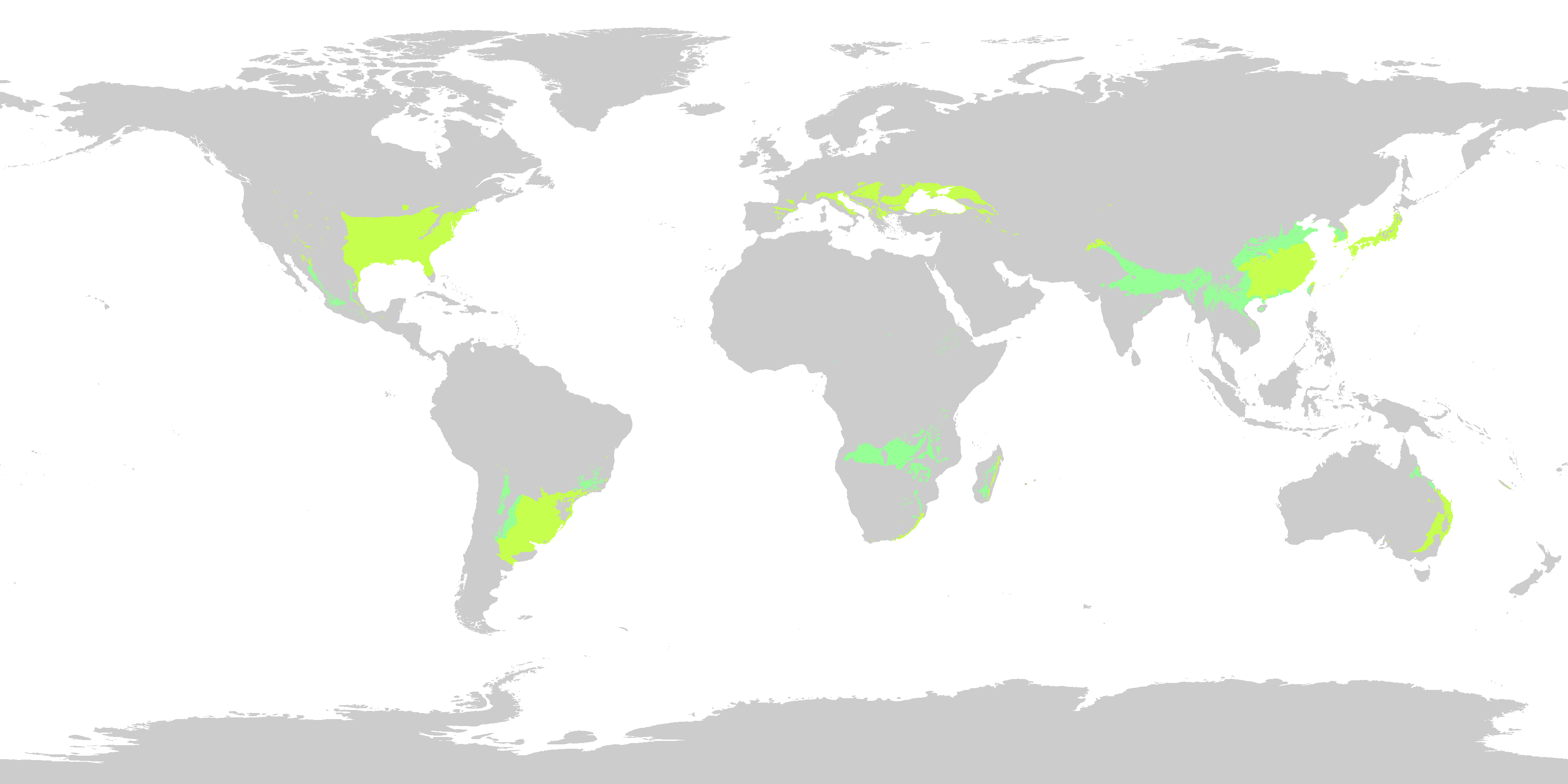
Regions where the humid (Cfa) and dry-winter subtropical (Cwa) climates are found as of 1991–2020, using a threshold of −3 °C (27 °F) for the coldest month Humid subtropical climate (Cfa) Monsoon-influenced humid subtropical climate (Cwa)

Humid subtropical climates generally have long, hot and humid summers with frequent convective showers in summer, and a peak seasonal rainfall in the hottest months. Winters are normally mild and above freezing in the humid subtropics. Warm ocean currents are usually found in coastal areas with humid subtropical climates. This type of climate is normally located along leeward lower east coasts of continents such as in the Pampas region of South America, Northern Vietnam, the southeast portions of East Asia, southern and portions of the northeast and midwestern United States and portions of, South Africa, Ethiopia, and eastern Australia. In some areas with a humid subtropical climate (most notably southeast China and North India), there is an even sharper wet-dry season, called a monsoon subtropical climate or subtropical monsoon (Cwa). In these regions, winters are quite chilly and dry and summers have very heavy rainfall. Some Cwa areas in southern China report more than 80% of annual precipitation in the five warmest months (southwest monsoon).

==== Mediterranean climates (Csa, Csb) ====
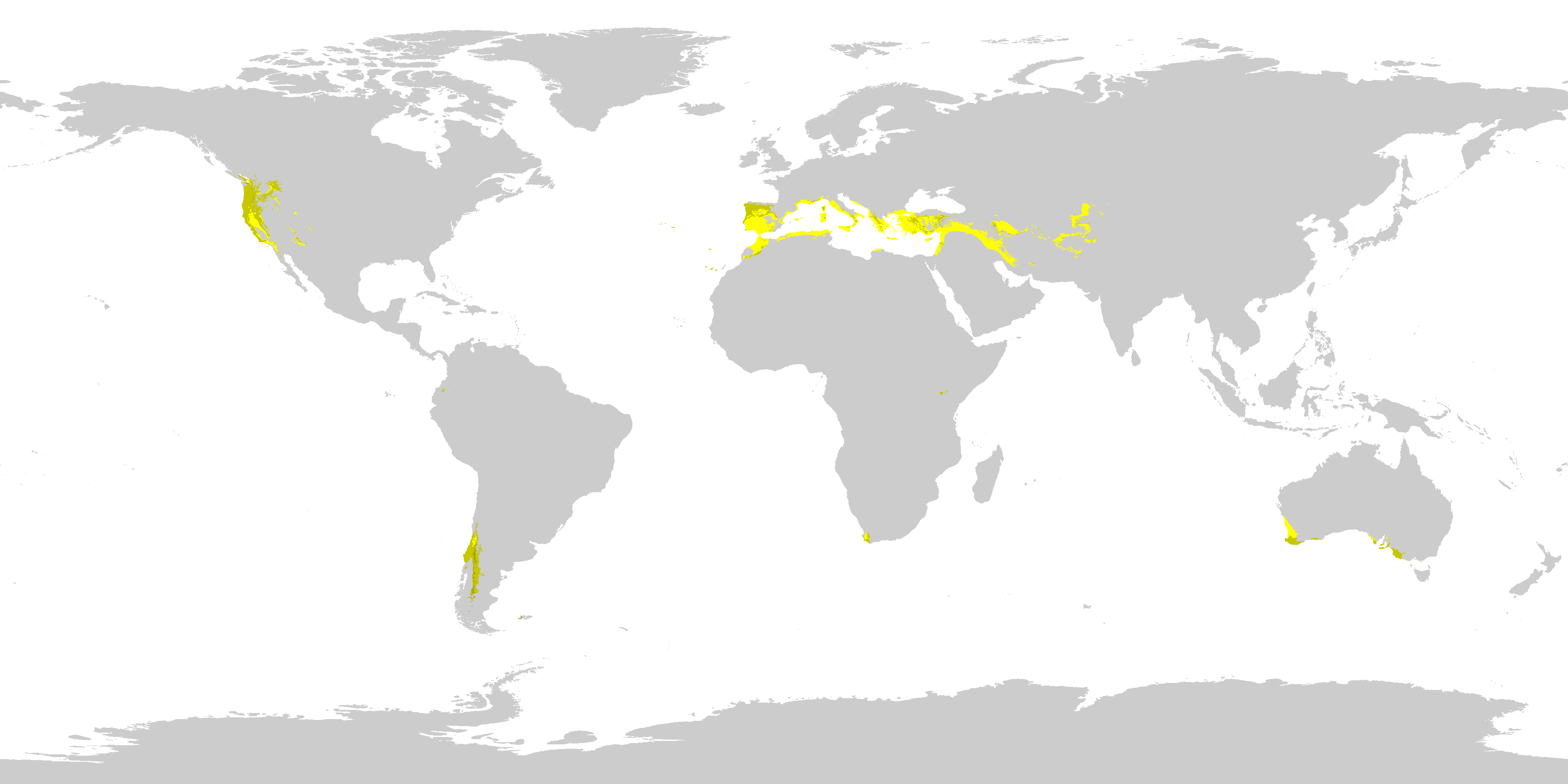
Regions where the dry-summer subtropical or Mediterranean climates (Csa, Csb) are found as of 1991–2020, using the −3 °C (27 °F) threshold for the coldest month. Csa Csb Csc

Mediterranean climates have the opposite rainfall pattern to dry-winter climates, with a dry summer and wet winter. This climate occurs mostly at the western edges and coasts of the continents and are bounded by arid deserts on their equatorward sides that brings dry winds causing the dry season of summer, and oceanic climates to the poleward sides that are influenced by cool ocean currents and air masses that bring the rainfall of winter. The five main Mediterranean regions of the world are the Mediterranean basin in North Africa, Southern Europe, and West Asia, coastal California in the United States, the South and West states of Australia, the Western Cape of South Africa, and central Chile.

==== Subtropical highland climates (Cwb, Cfb) ====
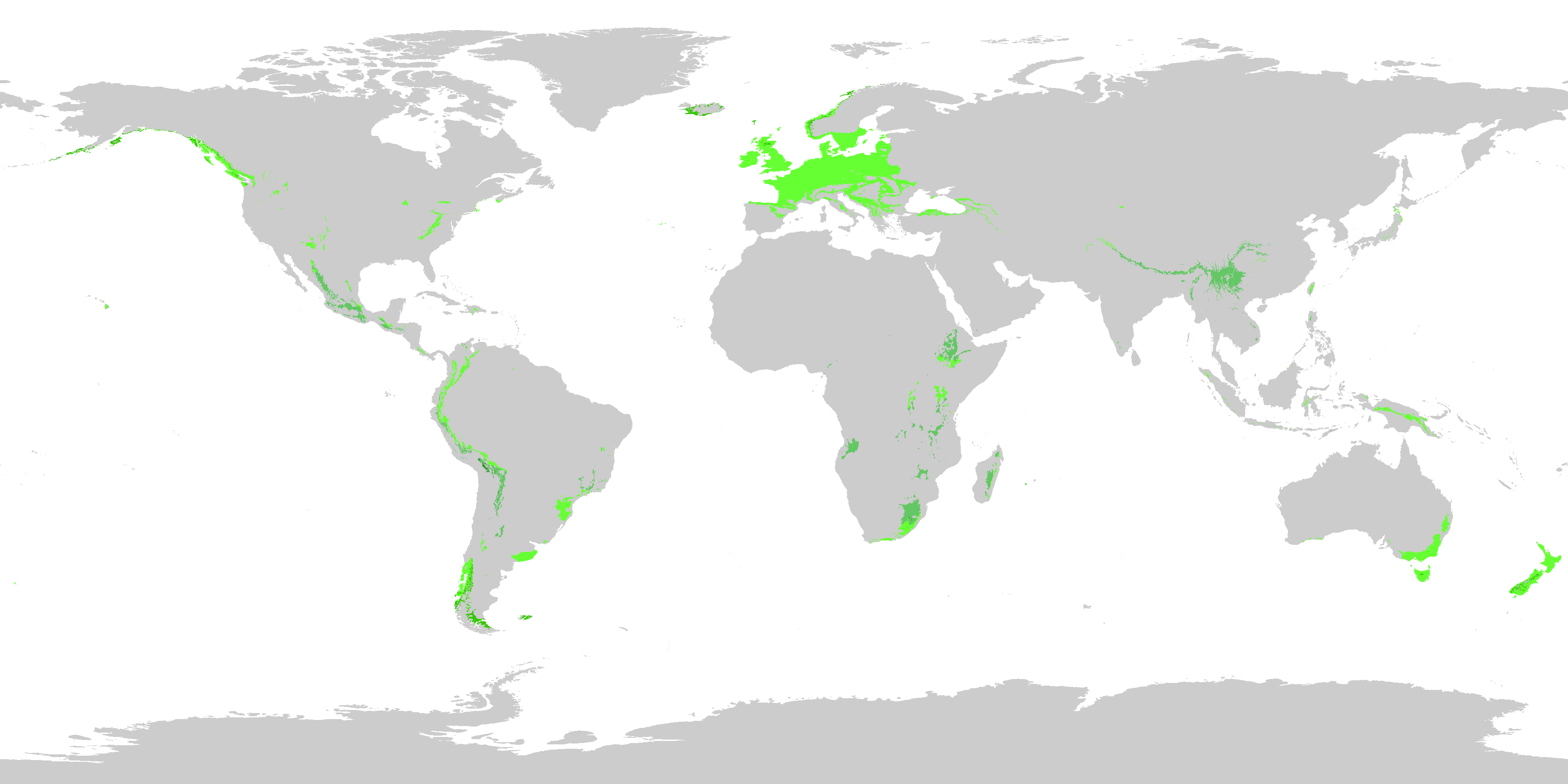
Regions where oceanic or subtropical highland climates (Cfb, Cfc, Cwb, Cwc) are found as of 1991–2020, using the −3 °C (27 °F) threshold for the coldest month.: Cfb; Cfc; Cwb; Cwc

Subtropical highland climates are climate variants often grouped together with oceanic climates found in some mountainous areas of either the tropics or subtropics. They have characteristically mild temperatures year-round, featuring the four seasons in the subtropics and no marked seasons in the tropics, the latter usually remaining mild to cool through most of the year. Subtropical highland climates under the Cfb classification usually have rainfall spread relatively evenly in all months of the year similar to most oceanic climates while climates under the Cwb classification have significant monsoon influence, usually having dry winters and wet summers.

=== Middle latitude zone ===
These climates occur in the middle latitudes, between approximately 35° and 66.5° north and south of the equator. There is an equal climatic influence from both the polar and tropical zones in this climate region. Two types of climates are in this zone, a milder oceanic one and more severe seasonal continental one. Most prototypical temperate climates have a distinct four-season pattern, especially in the continental climate sector.

==== Oceanic climates (Cfb) ====
Oceanic climates are created by the on-shore flow from the cool high latitude oceans to their west. This causes the climate to have mild summers and cool (but not cold) winters, and relative humidity and precipitation evenly distributed throughout the year. These climates are frequently cloudy and cool, and winters are milder than those in the continental climate.

Regions with oceanic climates include northwestern Europe, northwestern North America, southeastern and southwestern South America, southeastern Australia and most of New Zealand.

==== Humid continental climates (Dfa, Dfb, Dwa, Dwb, Dsa, Dsb) ====
Humid continental climates are sometimes included in the broader definition of temperate climates due to lying in the temperate zones, although they are classified separately from other temperate climates in the Köppen climate classification. In contrast to oceanic climates, they are created by large land masses and seasonal changes in wind direction. This causes humid continental climates to have severe temperatures for the season compared to other temperate climates, meaning a hot summer and cold winter. Precipitation may be evenly distributed throughout the year, while in some locations there is a summer accent on rainfall.

Regions with humid continental climates include southeastern Canada, the upper portions of the eastern United States, portions of eastern Europe, parts of China, Japan and the Korean Peninsula.

=== Subpolar zone ===
Subpolar zones are temperate climates that compared to the subtropics are on the poleward edge of the temperate zone. Therefore, they still have four marked seasons including a warmer one, but are far more influenced by the polar zones than any other but the very polar climates (tundra and ice cap climate).

==== Subpolar oceanic and cold subtropical highland climates (Cfc, Cwc) ====
Areas with subpolar oceanic climates feature an oceanic climate but are usually located closer to polar regions. As a result of their location, these regions tend to be on the cool end of oceanic climates. Snowfall tends to be more common here than in other oceanic climates. Subpolar oceanic climates are less prone to temperature extremes than subarctic climates or continental climates, featuring milder winters than these climates but still with similar summers. This variant of an oceanic climate is found in parts of coastal Iceland, the Faroe Islands, parts of Scotland, northwestern coastal areas of Norway such as Lofoten and reaching to 70° north on some islands, uplands near the coast of southwestern Norway, the Aleutian Islands of Alaska and northern parts of the Alaskan Panhandle, some parts of Southern Argentina and Chile (though most regions are still classified as continental subantarctic), and a few highland areas of Tasmania, the Australian Alps and Southern Alps of New Zealand. This type of climate is even found in tropical areas such as the Papuan Highlands in Indonesia. Cfc is the categorization for this regime. Even in the middle of summer, temperatures exceeding 20°C (68 °F) are exceptional weather events in the most maritime of those locations impacted by this regime. In some parts of this climate, temperatures as high as 30°C (86°F) have been recorded on rare occasions, while temperatures as low as −15 °C (5 °F) have still been recorded on rare occasions.

A cold variant of the monsoon-influenced subtropical highland climate similar to subpolar oceanic climates occurs in small areas in the Chinese provinces of Sichuan and Yunnan, and parts of the Altiplano between Bolivia, Peru and Chile, where summers are sufficiently short to be Cwc with fewer than four months over 10 °C (50 °F) due to the high altitudes at these locations. El Alto, Bolivia is one of the few confirmed cities that features this variation of a cold subtropical highland climate.

==== Cold summer mediterranean climates (Csc) ====
Cold summer mediterranean climates (Csc) are present in high-elevation areas around coastal Csb climate areas, where the strong maritime influence prevents the average winter monthly temperature from dropping below 0 °C. Despite the maritime influence, they are classified alongside other mediterranean climates in the Köppen classification rather than oceanic climates like subtropical highland climates due to the opposite rainfall pattern. This climate is rare and is predominantly found in climate fringes and isolated areas of the Cascades and Andes Mountains, as the dry-summer climate extends further poleward in the Americas than elsewhere.

== Human aspects ==
=== Demography, fauna and flora ===
The vast majority of the world's human population resides in temperate zones, especially in the Northern Hemisphere, due to its greater mass of land and lack of extreme temperatures. The biggest described number of taxa in a temperate region is found in southern Africa, where some 24,000 taxa (species and infraspecific taxa) have been described.

=== Agriculture ===
Farming, the active process of agricultural activities, is a large-scale practice in the temperate regions (except for boreal/subarctic regions) due to the plentiful rainfall and warm summers. Because most agricultural activity occurs in the spring and summer, cold winters have a small effect on agricultural production. Extreme winters or summers have a huge impact on the productivity of agriculture which is less common.

=== Urbanization ===
Temperate regions have the majority of the world's population, which leads to large cities. There are a couple of factors why the climate of large city landscapes differs from the climate of rural areas. One factor is the strength of the absorption rate of buildings and asphalt, which is higher than that of natural land. The other large factor is the burning of fossil fuels from buildings and vehicles. These factors have led to the average climate of cities to be warmer than surrounding areas.

== See also ==
- Geographical zone
- Habitat
- Köppen climate classification
- Middle latitudes
- Polar circle
- Subtropics
- Tropics
- Subarctic
- Highland temperate climate
- Humid temperate climate
- Subhumid temperate climate
