= Volcanic impacts on the oceans =

Effects of volcanic eruptions on the marine ecosystems and climate

Explosive volcanic eruptions affect the global climate in several ways.

== Lowering sea surface temperature ==
One main impact of volcanoes is the injection of sulfur-bearing gases into the stratosphere, which oxidize to form sulfate aerosols. Stratospheric sulfur aerosols spread around the globe by the atmospheric circulation, producing surface cooling by scattering solar radiation back to space. This cooling effect on the ocean surface usually lasts for several years as the lifetime of sulfate aerosols is about 2–3 years. However, in the subsurface ocean the cooling signal may persist for a longer time and may have impacts on some decadal variabilities, such as the Atlantic meridional overturning circulation (AMOC).

Volcanic aerosols from huge volcanoes (VEI>=5) directly reduce global mean sea surface temperature (SST) by approximately 0.2-0.3 °C, milder than global total surface temperature drop, which is ~0.3 to 0.5 °C, according to both global temperature records and model simulations. It usually takes several years to be back to normal.

== Decreasing ocean heat content ==

The volcanic cooling signals in ocean heat content can persist for much longer times (decadal or multi-decadal time scale), far beyond the duration of volcanic forcing.

Several studies have revealed that Krakatau’s effect in the heat content can be as long as one-century. Relaxation time of the effects of recent volcanoes is generally shorter than those before the 1950s. For example, the recovery time of ocean heat content of Pinatubo, which caused comparable radiative forcing to Krakatau, seems to be much shorter. This is because Pinatubo happened under a warm and non-stationary background with increasing greenhouse gas forcing. However, its signal still could penetrate down to ~1000 m deep.

A 2022 study on environmental impacts of volcanic eruptions showed that in the eastern equatorial of the pacific, after the volcano erupts, some low-latitude volcano trends to warmer. But some highlatitude volcanoes tend to be colder.

== Altering sea level ==
As thermal expansion is a key factor in sea level variability, decreased heat content should result in a reduction in global mean sea level on a decadal time scale. However, Grinsted [2007] argued that a significant sea level rise is the first direct response to the volcanic eruption, and after that sea level becomes to drop. One possible explanation for this phenomenon is the imbalance of ocean mass fluxes. After a volcanic eruption, evaporation over ocean will lower, because it is largely determined by the ocean surface temperature change. The quick response of evaporation to the surface cooling and the delayed response of river runoff to the associated lower precipitation lead to an increased sea level. About 1~2 years later, river discharge becomes less due to the reduced precipitation and less sea ice melting, which cause sea level to drop.

== Ocean oxygen and carbon levels ==
In 2023, several scientists studied the eruption of Mt Pinatubo in June 1991 and discovered that it led to increases in the ocean oxygen and carbon concentrations that persisted for many years.

== Enhancing AMOC ==
Results from a number of modeling studies suggest that the Atlantic Meridional Overturning Circulation (AMOC) is enhanced by volcanic activity. The deepwater formation at the northern end of the Atlantic Ocean allows SST anomalies to be subducted into the deep ocean efficiently because the rate of overturning is altered by changes in salinity. The decreasing summer-time ice melting and precipitation due to the volcano cooling enhance the salinity near the Greenland Sea, and further reduces static stability, which means more surface water sinks into the deep ocean. The studies of Stenchikov et al. (2009) and Iwi (2012) suggest that both Krakatau and Pinatubo may have strengthened the overturning circulation. And the increase in AMOC seems to be strongest at about one decade after the volcanic eruption, with a magnitude of about one sverdrup for Krakatau and Pinatubo.
