= Climograph =

Graphical representation of a location's climate

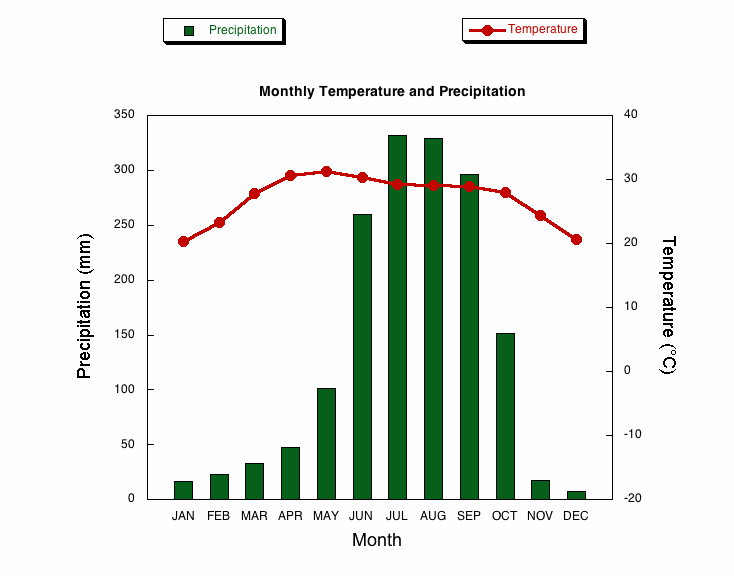
Climograph of Calcutta.

A climograph is a graphical representation of a location's basic climate. Climographs display data for two variables:

1. monthly average temperature
2. monthly average precipitation.

These are useful tools to quickly describe a location's climate.

== Representation ==
Tucson, AZ

Climate chart (precipitation, max. and min. temperature)
J	F	M	A	M	J	J	A	S	O	N	D
0.9 64 39	0.7 68 41	0.7 73 45	0.3 81 50	0.2 90 58	0.2 100 68	2.4 99 74	2.2 97 72	1.7 93 68	1.1 84 57	0.7 73 46	1.1 64 40
- █ Average max. and min. temperatures in °F
- █ Precipitation totals in inches
Metric conversion
J	F	M	A	M	J	J	A	S	O	N	D
22 18 4	18 20 5	18 23 7	7.6 27 10	5.1 32 14	5.1 38 20	61 37 23	56 36 22	43 34 20	28 29 14	18 23 8	28 18 4
- █ Average max. and min. temperatures in °C
- █ Precipitation totals in mm

While temperature is typically visualized using a line, some climographs opt to visualize the data using a bar. This method's advantage allows the climograph to display the average range in temperature (average minimum and average maximum temperatures) rather than a simple monthly average.

== Use ==
The patterns in a climograph describe not just a location's climate but also provide evidence for that climate's relative geographical location. For example, a climograph with a narrow range in temperature over the year might represent a location close to the equator, or alternatively a location adjacent to a large body of water exerting a moderating effect on the temperature range. Meanwhile, a wide range in annual temperature might suggest the opposite. We could also derive information about a site's ecological conditions through a climograph. For example, if precipitation is consistently low year-round, we might suggest the location reflects a desert; if there is a noticeable seasonal pattern to the precipitation, we might suggest the location experiences a monsoon season. When combining the temperature and precipitation patterns together, we have even better clues as to the local conditions. Despite this, a number of local factors contribute to the patterns observed in a particular place; therefore, a climograph is not a foolproof tool that captures all the geographic variation that might exist.
