= Spatial Synoptic Classification system =

Based upon the Bergeron air mass classification scheme is the Spatial Synoptic Classification system, or SSC. There are six categories within the SSC scheme: Dry Polar (similar to continental polar), Dry Moderate (similar to maritime superior), Dry Tropical (similar to continental tropical), Moist Polar (similar to maritime polar), Moist Moderate (a hybrid between maritime polar and maritime tropical), and Moist Tropical (similar to maritime tropical, maritime monsoon, or maritime equatorial).

The SSC was originally created in the 1950s to improve weather forecasting, and by the 1970s was a widely accepted classification system for climatologists. The initial iteration of the SSC had a major limitation: it could only classify weather types during summer and winter season.
