= Polar regions =

Regions around Earth's geographical poles

Visualization of the ice and snow covering Earth's northern and southern polar regions

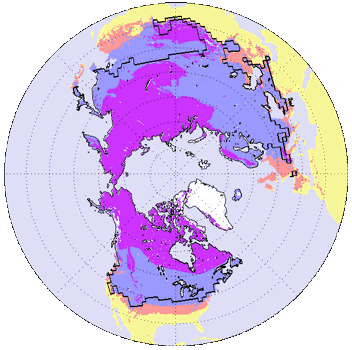
Northern Hemisphere permafrost (permanently frozen ground) in purple

The polar regions, also called the frigid zones or polar zones, of Earth are Earth's polar ice caps, the regions of the planet that surround its geographical poles (the North Pole and the South Pole), lying within the polar circles. These high latitudes are dominated by floating sea ice covering much of the Arctic Ocean in the north, and by the Antarctic ice sheet on the continent of Antarctica and the Southern Ocean in the south.

== Definitions ==
The Arctic has various definitions, including the region north of the Arctic Circle (currently Epoch 2010 at 66°33'44" N), or just the region north of 60° north latitude, or the region from the North Pole south to the timberline. The Antarctic is usually defined simply as south of 60° south latitude, or the continent of Antarctica. The 1959 Antarctic Treaty uses the former definition.

The two polar regions are distinguished from the other two climatic and biometric belts of Earth, a tropics belt near the equator, and two middle latitude regions located between the tropics and polar regions.

== Climate ==
Polar regions receive less intense solar radiation than the other parts of Earth because the Sun's energy arrives at an oblique angle, spreading over a larger area, being less concentrated, and also travels a longer distance through Earth's atmosphere in which it may be absorbed, scattered or reflected, which is the same thing that causes winters to be colder than the rest of the year except in tropical regions.

The axial tilt of Earth has the most effect on climate of the polar regions due to its latitude. However, since the polar regions are the farthest from the equator, they receive the weakest solar radiation and are therefore generally frigid year round due to Earth's axial tilt of 23.5° not being enough to create a high maximum midday declination to sufficiently compensate the Sun's rays for the high latitude even in summer, except for relatively brief periods in peripheral areas near the polar circles. The large amount of ice and snow also reflects and weakens of what weak sunlight the polar regions receive further, contributing to the cold. Polar regions are characterized by extremely cold temperatures, heavy glaciation wherever there is sufficient precipitation to form permanent ice, short and still cold summers, and extreme variations in daylight hours, with twenty-four hours of daylight in summer, and complete darkness at mid-winter.

== Subregions ==
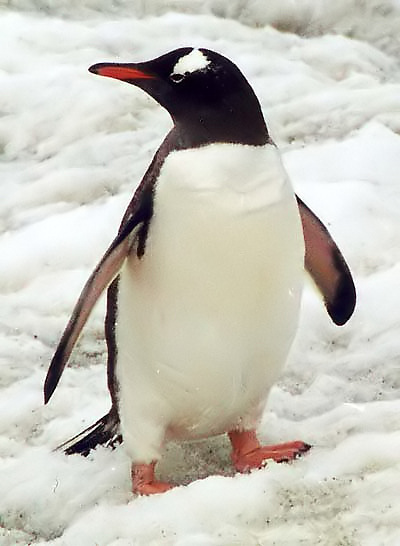
South polar region penguin

=== Antarctic ===
The southern polar region has no permanent human habitation as of now. McMurdo Station is the largest research station in Antarctica, run by the United States. Other notable stations include Palmer Station and Amundsen–Scott South Pole Station (United States), Esperanza Base and Marambio Base (Argentina), Scott Base (New Zealand), and Vostok Station (Russia).

While there are no indigenous human cultures, there is a complex ecosystem, especially along Antarctica's coastal zones. Coastal upwelling provides abundant nutrients that feed krill, a type of marine Crustacea, which in turn feed a complex of living creatures from penguins to blue whales.

=== Circumpolar Arctic region ===
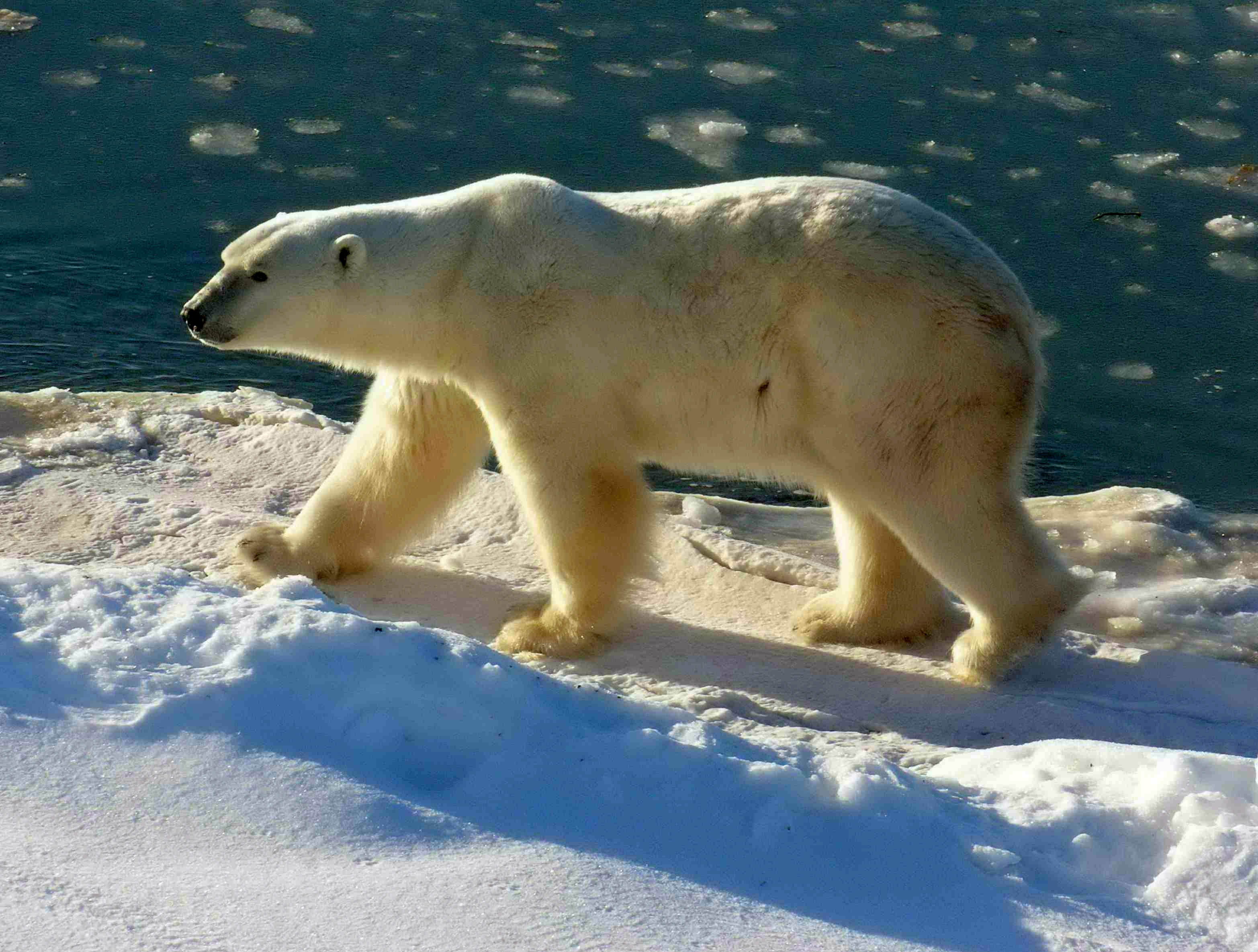
North polar region polar bears

There are many settlements in Earth's north polar region. Countries with claims to Arctic regions are: the United States (Alaska), Canada (Yukon, the Northwest Territories and Nunavut), Denmark (Greenland), Norway, Finland, Sweden, Iceland, and Russia. Arctic circumpolar populations, though small, often share more in common with each other than with other populations within their national boundaries. As such, the northern polar region is diverse in human settlements and cultures.

Nations in the region have formed the Arctic Council. According to this international forum the "Arctic States" (nation states in the Arctic region) are: Canada, Denmark (the Kingdom of Denmark, including Greenland), Finland, Iceland, Norway, Russia (the Russian Federation), Sweden, and the United States (due to Alaska).

=== The Third Pole ===
The Third Pole, also known as the Hindu Kush-Karakoram-Himalayan system (HKKH), is a mountainous region located in the west and south of the Tibetan Plateau. Part of High-mountain Asia, it spreads over an area of more than 4.2 million square kilometres (1.6 million square miles) across nine countries, i.e. Afghanistan, Bangladesh, Bhutan, China, India, Myanmar, Nepal, Pakistan and Tajikistan, bordering ten countries. The area is nicknamed the "Third Pole" because its mountain glaciers and snowfields store more frozen water than anywhere else in the world after the Arctic and Antarctic polar caps. With the world's loftiest mountains, comprising all 14 peaks above 8,000 metres (26,000 ft), it is the source of 10 major rivers and forms a global ecological buffer.

== See also ==
- Cryosphere
- Polar climate
