= Air mass =

Volume of air defined by its temperature and water vapor content

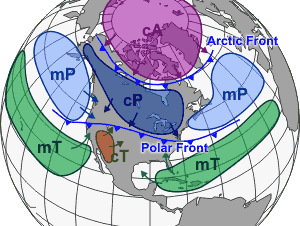
Different air masses which affect North America as well as other continents, tend to be separated by frontal boundaries

In meteorology, an air mass is a volume of air defined by its temperature and humidity. Air masses cover many hundreds or thousands of square miles, and adapt to the characteristics of the surface below them. They are classified according to latitude and their continental or maritime source regions. Colder air masses are termed polar or arctic, while warmer air masses are deemed tropical. Continental and superior air masses are dry, while maritime and monsoon air masses are moist. Weather fronts separate air masses with different density (temperature or moisture) characteristics. Once an air mass moves away from its source region, underlying vegetation and water bodies can quickly modify its character. Classification schemes tackle an air mass's characteristics, as well as modification.

== Classification and notation ==
Source regions of global air masses

The Bergeron classification is the most widely accepted form of air mass classification, though others have produced more refined versions of this scheme over different regions of the globe. Air mass classification involves three letters. The first letter describes its moisture properties – "c" represents continental air masses (dry), and "m" represents maritime air masses (moist). Its source region follows: "T" stands for Tropical, "P" stands for Polar, "A" stands for Arctic or Antarctic, "M" stands for monsoon, "E" stands for Equatorial, and "S" stands for adiabatically drying and warming air formed by significant downward motion in the atmosphere. For instance, an air mass originating over the desert southwest of the United States in summer may be designated "cT". An air mass originating over northern Siberia in winter may be indicated as "cA".

The stability of an air mass may be shown using a third letter, either "k" (air mass colder than the surface below it) or "w" (air mass warmer than the surface below it). An example of this might be a polar air mass blowing over the Gulf Stream, denoted as "cPk". Occasionally, one may also encounter the use of an apostrophe or "degree tick" denoting that a given air mass having the same notation as another it is replacing is colder than the replaced air mass (usually for polar air masses). For example, a series of fronts over the Pacific might show an air mass denoted mPk followed by another denoted mPk'.

Another convention utilizing these symbols is the indication of modification or transformation of one type to another. For instance, an Arctic air mass blowing out over the Gulf of Alaska may be shown as "cA-mPk". Yet another convention indicates the layering of air masses in certain situations. For instance, the overrunning of a polar air mass by an air mass from the Gulf of Mexico over the Central United States might be shown with the notation "mT/cP" (sometimes using a horizontal line as in fraction notation).

== Characteristics ==
Tropical and equatorial air masses are hot as they develop over lower latitudes. Tropical air masses have lower pressure because hot air rises and cold air sinks. Those that develop over land (continental) are drier and hotter than those that develop over oceans, and travel poleward on the southern periphery of the subtropical ridge. Maritime tropical air masses (mT) are sometimes referred to as trade air masses. Maritime tropical air masses that affect the United States originate in the Caribbean Sea, southern Gulf of Mexico, and tropical Atlantic east of Florida through the Bahamas. Monsoon air masses (mP) are moist and unstable. Superior air masses are dry, and rarely reach the ground. They normally reside over maritime tropical air masses, forming a warmer and drier layer over the more moderate moist air mass below, forming what is known as a trade wind inversion over the maritime tropical air mass.

Continental Polar air masses (cP) are air masses that are cold and dry due to their continental source region. Continental polar air masses that affect North America form over interior Canada. Continental Tropical air masses (cT) are a type of tropical air produced by the subtropical ridge over large areas of land and typically originate from low-latitude deserts such as the Sahara Desert in northern Africa, which is the major source of these air masses. Other less important sources producing cT air masses are the Arabian Peninsula, the central arid/semi-arid part of Australia and deserts lying in the Southwestern United States. Continental tropical air masses are extremely hot and dry. Arctic, Antarctic, and polar air masses are cold. The qualities of arctic air are developed over ice and snow-covered ground. Arctic air is deeply cold, colder than polar air masses. Arctic air can be shallow in the summer, and rapidly modify as it moves equatorward. Polar air masses develop over higher latitudes over the land or ocean, are very stable, and generally shallower than Arctic air. Polar air over the ocean (maritime) loses its stability as it gains moisture over warmer ocean waters.

== Movement and fronts ==
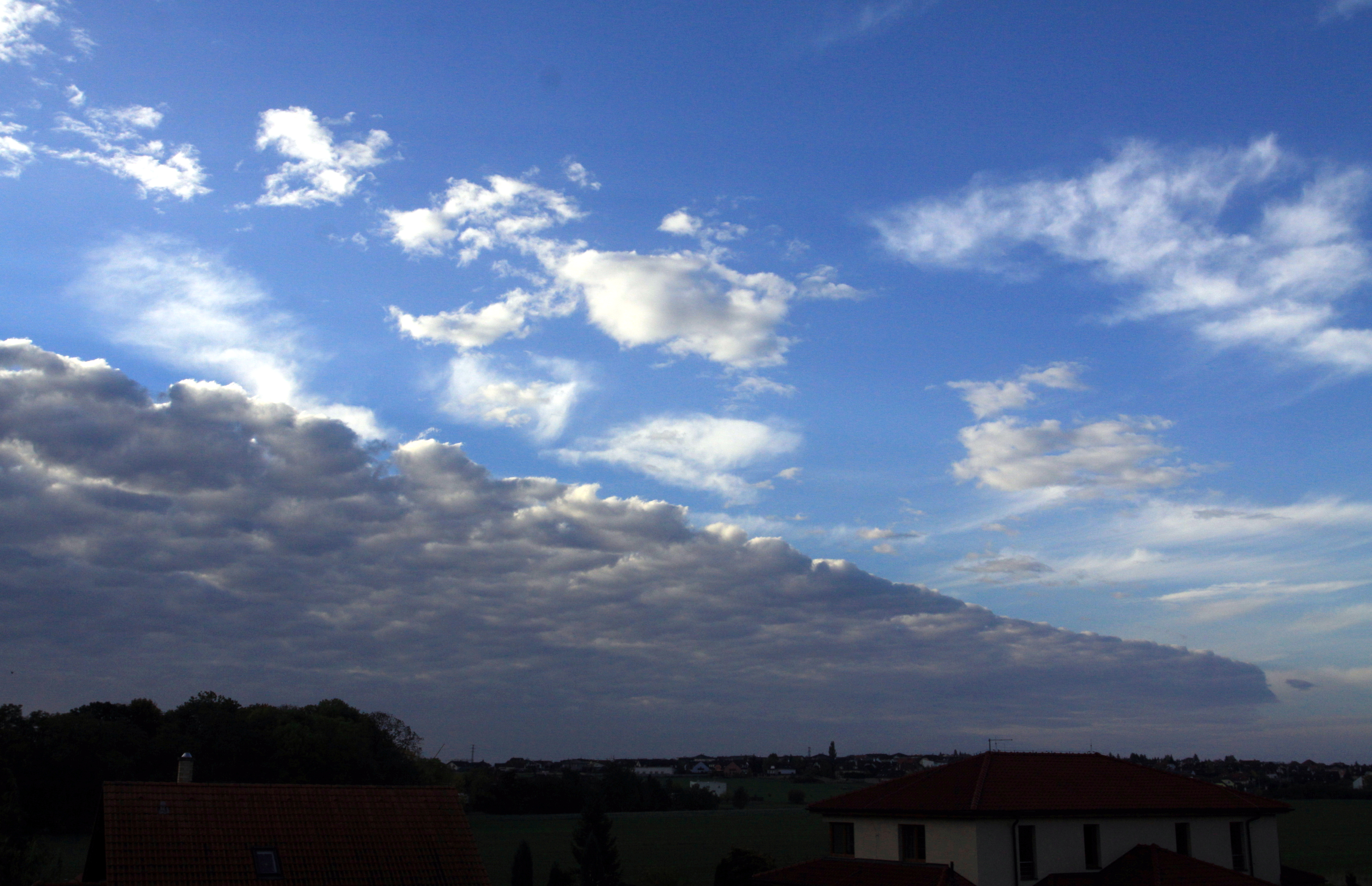
Picture of cold front (left part of the image) moving over the Czech Republic

A weather front is a boundary separating two masses of air of different densities, and is the principal cause of meteorological phenomena. In surface weather analyses, fronts are depicted using various colored lines and symbols, depending on the type of front. The air masses separated by a front usually differ in temperature and humidity. Cold fronts may feature narrow bands of thunderstorms and severe weather, and may on occasion be preceded by squall lines or dry lines. Warm fronts are usually preceded by stratiform precipitation and fog. The weather usually clears quickly after a front's passage. Some fronts produce no precipitation and little cloudiness, although there is invariably a wind shift.

Cold fronts and occluded fronts generally move from west to east, while warm fronts move poleward. Because of the greater density of air in their wake, cold fronts and cold occlusions move faster than warm fronts and warm occlusions. Mountains and warm bodies of water can slow the movement of fronts. When a front becomes stationary, and the density contrast across the frontal boundary vanishes, the front can degenerate into a line which separates regions of differing wind velocity, known as a shearline. This is most common over the open ocean.

== Modification ==
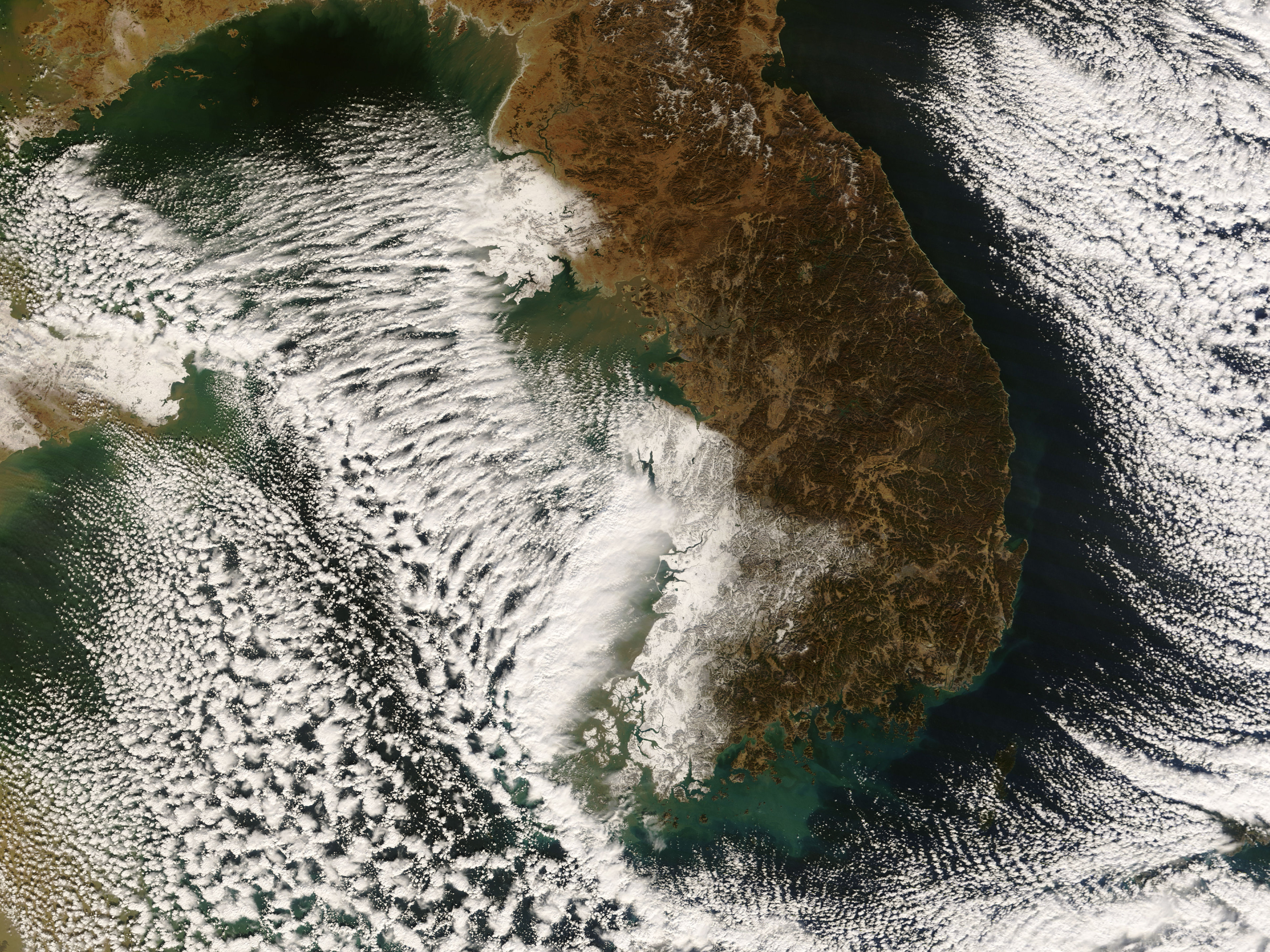
Lake-effect snow bands near the Korean Peninsula

Air masses can be modified in a variety of ways. Surface flux from underlying vegetation, such as forest, acts to moisten the overlying air mass. Heat from underlying warmer waters can significantly modify an air mass over distances as short as 35 kilometres (22 mi) to 40 kilometres (25 mi). For example, southwest of extratropical cyclones, curved cyclonic flow bringing cold air across the relatively warm water bodies can lead to narrow lake-effect snow bands. Those bands bring strong localized precipitation since large water bodies such as lakes efficiently store heat that results in significant temperature differences (larger than 13 °C or 23 °F) between the water surface and the air above. Because of this temperature difference, warmth and moisture are transported upward, condensing into vertically oriented clouds (see satellite picture) which produce snow showers. The temperature decrease with height and cloud depth are directly affected by both the water temperature and the large-scale environment. The stronger the temperature decrease with height, the deeper the clouds get, and the greater the precipitation rate becomes.

== See also ==
- Solar irradiance
- Spatial Synoptic Classification system
