= Bowman Bay (Nunavut) =

Bay in Nunavut, Canada

- Location within Nunavut
- Location: Foxe Basin
- Coordinates: 65°30′N 073°40′W
- Ocean/sea sources: Arctic Ocean
- Basin countries: Canada
- Settlements: Uninhabited

Bowman Bay is an Arctic waterway in the Qikiqtaaluk Region, Nunavut, Canada. It is located in the Foxe Basin by northeastern Foxe Peninsula off Baffin Island. The nearest community is Kinngait, situated 204 km (127 mi) to the south, while Nuwata (65°08′N 77°37′W), a former settlement, is situated 188 km (117 mi) to the west near Finnie Bay.

== Avifauna ==
During ornithologist J. Dewey Soper's 1928–31 Arctic expedition, he located the blue goose (C. c. caerulescens) nesting grounds on Bluegoose Plain by Bowman Bay.

== Conservation ==
The Bowman Bay Wildlife Sanctuary was established in 1957. The Isulijarniq Migratory Bird Sanctuary stretches from Bowman Bay to the Koukdjuak River.
