= Gibson Bay =

Bay in Nunavut, Canada

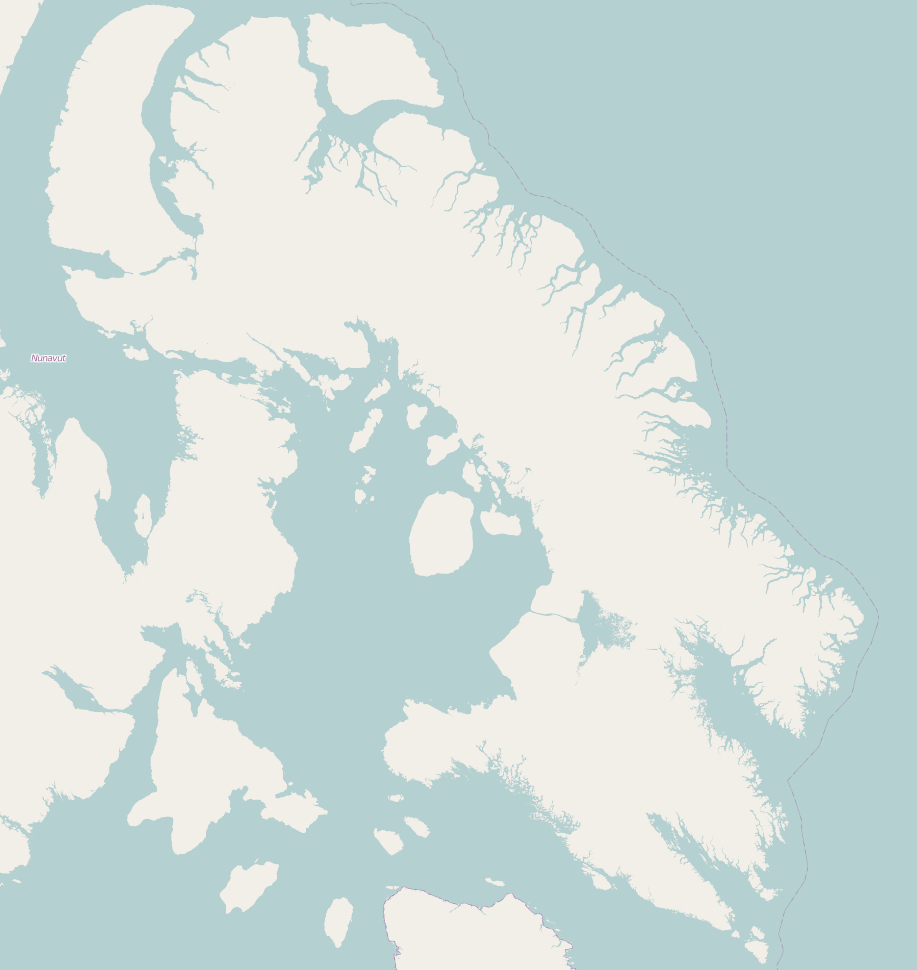
- Location within Baffin Island Location within Nunavut
- Location: Foxe Basin
- Coordinates: 65°16′N 76°00′W
- River sources: Kommanik River
- Ocean/sea sources: Arctic Ocean
- Basin countries: Canada
- Settlements: Uninhabited

Gibson Bay is an arm of the Foxe Basin in the Qikiqtaaluk Region of Nunavut, Canada. It is located on the northern coast of Foxe Peninsula, in western Baffin Island. The closest community is Kinngait, situated 123 km (76 mi) to the south, while Nuwata, a former settlement, is situated 77 km (48 mi) to the west. It is fed by the Kommanik River whose headwaters are at Kavivan Lake, 5 mi (8.0 km) to the southeast. Within the bay, there is a small island chain.
