= Nabukjuak Bay =

Bay in Nunavut, Canada

- Location within Nunavut Location within Canada
- Location: Foxe Basin
- Coordinates: 65°24′N 77°25′W
- Ocean/sea sources: Arctic Ocean
- Basin countries: Canada
- Settlements: Uninhabited

Nabukjuak Bay is an arm of the Foxe Basin in the Qikiqtaaluk Region of Nunavut, Canada. It is located on the northeastern Foxe Peninsula, in western Baffin Island. The closest community is Kinngait, situated 136 km (85 mi) to the south, while Nuwata, a former settlement, is situated 31 km (19 mi) to the west. Low and flat land characteristics proceed in a southeast direction from the bay.
