= Cory Bay =

Bay in Nunavut, Canada

- Location within Nunavut
- Location: Foxe Basin
- Coordinates: 65°25′N 74°30′W
- Ocean/sea sources: Arctic Ocean
- Basin countries: Canada
- Settlements: Uninhabited

Cory Bay is an arm of the Foxe Basin in the Qikiqtaaluk Region of Nunavut, Canada. It is located on northeastern Foxe Peninsula, in western Baffin Island. The closest community is Kinngait, situated 163 km (101 mi) to the south, while Nuwata, a former settlement, is situated about 148 km (92 mi) to the west.

The Great Plain of the Koukdjuak stretches from Cory Bay to Hantzsch Bay, and then inland.
