= Garnet Bay =

Bay in Nunavut, Canada

- Location within Nunavut
- Location: Foxe Basin
- Coordinates: 65°18′N 75°22′W
- Ocean/sea sources: Arctic Ocean
- Basin countries: Canada
- Settlements: Uninhabited

Garnet Bay is an arm of the Foxe Basin in the Qikiqtaaluk Region of Nunavut, Canada. It is located on the northern coast of Foxe Peninsula, in western Baffin Island. The closest community is Kinngait, situated 137 km (85 mi) to the south, while Nuwata—a former settlement, is situated 106 km (66 mi) to the west.

== Avifauna ==
The bay has a 4 km (2.5 mi) wide lesser snow goose nesting area.
