= Dorchester Bay (Nunavut) =

Bay in Nunavut, Canada

- Location within Nunavut
- Location: Foxe Basin
- Coordinates: 65°25′N 77°03′W
- Ocean/sea sources: Arctic Ocean
- Basin countries: Canada
- Settlements: Uninhabited

Dorchester Bay is an arm of the Foxe Basin in the Qikiqtaaluk Region of Nunavut, Canada. It is located on the northern coast of Foxe Peninsula, in western Baffin Island. Its western entrance point is Cape Willoughby. The closest community is Kinngait, situated 134 km (83 mi) to the south, while Nuwata (65°08′N 77°37′W), a former settlement, is situated 41 km (25 mi) to the west.

The bay is used by Inuit for seal hunting.
