= Koukdjuak =

Koukdjuak may refer to:

- Great Plain of the Koukdjuak
- Koukdjuak River
