= Finnie Bay =

Bay in Nunavut, Canada

- Location within Nunavut
- Location: Foxe Basin
- Coordinates: 65°13′N 77°30′W
- Ocean/sea sources: Arctic Ocean
- Basin countries: Canada
- Settlements: Uninhabited

Finnie Bay is an arm of the Foxe Basin in the Qikiqtaaluk Region of Nunavut, Canada. It is located on the northeastern Foxe Peninsula, in western Baffin Island. The area between Finnie Bay and the closest community, Kinngait, situated 118 km (73 mi) to the south, is hilly. Nuwata (65°08′N 77°37′W), a former settlement, is situated 11 km (6.8 mi) to the west.
