= Nettilling Lake =

Lake in Nunavut, Canada

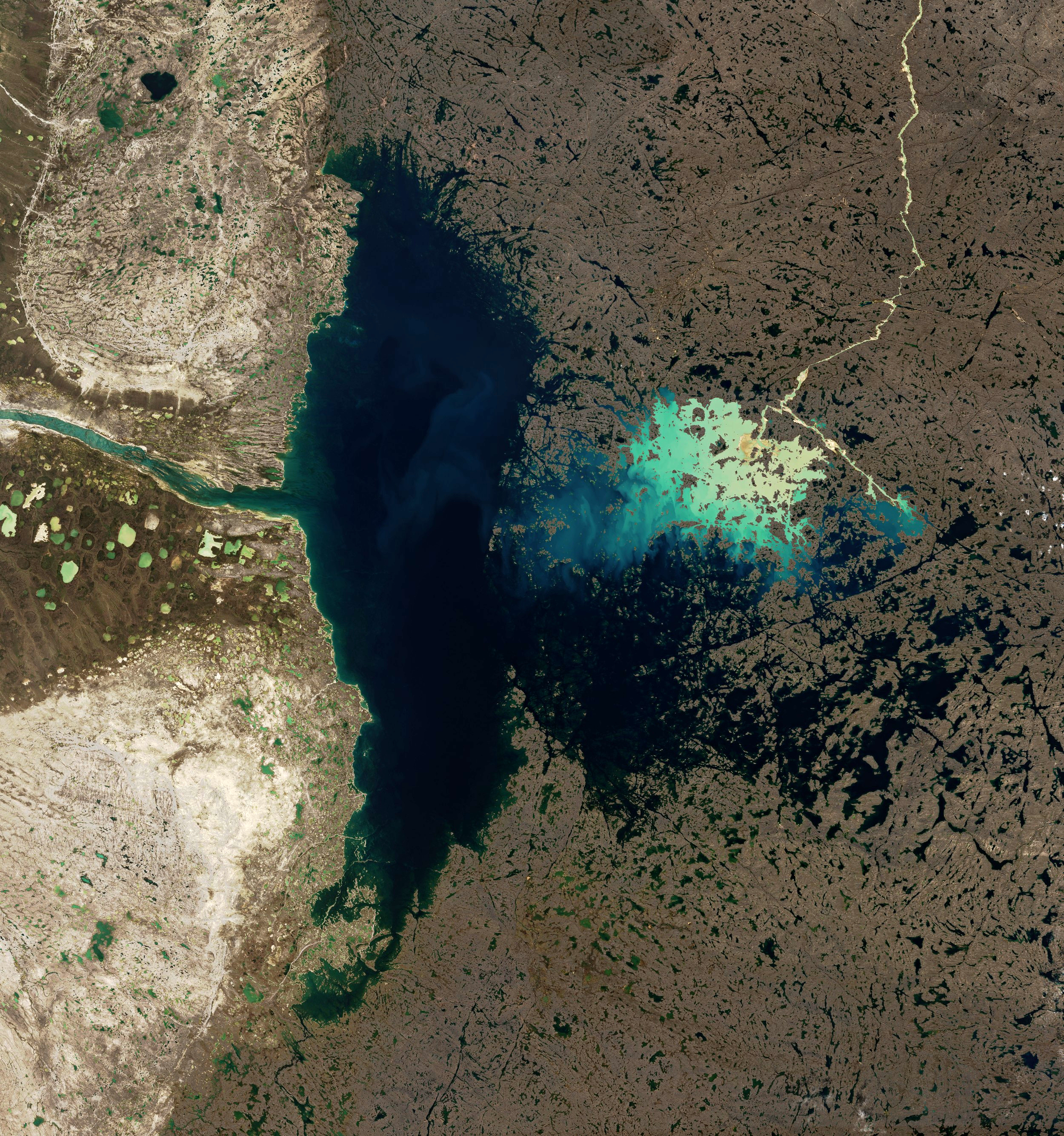
- Sentinel-2 image (2019)

- Location within Canada
- Location: Baffin Island, Qikiqtaaluk Region, Nunavut Territory
- Coordinates: 66°29′N 70°20′W-
- Primary inflows: Amadjuak Lake
- Primary outflows: Koukdjuak River
- Catchment area: 63,400 km^{2} (24,500 sq mi)
- Basin countries: Canada
- Max. length: 123 km (76 mi)
- Surface area: 5,542 km^{2} (2,140 sq mi)
- Average depth: 23.4 m (77 ft)
- Max. depth: 132 m (433 ft)
- Water volume: 130 km^{3} (31 cu mi)
- Shore length^{1}: 7,168 km (4,454 mi)
- Surface elevation: 30 m (98 ft)
- ^{1} Shore length is not a well-defined measure.

Nettilling Lake (/ˈnɛtʃ.ɪl.ɪŋ/) is a cold freshwater lake located toward the south end of Baffin Island in the Qikiqtaaluk Region, Nunavut, Canada. It is the 27th largest lake in the world by area, and the world's largest lake on an island, with an area of 5,542 km^{2} (2,140 sq mi) and a maximum length of 123 km (76 mi). The lake is in the Great Plain of the Koukdjuak about 280 km (170 mi) northwest of Iqaluit. The Arctic Circle crosses the lake. The lake's name is of Inuktitut origin, coming from the word for the adult ringed seal (netsilak). Franz Boas explored its southern shore in 1884.

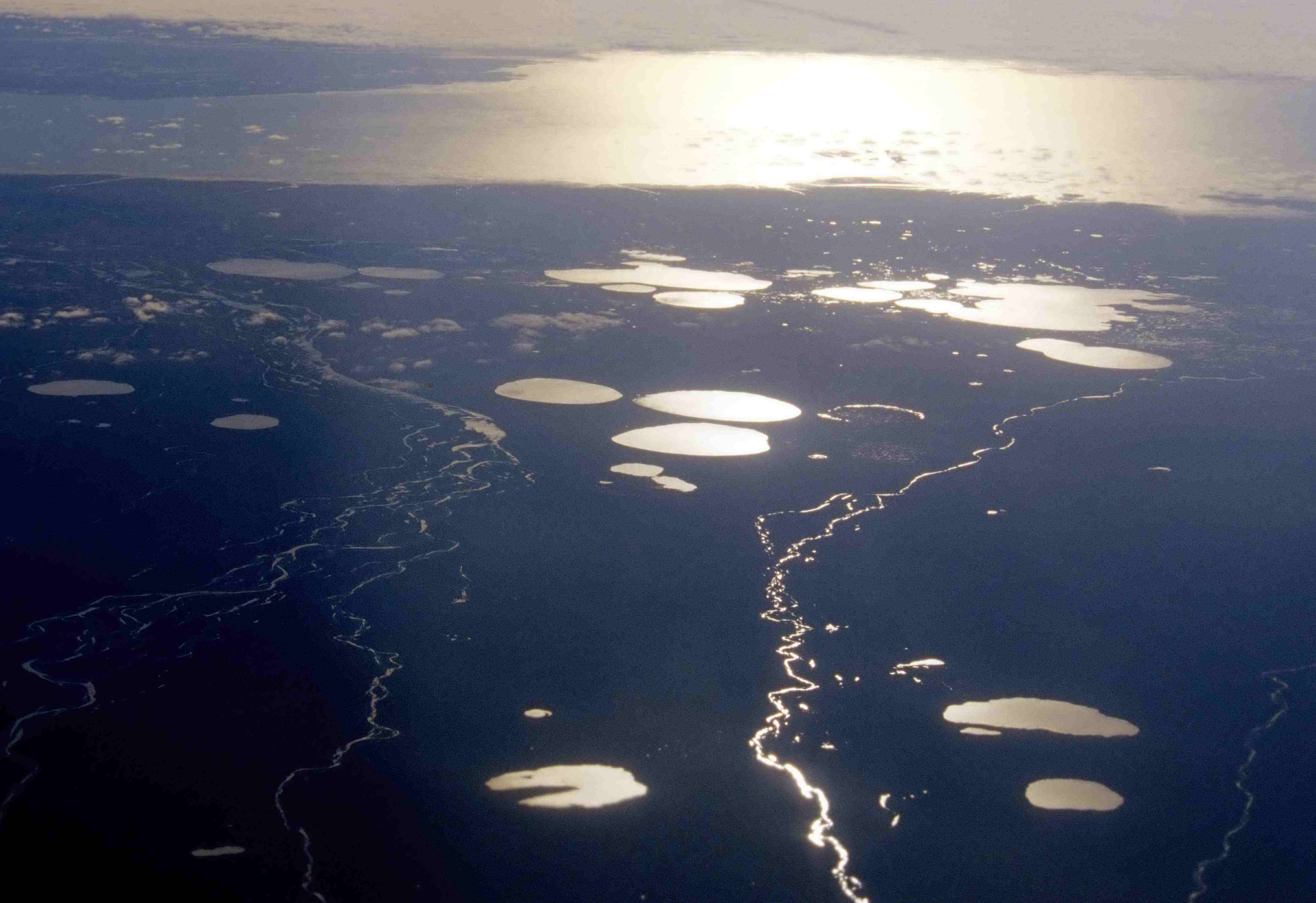
Great Koukdjuak Plains and Nettilling Lake (2002)

Nettilling is the largest lake in Nunavut. It is fed by the second largest lake on Baffin Island, Amadjuak Lake; as well as several other smaller lakes and streams. It empties west via the very shallow Koukdjuak River into Foxe Basin. The eastern half has many small islands and the western half is deeper with no islands. The lake is frozen for most of the year. Ringed seals live in the lake, along with three recorded species of fish: the Arctic char, the ninespine, and three-spined stickleback. The tundra around the lake and south to Amadjuak Lake is important for barren-ground caribou feeding and calving.

Nettilling Lake is the eleventh largest in Canada, and the seventh largest lakes entirely within Canada.
