= J. Dewey Soper =

Canadian ornithologist, explorer, and zoologist

- Born: Joseph Dewey Soper; May 5, 1893; Guelph, Ontario, Canada
- Died: November 2, 1982 (aged 89); Edmonton, Alberta, Canada
- Education: University of Alberta
- Occupations: Ornithologist, zoologist
- Spouse: Carolyn Freeman

Joseph Dewey Soper (May 5, 1893 – November 2, 1982) was a widely traveled Canadian Arctic ornithologist, explorer, zoologist, and prolific author.

== Early years ==
Soper was raised near Rockwood, Ontario where he developed an interest in wildlife and natural history. His mother wanted Soper to be a minister; his father wanted Soper to work on the farm. Soper was influenced by Henry David Thoreau's Walden and the works of Ernest Thompson Seton. He attended Alberta College and the University of Alberta where he studied zoology. Soper was first published at age 20.

== Career ==
=== Arctic expedition of 1923 ===
In 1920, William Edwin Saunders invited Soper to a naturalist's meeting at Point Pelee, Lake Erie where Soper met Dr. R. M. Anderson who went on to invite Soper to work as a naturalist on the Federal Government's East Arctic Expedition. Soper was commissioned to document the Arctic flora and fauna of Baffin Island, Beechey Island, Bylot Island, Devon Island, Ellesmere Island, northern Greenland, and areas of Labrador.

=== Arctic expedition of 1924–1926 ===
In 1924, the National Museum of Canada retained Soper for an expedition to Baffin Island. Soper headquartered at a Royal Canadian Mounted Police base that was also a Hudson's Bay Company post. During this trip, Soper explored Nettilling Lake, Koukdjuak River, Cumberland Gulf to Foxe Basin, Amadjuak Bay on Hudson Strait, Cape Dorset covering more than 4,000 miles (6,400 km) by dog sled, boat, and canoe.

=== Arctic expedition of 1928–1931 ===
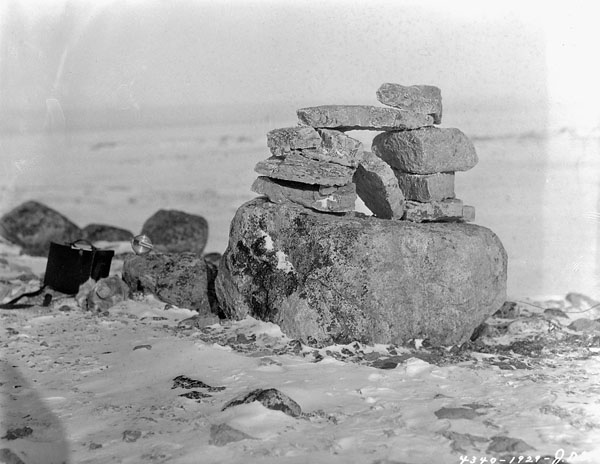
Inukshuk on top of the limestone plateau at the northern extremity, Baffin Island, photograph taken by J. Dewey Soper, 31 March 1929

Soper's biggest accomplishment, with the help of local Inuit, was the successful six-year, 30,000-mile (50,000 km) search on Baffin Island for the blue goose (C. c. caerulescens) nesting grounds on Bluegoose Plain near Bowman Bay in the Foxe Basin in the spring of 1929. The find was featured in Ripley's Believe It or Not!, earning Soper the nickname "Blue Goose Soper".(Martin, 1995)

=== Government service ===
Soper joined the government service in 1934, becoming the first Federal Chief Migratory Bird Officer for the Prairie Provinces in the Canadian Wildlife Service. In 1948, he became the Chief Federal Wildlife Officer for Alberta, Northwest Territories, and Yukon.

By the end of his career, Soper conducted three Arctic expeditions and published over 130 research papers and articles. His personal records, notebooks, mammal and bird collections, and research materials were bequeathed to the University of Alberta.

== Personal life ==
Soper visited his sister in Wetaskiwin, Alberta, in 1927 where he met and married the first graduate nurse in the Eastern Arctic, Carolyn ("Carrie") Freeman. Soper took his wife on his travels, and sometimes his young son, Roland. Though Soper was a zoologist, ornithologist, and explorer, he also collected Inuit art, including ivory figures and enjoyed hunting. When he died in 1982, he was survived by his wife, daughter, son, daughter-in-law, and five grandchildren.

== Awards and honors ==
- 1960: Doctor of Laws, honoris causa, University of Alberta
- 1978: Commissioner's Award, Northwest Territories
- 1980: Douglas H. Pimlott Conservation Award, Nature Canada
- Soper River; Soper Lake; Isulijarniq Migratory Bird Sanctuary (the 3,150 sq mi (8,200 km^{2}) of western Baffin Island from Bowman Bay to the Koukjuak River) were all named after Dr. Soper
- J. Dewey Soper Award by the Alberta Society of Professional Biologists, awarded to Canadian biologists
