= Dorchester Bay =

Dorchester Bay may refer to:

- Dorchester Bay (Boston Harbor), Massachusetts
- Dorchester Bay (Nunavut), Canada
