= Amadjuak Lake =

Lake in Nunavut, Canada

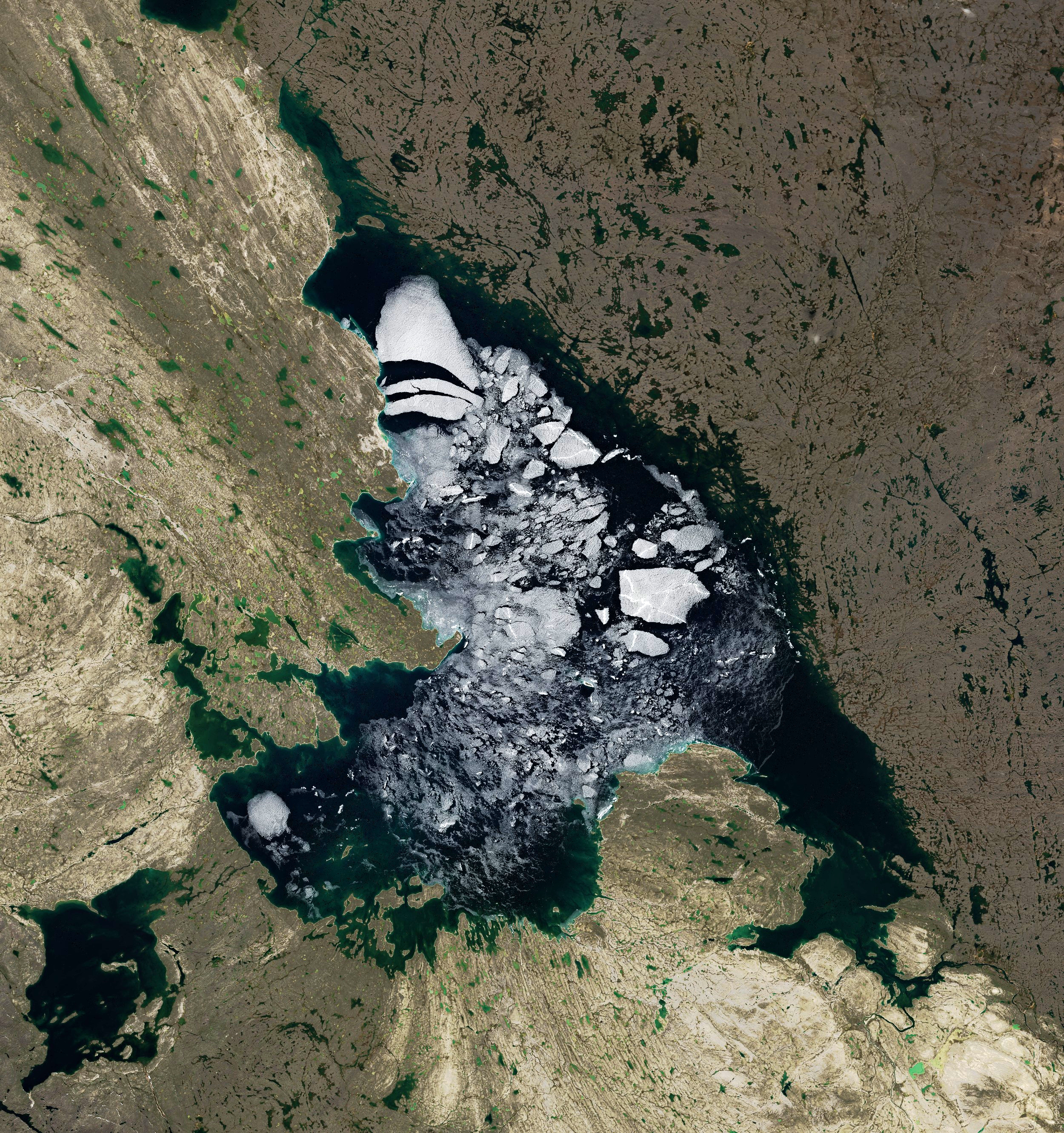
- Sentinel-2 image (2022)

- Location in Nunavut
- Location: Baffin Island, Nunavut
- Coordinates: 64°55′N 71°08′W
- Basin countries: Canada
- Surface area: 3,115 km^{2} (1,203 sq mi)
- Surface elevation: 113 m (371 ft)
- Settlements: uninhabited

Amadjuak Lake is a lake in the Qikiqtaaluk Region, Nunavut, Canada. Along with Nettilling Lake, it is located in south-central Baffin Island's Great Plain of the Koukdjuak. It is 154 km (96 mi) south of Burwash Bay. The closest community is Iqaluit.

== Geography ==
The lake is 3,115 km^{2} (1,203 sq mi) in size, and sits at an elevation of 113 m (371 ft).

This lower-lying area only emerged 4,500 years ago (recently in geological terms) from beneath the waters of Foxe Basin. Amadjuak is the second largest lake on Baffin Island (after Nettilling Lake) and third-largest in Nunavut.

== Ethnography ==
The lake was a gathering place for Inuit from Kimmirut, Soper River Valley, Pangnirtung, Kinngait, and Frobisher Bay.

== Fauna ==
Amadjuak Lake is also notable as a summer feeding grounds, calving grounds, and migration route for the Southern Qikiqtaaluk herd of barren-ground caribou.

== See also ==
- List of lakes of Nunavut
- List of lakes of Canada
