= Bowman Bay Wildlife Sanctuary =

Wildlife sanctuary on western Baffin Island, Canada

- IUCN category IV (habitat/species management area)
- Interactive map of Bowman Bay Wildlife Sanctuary
- Location: Baffin Island, Nunavut, Canada
- Coordinates: 65°42′09″N 73°29′30″W
- Area: 107,900 ha (267,000 acres)
- Established: 1957-01-01
- Governing body: Nunavut

Bowman Bay Wildlife Sanctuary is a wildlife sanctuary on western Baffin Island within part of the Great Plain of the Koukdjuak in Northern Canada's territory of Nunavut. It is classified as Category IV (Habitat/Species Management Area) under the International Union for Conservation of Nature.

== Geography ==
The sanctuary is located on the eastern shore of Foxe Basin, north of the Foxe Peninsula. Its size is 1,079 square kilometres (417 sq mi).

== History and conservation ==
During J. Dewey Soper's 1928–31 Arctic expedition in this area, he located the blue goose (C. c. caerulescens) nesting grounds on Bluegoose Plain by Bowman Bay. The wildlife sanctuary was established in 1957. It received national legal protection under the Wildlife Act of 2003.

The sanctuary protects marine and intertidal wildlife. Industrial activities and hunting are prohibited.
