= Isulijarniq Migratory Bird Sanctuary =

Protected area and Ramsar site, Nunavut, Canada

- Dewey Soper Migratory Bird Sanctuary
- IUCN category Ib (wilderness area)
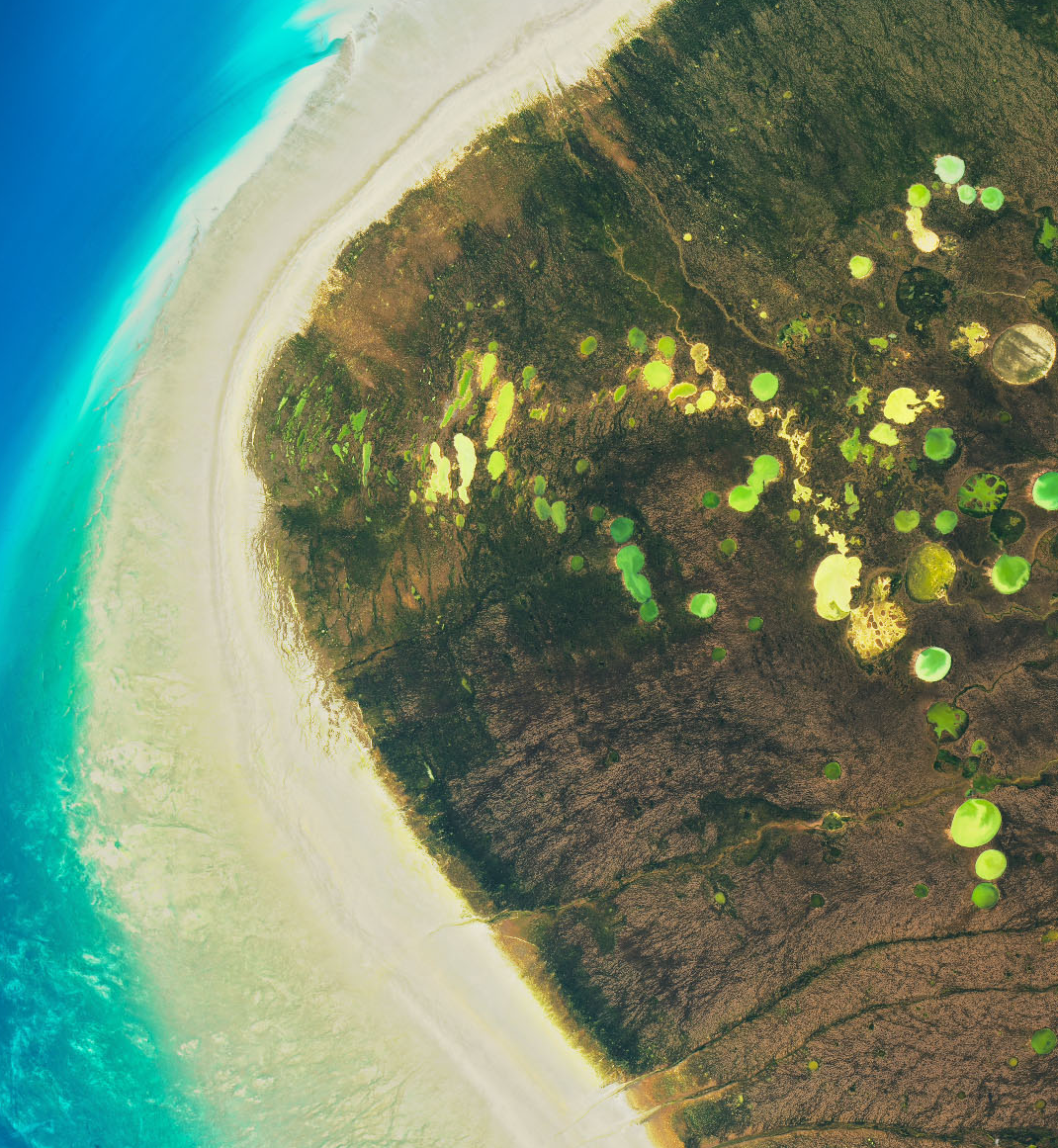
- Isulijarniq Migratory Bird Sanctuary from space

- Location within Nunavut Location within Canada
- Coordinates: 66°35′N 071°30′W
- Area: 816,599 ha (2,017,860 acres)
- Website: Isulijarniq Migratory Bird Sanctuary

Ramsar Wetland
- Designated: 24 May 1982
- Reference no.: 249

The Isulijarniq Migratory Bird Sanctuary formerly the Dewey Soper Migratory Bird Sanctuary, or Dewey Soper, is a migratory bird sanctuary in the Qikiqtaaluk Region, Nunavut, Canada. It is located in western Baffin Island, from Bowman Bay to the Koukdjuak River, and is named in honour of zoologist J. Dewey Soper. It is an 8,159 km^{2} (3,150 sq mi) area that was classified a wetland of international importance via the Ramsar Convention on May 24, 1982. The bird sanctuary supports nearly 30% of the breeding geese in Canada, making it the largest goose colony in the world. Up to two million birds of various species use the area for summer nesting, and it is also "habitat for one of Canada's major barren-ground caribou herds". The sanctuary was established in 1957, and is subject to the Nunavut Land Claims Agreement, which defines and governs ownership, land use and hunting rights in the area.

It is an intertidal zone on a broad coastal plain with raised, slightly sloping beaches, spotted with circular shallow lakes and a marsh plain.

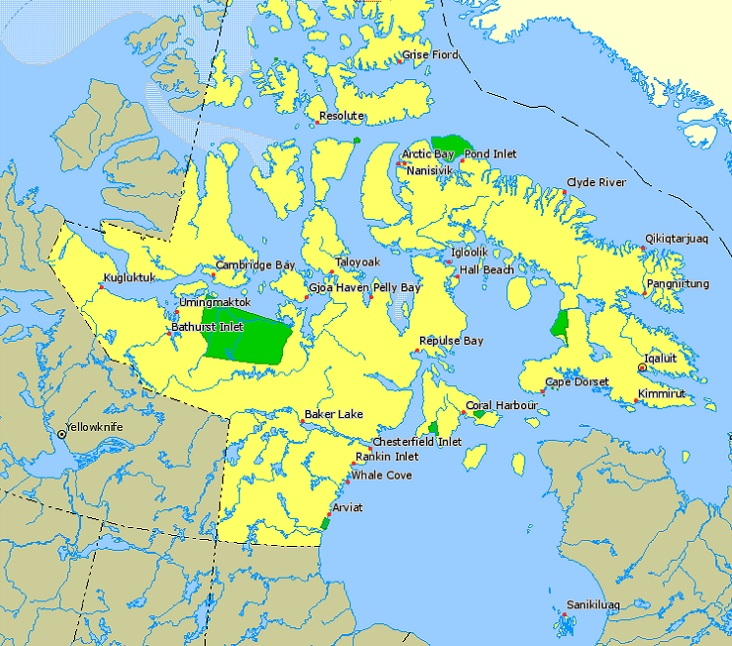
Nunavut bird sanctuaries in green

== See also ==
- List of birds of Nunavut
- List of Migratory Bird Sanctuaries of Canada#Nunavut
- List of protected areas of Nunavut
