= Koukdjuak River =

River in Canada

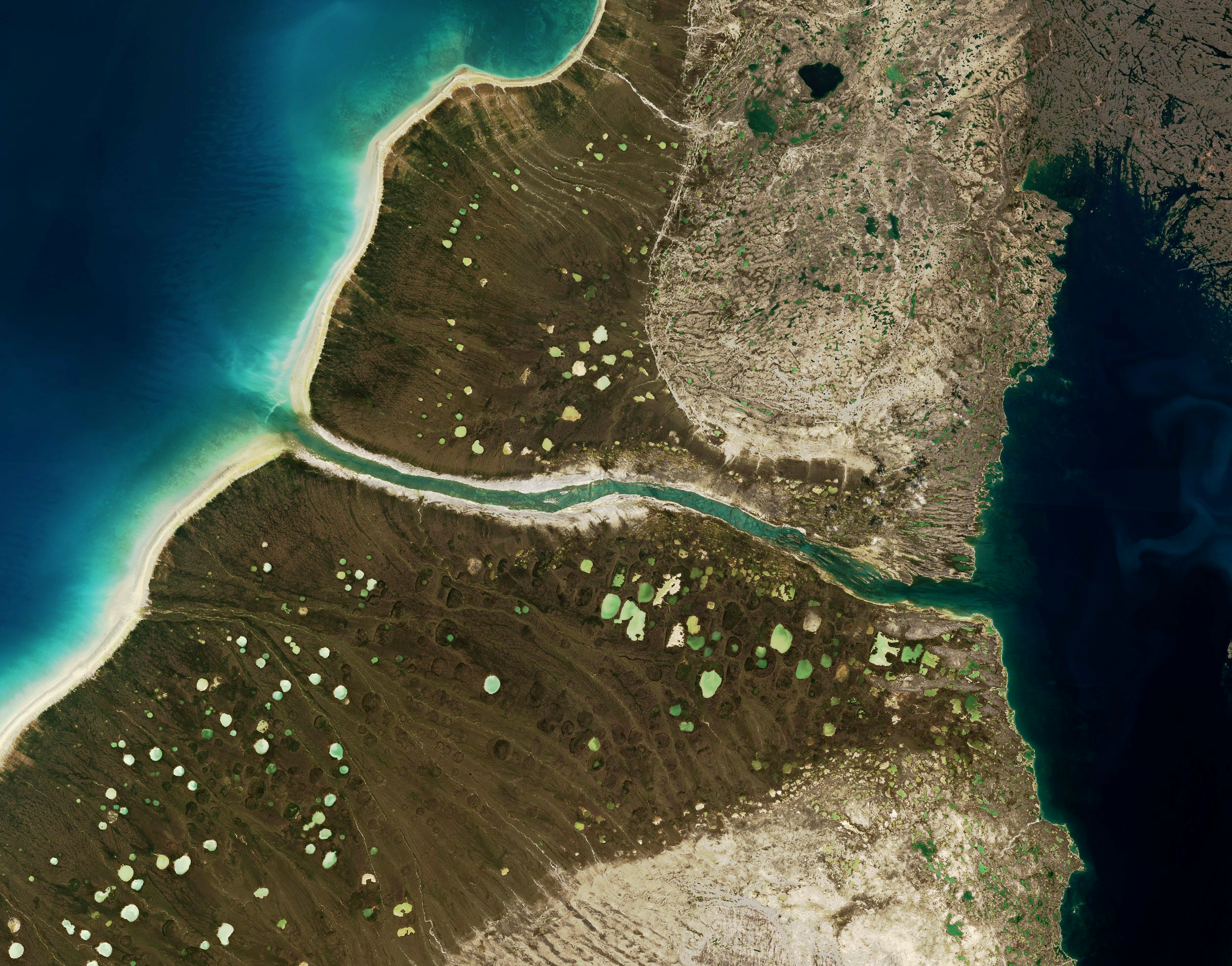

Location
- Country: Canada
- Territory: Nunavut

Physical characteristics
- Source: Nettilling Lake
  - location: Southern Baffin Island
  - coordinates: 66°34′48″N 71°21′23″W
  - elevation: 28 m (92 ft)
- Mouth: Foxe Basin
  - coordinates: 66°44′30″N 73°03′21″W
  - elevation: 0 ft (0 m)
- Length: 80 km (50 mi)
- Basin size: 66,542.8 km^{2} (25,692.3 sq mi)
- Discharge
  - location: Near mouth
  - average: (Period: 1971–2000)689.2 m^{3}/s (24,340 cu ft/s)

Basin features
- River system: Koukdjuak River

The Koukdjuak River begins at the outlet of Nettilling Lake and empties into the Arctic Ocean. It is the namesake of the Great Plain of the Koukdjuak located in the Foxe Basin on western Baffin Island, Nunavut (formerly Northwest Territories), northern Canada.

The first non-Inuit who specifically explored the river was the Canadian Arctic explorer/ornithologist, J. Dewey Soper. The northern boundary of the Isulijarniq Migratory Bird Sanctuary is the middle thread of the Koukdjuak River. The river is also notable as a Barren-ground caribou migration crossing and for Arctic charr fishing.

== See also ==
- List of rivers of Nunavut
