= Great Plain of the Koukdjuak =

Coordinates: 66°25′00″N 72°50′00″W

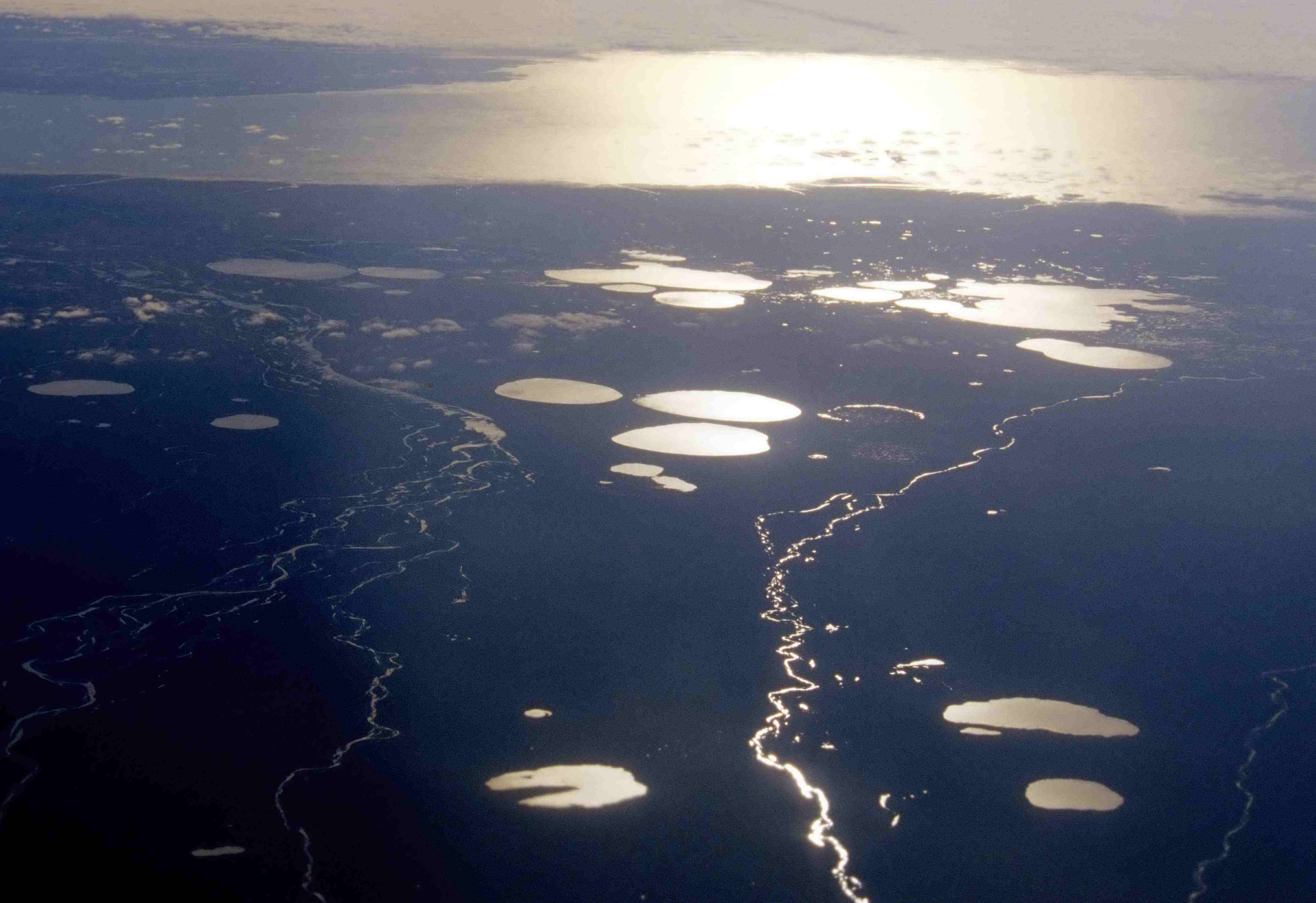
Great Koukdjuak Plains and Nettilling Lake (2002)

The Great Plain of the Koukdjuak is located in the Qikiqtaaluk Region, Nunavut within the Canadian Arctic. It is the namesake of the Koukdjuak River in western Baffin Island on the southeastern coast of Foxe Basin. It stretches from Cory Bay to Hantzsch Bay, and then inland.

== Geography ==
The plain is about 120 mi (190 km) long, 60–90 mi (97–145 km) wide and has an area of 15,777.98 km^{2} (6,091.91 sq mi). It is characterized as a broad, flat, water-logged lowland with a tidal zone that may extend as far as 15 km (9.3 mi) inland. The Plain's boundaries include raised beach ridges 25–80 km (16–50 mi) inland and granite outcrops to the south. Its tundra covers clay soils, limestone and shale bedrock.

== Fauna ==
It is notable for migratory bird and wildlife (Barren-ground caribou crossing) habitat. The plain supports the largest goose colony in the world. It is a breeding ground or habitat for lesser snow geese, Canada geese, long-tailed ducks, king eider, common eider, and Atlantic brant. It is a natural habitat for shorebirds, such as the red phalarope. It is classified as an Important Bird Area, an International Biological Program designated site and a Key Habitat Site.

== Conservation status ==
- Isulijarniq Migratory Bird Sanctuary (federal)
- Ramsar Site (Wetland of International Significance)
- Bowman Bay Wildlife Sanctuary
