= Foxe Peninsula =

Peninsula in Baffin Island, Nunavut

Coordinates: 65°N 076°W

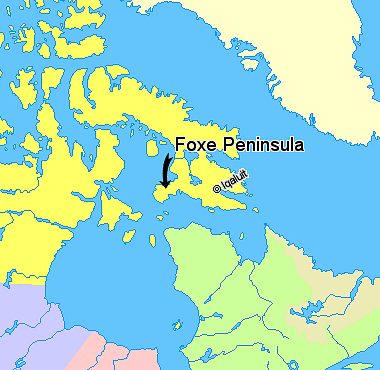
Foxe Peninsula, Nunavut, Canada. Nunavut Greenland Quebec Newfoundland and Labrador Manitoba Ontario

Foxe Peninsula is a peninsula found at the southern end of Baffin Island in the Qikiqtaaluk Region of Nunavut, Canada. It juts out from the southern end of the island in a southwestern direction, dividing Foxe Basin and Hudson Strait. Its western extremity is Cape Queen; to the southeast lies the Inuit hamlet of Kinngait. At the western coast is Inuksuk Point, which contains more than 100 inuksuit.

The peninsula is 241 km (150 mi) long and 80 km (50 mi) to 161 km (100 mi) wide.

The peninsula is named for the English explorer Luke Foxe.

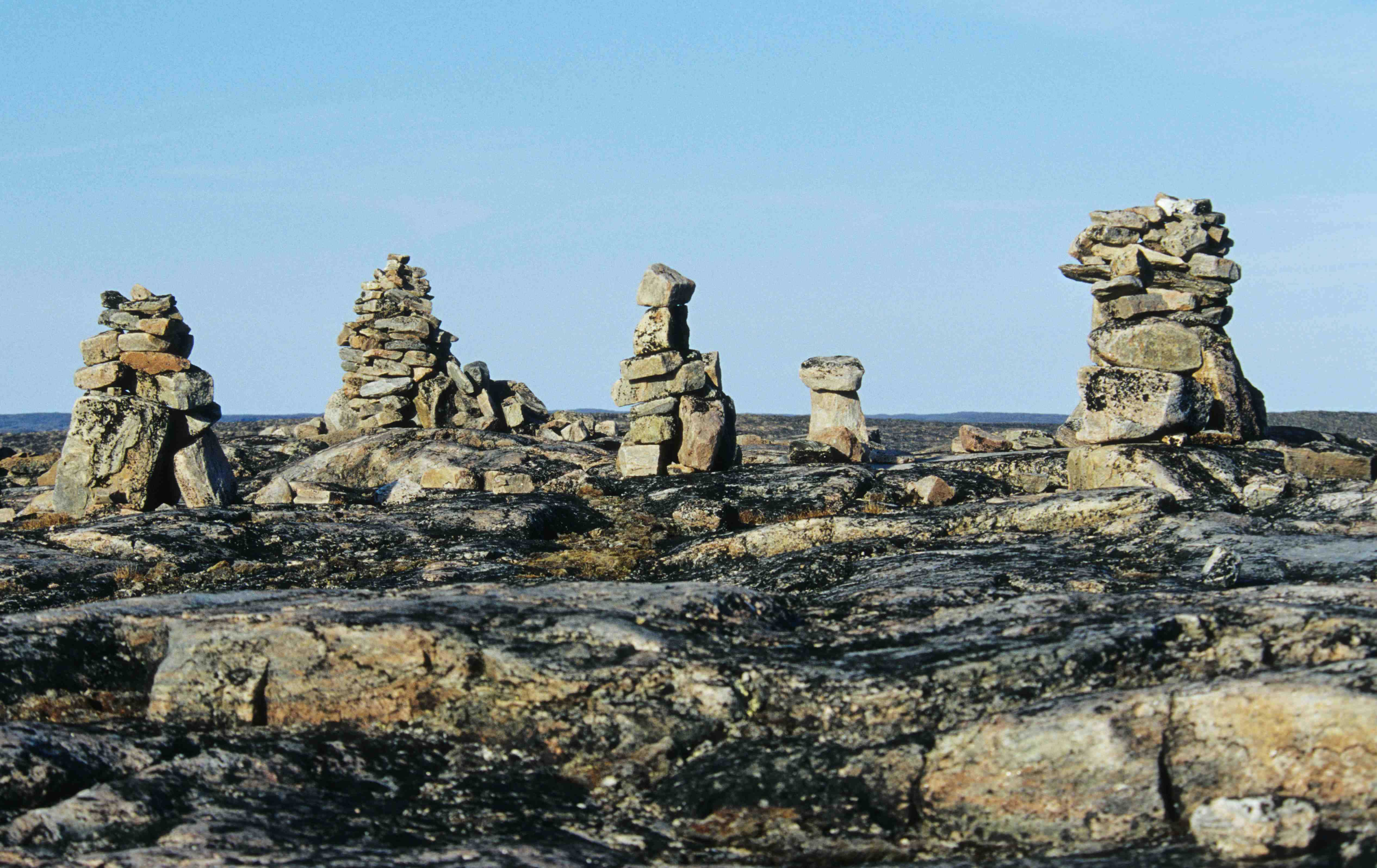
Inuksuit at the Foxe Peninsula (Baffin Island), Canada

== Exploration ==
The first exploration of the Foxe Peninsula by Europeans was carried on by Luke Foxe in 1631. Although the exact route of his ship, Charles, remains uncertain, it is believed that he surveyed the coast of the Foxe Peninsula during September 1631 as far as the Cape Dorchester. During his journey Luke Foxe named several features on the coast of the Foxe Peninsula, notably Cape Dorset, King Charles Cape, Cape Queen, and Cape Dorchester. However, the exact position of the named places cannot be ascertained accurately due to discrepancies between Foxeʼs MS journal and his written narrative published later. Although many of the names invented by Luke Foxe in 1631 are used even today, it is almost certain that the places which hold the names do not match the positions as described by Foxe.

Further exploration of the peninsula by Europeans was very sporadic over the next three centuries. Several portions of the coast of the Foxe Peninsula were explored by Donald Baxter MacMillan, who wintered in Schooner Harbour in 1921-1922, and George P. Putnam, who mapped the north coast of the peninsula in 1927. Interior of the peninsula was explored by J. Dewey Soper between 1928 and 1929. During his 1928-1929 exploration Soper was residing in Cape Dorset, from which he made several journeys across the peninsula. Mapping of the Foxe Peninsula was completed between 1956 and 1957 through geodetic survey utilising SHORAN (Short-Range Aid to Navigation) electronic length measurement.

== Bibliography ==
- Christy, Miller. The Voyages of Captain Luke Foxe of Hull, and Captain Thomas James of Bristol in Search of a North-West Passage, in 1631-32; with narratives of the earlier northwest voyages of Frobisher, Davis, Weymouth, Hall, Knight, Hudson, Button, Gibbons, Bylot, Baffin, Hawkridge, ad others. Volume I. Hakluyt Society, 1894. Hakluyt Society, First Series, Number 88.
- Christy, Miller. The Voyages of Captain Luke Foxe of Hull, and Captain Thomas James of Bristol in Search of a North-West Passage, in 1631-32; with narratives of the earlier northwest voyages of Frobisher, Davis, Weymouth, Hall, Knight, Hudson, Button, Gibbons, Bylot, Baffin, Hawkridge, ad others. Volume II. Hakluyt Society, 1894. Hakluyt Society, First Series, Number 89.
- Christy, Miller. The Voyages of Captain Luke Foxe of Hull, and Captain Thomas James of Bristol in Search of a North-West Passage, in 1631-32; with narratives of the earlier northwest voyages of Frobisher, Davis, Weymouth, Hall, Knight, Hudson, Button, Gibbons, Bylot, Baffin, Hawkridge, ad others. Volume I. Routledge, 2016. New print-on-demand hardback edition from the first edition published by Hakluyt Society in 1894. Hakluyt Society, First Series, Number 88. ISBN 978-1-4094-1355-4.
- Christy, Miller. The Voyages of Captain Luke Foxe of Hull, and Captain Thomas James of Bristol in Search of a North-West Passage, in 1631-32; with narratives of the earlier northwest voyages of Frobisher, Davis, Weymouth, Hall, Knight, Hudson, Button, Gibbons, Bylot, Baffin, Hawkridge, ad others. Volume II. Routledge, 2016. New print-on-demand hardback edition from the first edition published by Hakluyt Society in 1894. Hakluyt Society, First Series, Number 89. ISBN 978-1-4094-1356-1.
- Day, Alan. Historical Dictionary of the Discovery and Exploration of the Northwest Passage. Scarecrow Press, 2006. ISBN 0-8108-5486-4.
- Martin, Constance – Soper, J. Dewey. Search for the Blue Goose: J. Dewey Soper – the Arctic Adventures of a Canadian Naturalist. Bayeux Arts, 1995. ISBN 1-896209-14-9.
- Mills, William James. Exploring Polar Frontiers: A Historical Encyclopedia. Volume 1. A-L. ABC-CLIO, 2003. ISBN 1-57607-422-6.
- Nuttall, Mark (ed.). Encyclopedia of the Arctic. Routledge, 2005. Edition published in Taylor & Francis e-Library. ISBN 0-203-99785-9.
- Stewart, R. A. Mapping the Foxe Peninsula from Aerial Electronic Control. Photogrammetric Engineering, vol. 26, no. 1, March 1960, pp. 119–122.
