= Baffin Island =

Largest Arctic island in Nunavut, Canada

Native name: ᕿᑭᖅᑖᓗᒃ (Qikiqtaaluk)
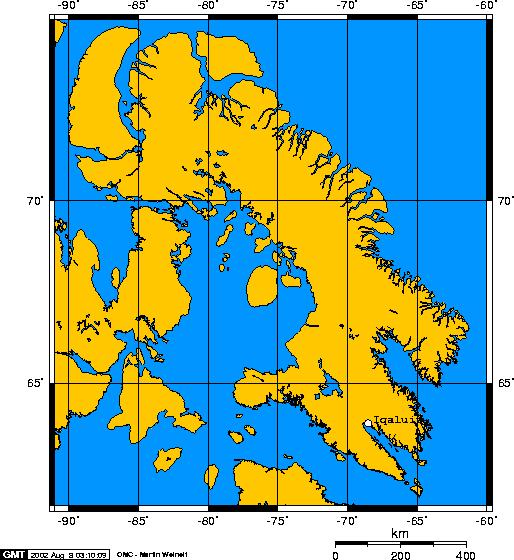

- Location within Nunavut Location within Canada

Geography
- Location: Northern Canada
- Coordinates: 68°N 70°W
- Archipelago: Arctic Archipelago
- Area: 507,204.95 km^{2} (195,832.93 sq mi) (2026)
- Area rank: 1st in Canada & 5th worldwide
- Highest elevation: 2,147 m (7044 ft)
- Highest point: Mount Odin

Administration
- Canada
- Territory: Nunavut
- Largest settlement: Iqaluit (pop. 7,429)

Demographics
- Population: 13,039 (2021)
- Pop. density: 0.03/km^{2} (0.08/sq mi)
- Ethnic groups: Inuit (72.7%), non-Aboriginal (25.3%), First Nations (0.7%), Métis (0.5%)

Baffin Island (Note: formerly Baffin Land and also James Island) in the Canadian territory of Nunavut, is the largest island in Canada, the second-largest island in the Americas (behind Greenland), and the fifth-largest island in the world. As of July 31, 2026 its area is 507,204.95 square kilometres (195,832.93 square miles) with a population density of 0.026/km^{2} (0.067/sq mi); the population was 13,039 according to the 2021 Canadian census; and it is located at 68°N 70°W. Iqaluit, the capital of Nunavut, is located on Frobisher Bay on the southern tip of the island. It has been inhabited for at least 3,000 years and possibly much longer; evidence of the earliest known circumpolar peoples is evident on the islands.

== Name ==
The Inuktitut name for the island is Qikiqtaaluk, which means "very big island" (qikiqtaq "island" + -aluk "very big") and in Inuktitut syllabics is written as ᕿᑭᖅᑖᓗᒃ. This name is used for the administrative region the island is part of (Qikiqtaaluk Region), as well as in multiple places in Nunavut and the Northwest Territories, such as some smaller islands: Qikiqtaaluk in Baffin Bay and Qikiqtaaluk in Foxe Basin. Norse explorers are believed to have referred to it as Helluland ("stone land").

In 1576, English seaman Martin Frobisher, the namesake of Frobisher Bay, made landfall on the island, naming it "Queen Elizabeth's Foreland". The island's present name refers to English explorer William Baffin, who charted Baffin Bay in 1616. It was bestowed by Edward Parry in 1821.

== Geography ==
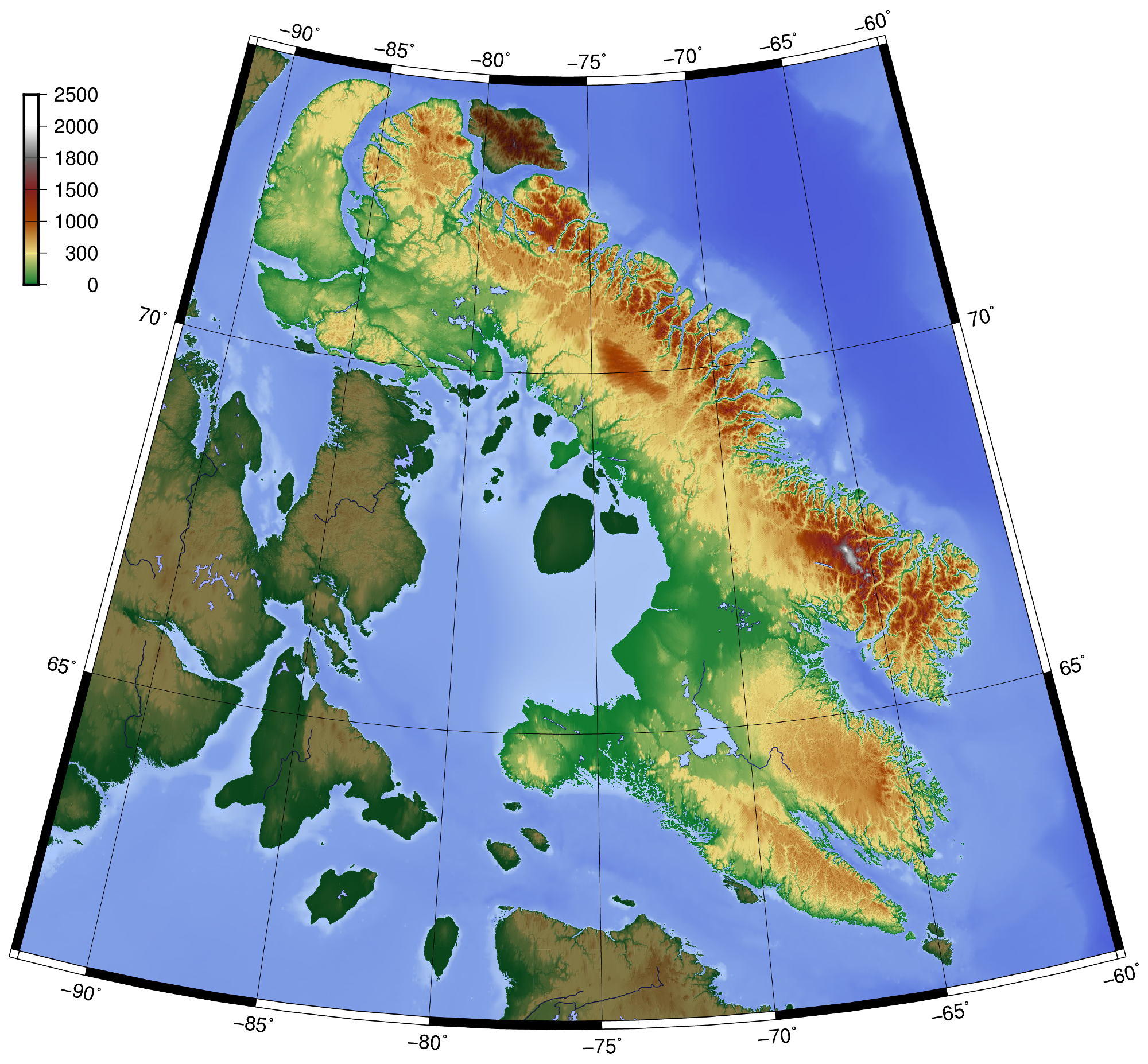
Topography of Baffin Island

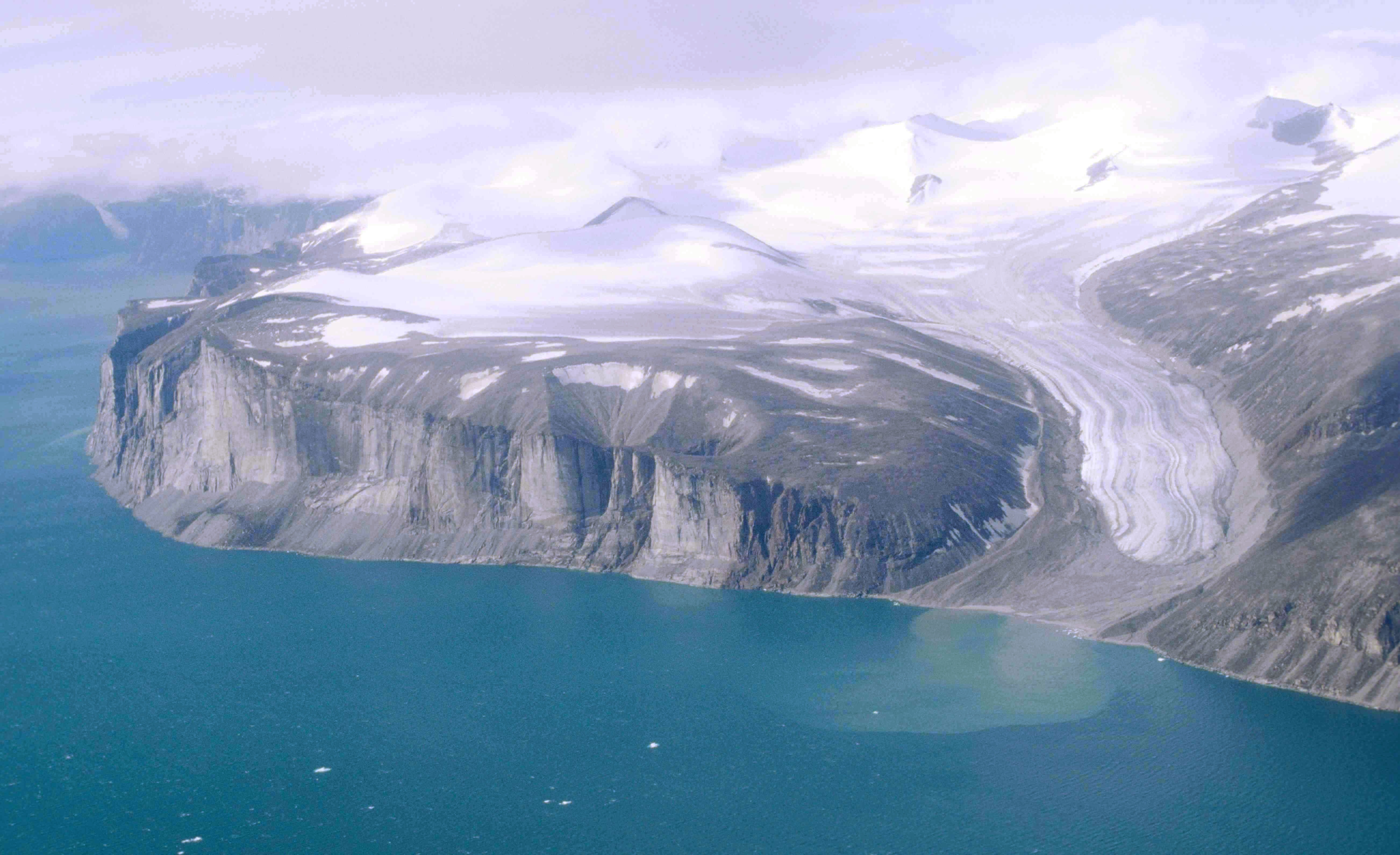
Coast of the Remote Peninsula in Kangiqtualuk Uqquqti (Sam Ford Fjord), northeast Baffin Island

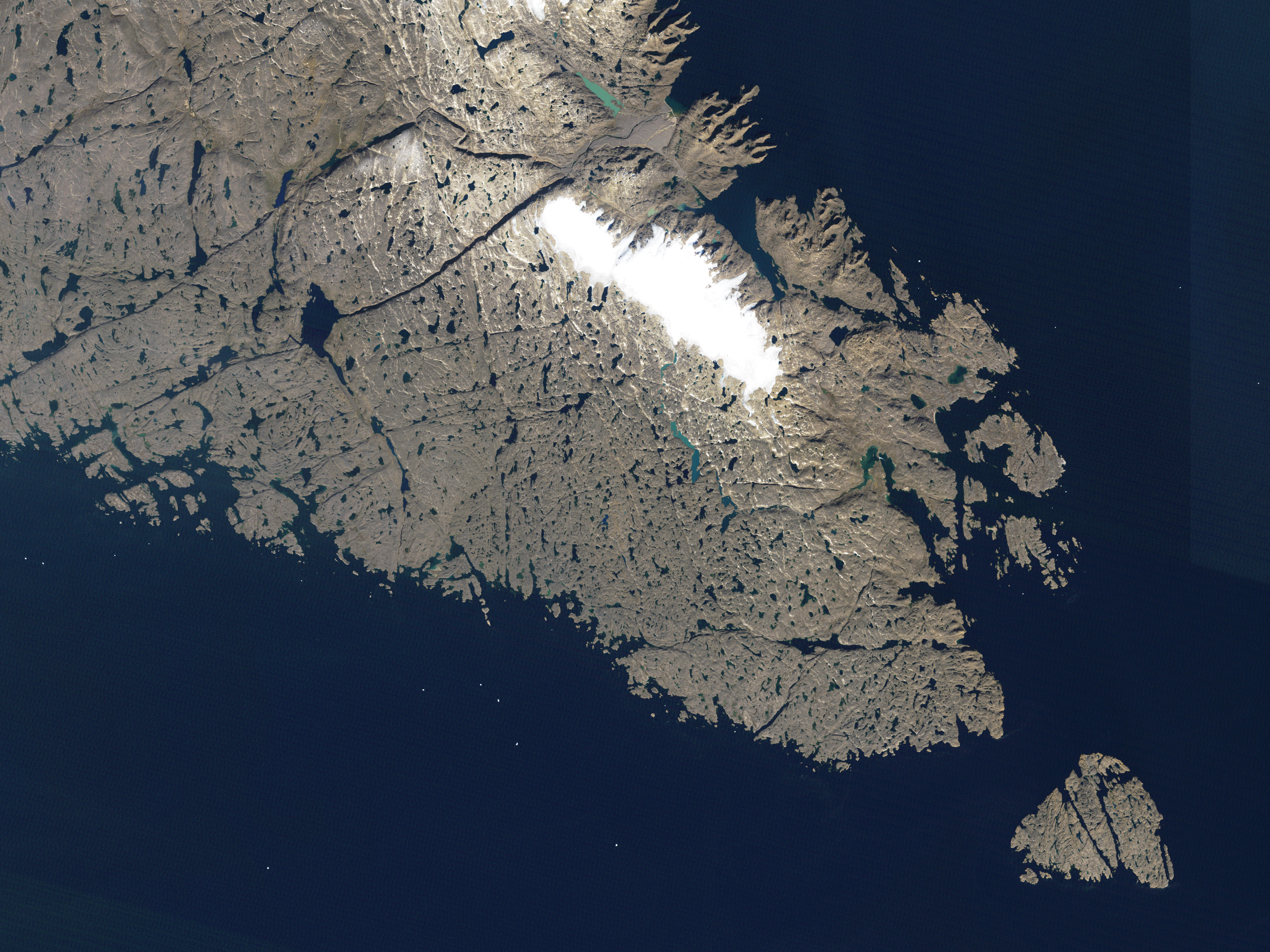
Southern tip of Baffin Island

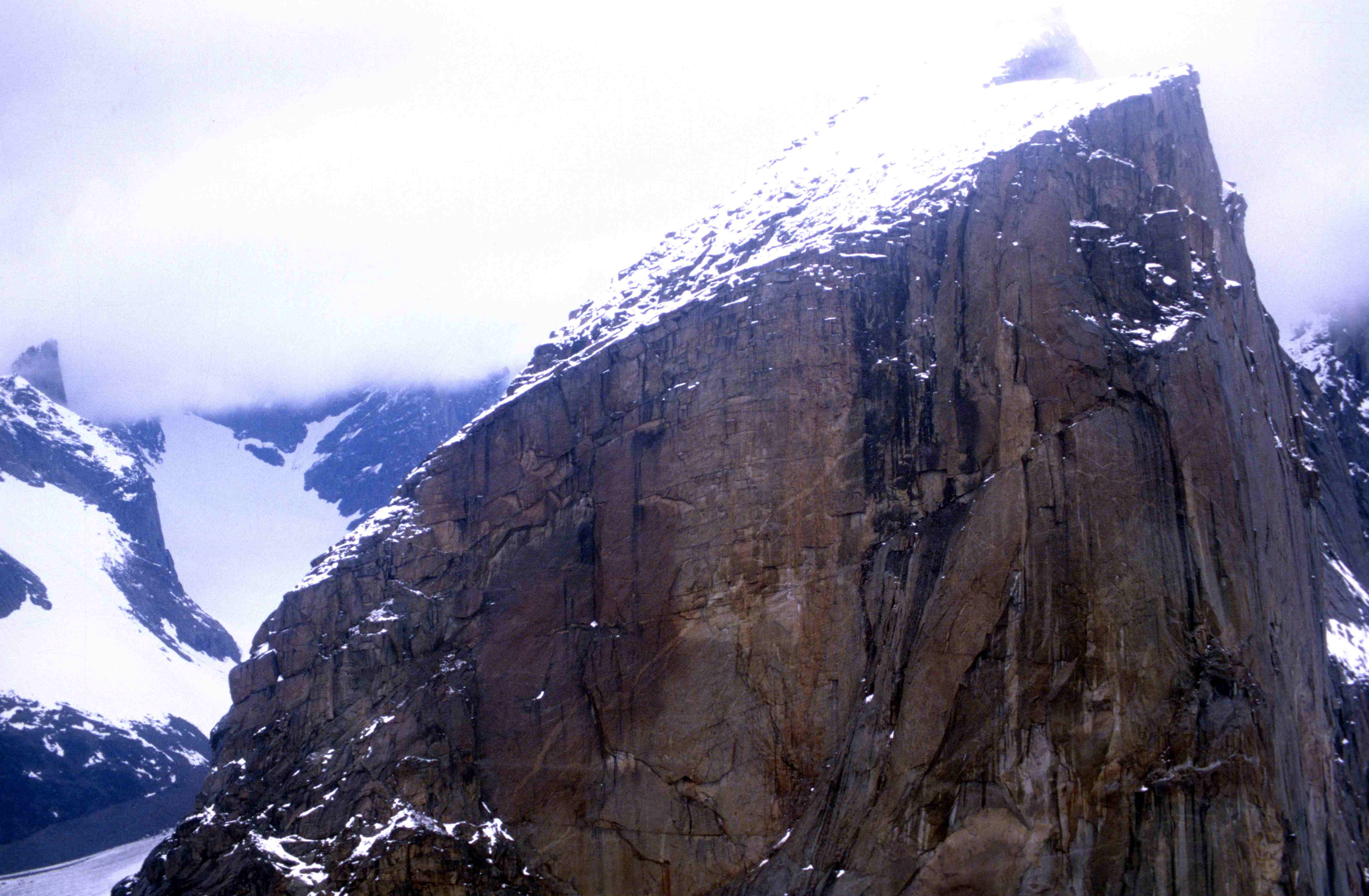
Mount Thor, a large cliff on Baffin Island

Map of Thule expansion in Canada and Greenland

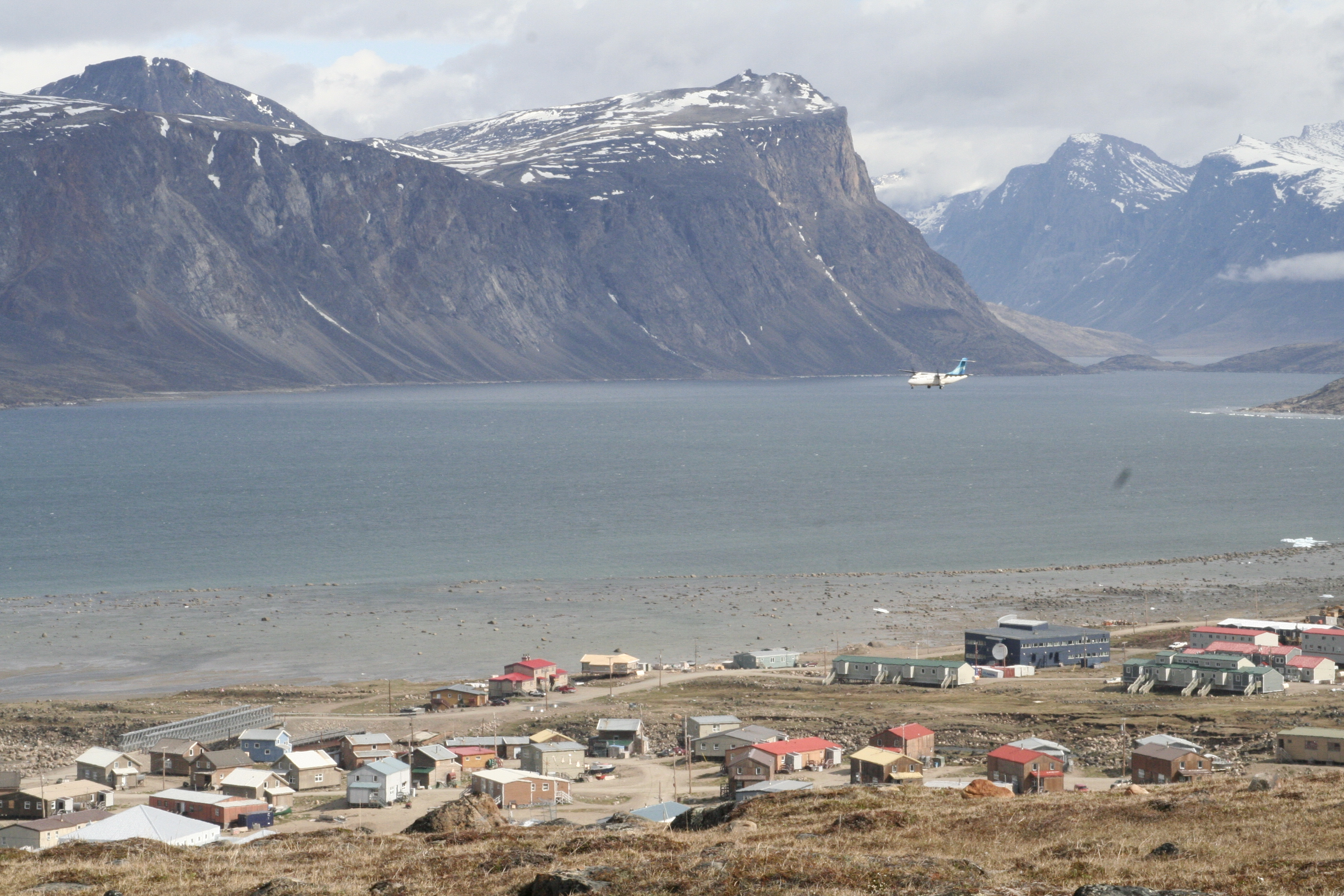
Pangnirtung

Iqaluit, the capital of Nunavut, is located on the southeastern coast. Until 1987, the town was called Frobisher Bay, after the English name for Frobisher Bay on which it is located, named for Martin Frobisher. That year, the community voted to restore the Inuktitut name.

To the south lies Hudson Strait, separating Baffin Island from mainland Quebec. South of the western end of the island is Fury and Hecla Strait, which separates the island from the Melville Peninsula on the mainland. To the east are Davis Strait and Baffin Bay, with Greenland to the east. Prince Regent Inlet and the Gulf of Boothia separate the island from Somerset Island and the Boothia Peninsula, respectively. Foxe Basin, with Prince Charles Island, is in the southwest. In the north, Lancaster Sound separates it from Devon Island and the rest of the Queen Elizabeth Islands.

The Baffin Mountains run along the northeastern coast of the island and are a part of the Arctic Cordillera. The highest peak is Mount Odin, with an elevation of at least 2,143 metres (7,031 feet), although some sources say 2,147 m (7,044 ft). Another peak of note is Mount Asgard, located in Auyuittuq National Park, with an elevation of 2,011 m (6,598 ft). Mount Thor, with an elevation of 1,675 m (5,495 ft), is said to have the greatest purely vertical drop (a sheer cliff face) of any mountain on Earth, at 1,250 m (4,100 ft).

The two largest lakes on the island lie in the south-central part of the island: Nettilling Lake (5,542 km^{2}; 2,140 sq mi) and Amadjuak Lake (3,115 km^{2}; 1,203 sq mi) further south.

== History ==
Baffin Island has been inhabited for over 3,000 years, first by the pre-Dorset, followed by the Dorset, and then by the Thule people, ancestors of the Inuit, who have lived on the island for the last thousand years. The Thule people genetically and culturally completely replaced the Dorset people some time after 1300 CE.

In about 986, Erik Thorvaldsson, known as Erik the Red, formed three settlements near the southwestern tip of Greenland. In late 985 or 986, Bjarni Herjólfsson, sailing from Iceland to Greenland, was blown off course and sighted land southwest of Greenland. Bjarni appears to be the first European to see Baffin Island, and the first European to see North America beyond Greenland. About 15 years later the Norse Greenlanders, led by Leif Erikson, a son of Erik the Red, started exploring new areas around the year 1000. Baffin Island is thought to be Helluland, and the archaeological site at Tanfield Valley is thought to have been a trading post. The Saga of Erik the Red, 1880 translation into English by J. Sephton from the original Icelandic Eiríks saga rauða:

They sailed away from land; then to the Vestribygd and to Bjarneyjar (the Bear Islands). Thence they sailed away from Bjarneyjar with northerly winds. They were out at sea two half-days. Then they came to land, and rowed along it in boats, and explored it, and found there flat stones, many and so great that two men might well lie on them stretched on their backs with heel to heel. Polar-foxes were there in abundance. This land they gave name to, and called it Helluland (stone-land).

In September 2008, the Nunatsiaq News, a weekly newspaper, reported that Patricia Sutherland, who worked at the Canadian Museum of Civilization, had found archaeological remains of yarn and cordage [string], rat droppings, tally sticks, a carved wooden Dorset culture face mask depicting Caucasian features, and possible architectural remains, which indicated that European traders and possibly settlers had been on Baffin Island not later than 1000 CE. What the source of this Old World contact may have been is unclear and controversial; the newspaper article states:

Dating of some yarn and other artifacts, presumed to be left by Vikings on Baffin Island, have produced an age that predates the Vikings by several hundred years. So, as Sutherland said, if you believe that spinning was not an indigenous technique that was used in Arctic North America, then you have to consider the possibility that as "remote as it may seem," these finds may represent evidence of contact with Europeans prior to the Vikings' arrival in Greenland.

Sutherland's research eventually led to a 2012 announcement that whetstones had been found with remnants of alloys indicative of Viking presence. In 2018, Michele Hayeur Smith of Brown University, who specialises in the study of ancient textiles, wrote that she does not think the ancient Arctic people, the Dorset and Thule, needed to be taught how to spin yarn: "It's a pretty intuitive thing to do."

...the date received on Sample 4440b from Nanook clearly indicates that sinew was being spun and plied at least as early, if not earlier, than yarn at this site. We feel that the most parsimonious explanation of this data is that the practice of spinning hair and wool into plied yarn most likely developed naturally within this context of complex, indigenous, Arctic fiber technologies, and not through contact with European textile producers. [...] Our investigations indicate that Paleoeskimo (Dorset) communities on Baffin Island spun threads from the hair and also from the sinews of native terrestrial grazing animals, most likely musk ox and arctic hare, throughout the Middle Dorset period and for at least a millennium before there is any reasonable evidence of European activity in the islands of the North Atlantic or in the North American Arctic.

— Journal of Archaeological Science, August 2018

A long-running debate disputes whether the Vikings taught indigenous peoples in the Canadian Arctic how to spin yarn when the invaders arrived in the region around 1,000 years ago. The team found that some of the spun yarn dates back at least 2,000 years, long before the Vikings arrived in the area. This shows that the indigenous peoples in the Canadian Arctic developed yarn-spinning technologies without any help from the Vikings, the scientists said.

— Live Science, October 16, 2018

William W. Fitzhugh, director of the Arctic Studies Center at the Smithsonian Institution, and a senior scientist at the National Museum of Natural History, wrote that there is insufficient published evidence to support Sutherland's claims, and that the Dorset were using spun cordage by the 6th century. In 1992, Elizabeth Wayland Barber wrote that a piece of three-ply yarn that dates to the Paleolithic era, that ended about 10,000 BP, was found at the Lascaux caves in France. This yarn consisted of three s-twist strands that were z-plied, much like the way a three-ply yarn is made now, the Baffin Island yarn was a simple two-ply yarn. The eight sod buildings and artifacts found in the 1960s at L'Anse aux Meadows, located on the northern tip of Newfoundland Island, remains the only confirmed Norse site in North America outside of those found in Greenland.

== Demographics and administration ==
Location of communities on Baffin Island

Baffin Island is part of the Qikiqtaaluk Region. The population of Baffin Island at the 2021 Canadian census was 13,039, giving a population density of 0.03/km^{2} (0.07/sq mi). The population accounts for 67.37 per cent of the 19,355 people in the Qikiqtaaluk Region, 56.51 per cent of the population of the Arctic Archipelago, and 35.38 per cent of the population of Nunavut.

As of the 2016 Canadian census the majority, 74.06 per cent, were Indigenous peoples and 25.83 per cent were non-Indigenous. This compares to 88.85 per cent and 14.12 per cent Indigenous and non-Indigenous people for Nunavut as a whole. This lower percentage of Indigenous peoples on Baffin Island results from Iqaluit being 59.29 per cent Indigenous and 40.65 per cent non-Indigenous. Of the total population 72.17 per cent are Inuit, 0.92 per cent are First Nations, and 0.73 per cent are Métis. Except for a few First Nations people in Arctic Bay, all non-Inuit Indigenous peoples live in Iqaluit.

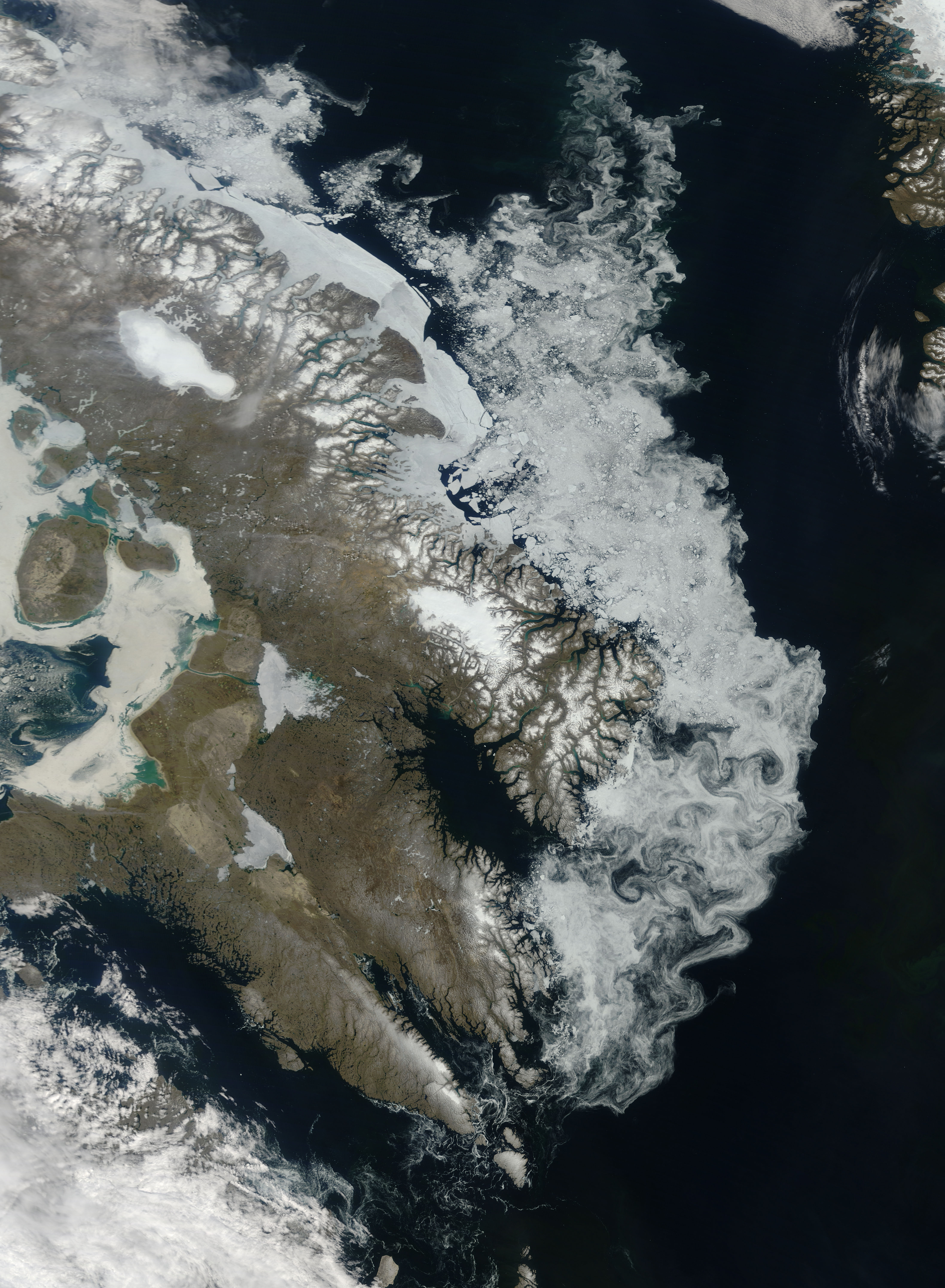
Sea ice off Baffin Island

Population figures
| City or hamlet | 2021 | 2016 | 2011 | 2006 | 2001 |
|---|---|---|---|---|---|
| Arctic Bay | 944 | 868 | 823 | 690 | 646 |
| Clyde River | 1,181 | 1,053 | 934 | 820 | 785 |
| Iqaluit | 7,429 | 7,740 | 6,699 | 6,184 | 5,236 |
| Kimmirut | 426 | 389 | 455 | 411 | 433 |
| Nanisivik | 0 | 0 | 0 | 0 | 77 |
| Pangnirtung | 1,504 | 1,481 | 1,425 | 1,325 | 1,276 |
| Pond Inlet | 1,555 | 1,617 | 1,549 | 1,315 | 1,220 |

The hamlets of Kinngait (population: 1,396) and Qikiqtarjuaq (population: 593) do not lie on Baffin Island proper. Kinngait is situated on Dorset Island, which is located a few kilometres from the south eastern tip of the Foxe Peninsula. Similarly, Qikiqtarjuaq is situated on Broughton Island, which is located near the northern coast of the Cumberland Peninsula. The Mary River Mine, an iron ore mine with an estimated 21-year life, at Mary River, may include building a railway and a port to transport the ore. This may create a temporary mining community there.

== Wildlife ==
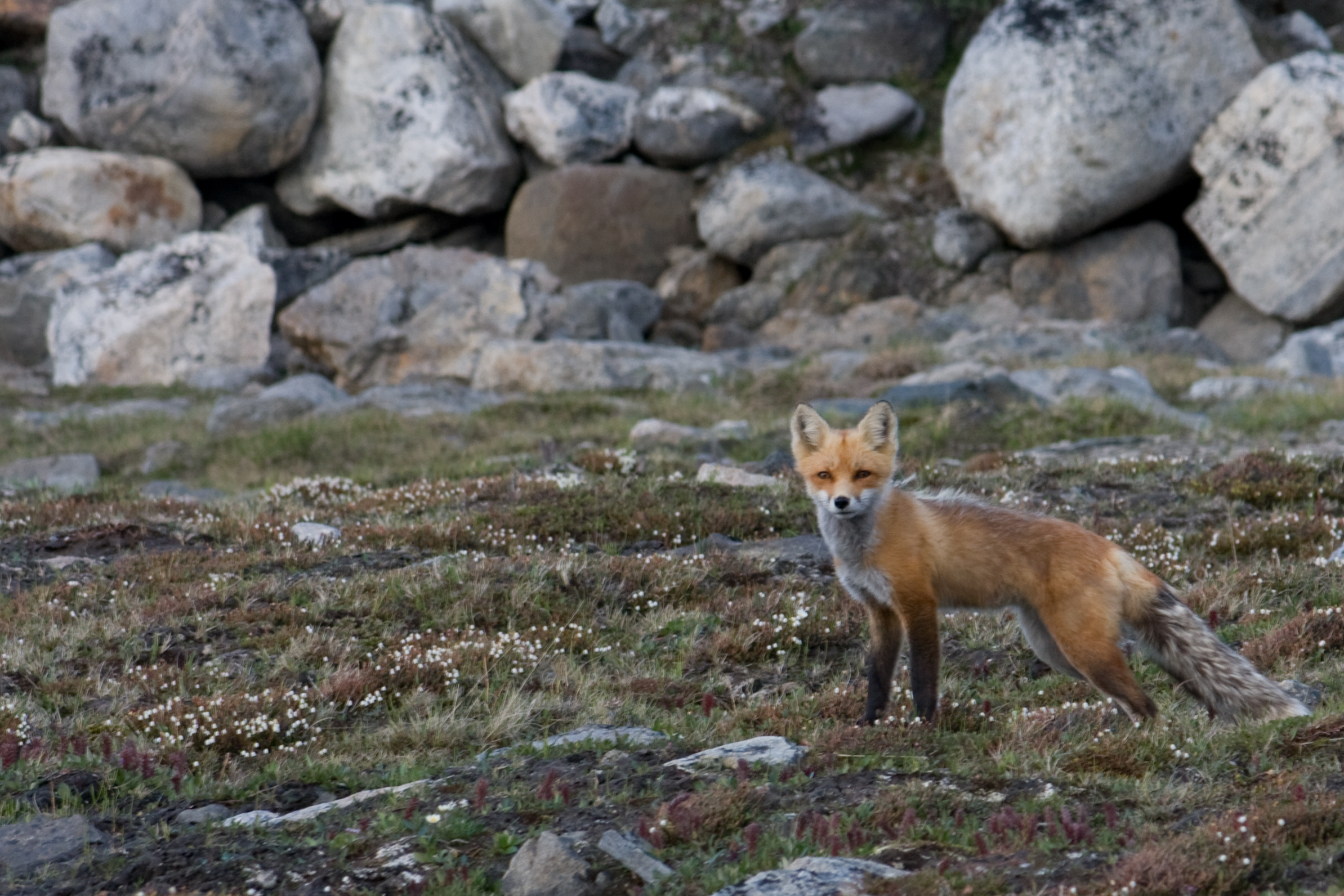
A Baffin Island red fox

Baffin Island is home to the Isulijarniq Migratory Bird Sanctuary and the Bowman Bay Wildlife Sanctuary. The Isulijarniq Migratory Bird Sanctuary, named for J. Dewey Soper, is located on the western side of Baffin Island from Bowman Bay to the Koukdjuak River. It is an 8,159 km^{2} (3,150 sq mi) area that was classified a wetland of international importance via the Ramsar Convention on May 24, 1982. It is home of the world's largest goose colony and supports a large number of barren-ground caribou.

The Bowman Bay Wildlife Sanctuary is also located on the western side of Baffin Island near Bowman Bay in the Great Plain of the Koukdjuak. It is 1,079 km^{2} (417 sq mi) and is classified as Category IV (Habitat/Species Management Area) under the International Union for Conservation of Nature.

Baffin Island has both year-round and summer visitor wildlife. On land, examples of year-round wildlife are barren-ground caribou, polar bear, Arctic fox, red fox, Arctic hare, lemming, and Baffin Island wolf.

Barren-ground caribou herds migrate in a limited range from northern Baffin Island down to the southern part in winter, even to the Frobisher Bay peninsula, next to Resolution Island, then migrating back north in the summer. In 2012, a survey of caribou herds found that the local population was only about 5,000, a decrease of as much as 95% from the 1990s.

Arctic hares are found throughout Baffin Island. Their fur is pure white in winter and moults to a scruffy dark grey in summer. Arctic hares and lemmings are an important food source for Arctic and red foxes and Arctic wolves.

Lemmings are also found throughout the island, and are a major food source for foxes, wolves and the snowy owl. In the winter, lemmings dig complicated tunnel systems through the snow drifts to get to their food supply of dry grasses and lichens.

=== Predators ===
Polar bears can be found all along the coast of Baffin Island but are most prevalent where the sea ice takes the form of pack ice, where their major food sources—ringed seals (jar seal) and bearded seals—live. Polar bears mate approximately every year, bearing one to three cubs around March. Female polar bears may travel 10–20 kilometres (6.2–12.4 miles) inland to find a large snow bank where they dig a den in which to spend the winter and later give birth. The polar bear population here is one of 19 genetically distinct demes of the circumpolar region.

Red foxes can be found predominantly in the southernmost areas of Baffin Island, away from the harshest of winter weather, though some individuals may forage and explore elsewhere. The Arctic foxes can usually be found where polar bears venture on the fast ice close to land in their search for seals. Arctic foxes are scavengers and often follow polar bears to get their leavings. They also are known to take ground-nesting birds and their eggs and chicks, such as ducks, geese, ptarmigan, seagulls, shorebirds and even snowy owls, on occasion. On Baffin Island, Arctic foxes are sometimes trapped by Inuit, but there is no longer a robust fur industry.

Baffin Island wolves, a grey wolf subspecies, are also year-round residents of Baffin Island. Unlike the grey wolf in southern climes, wolves in the Arctic often have smaller social networks, due to the barren landscape and minimal resources, thus resulting in unique hierarchies when compared with wolves found further south. For example, Arctic wolves often do not hunt in packs, although a male-female pair may hunt together.

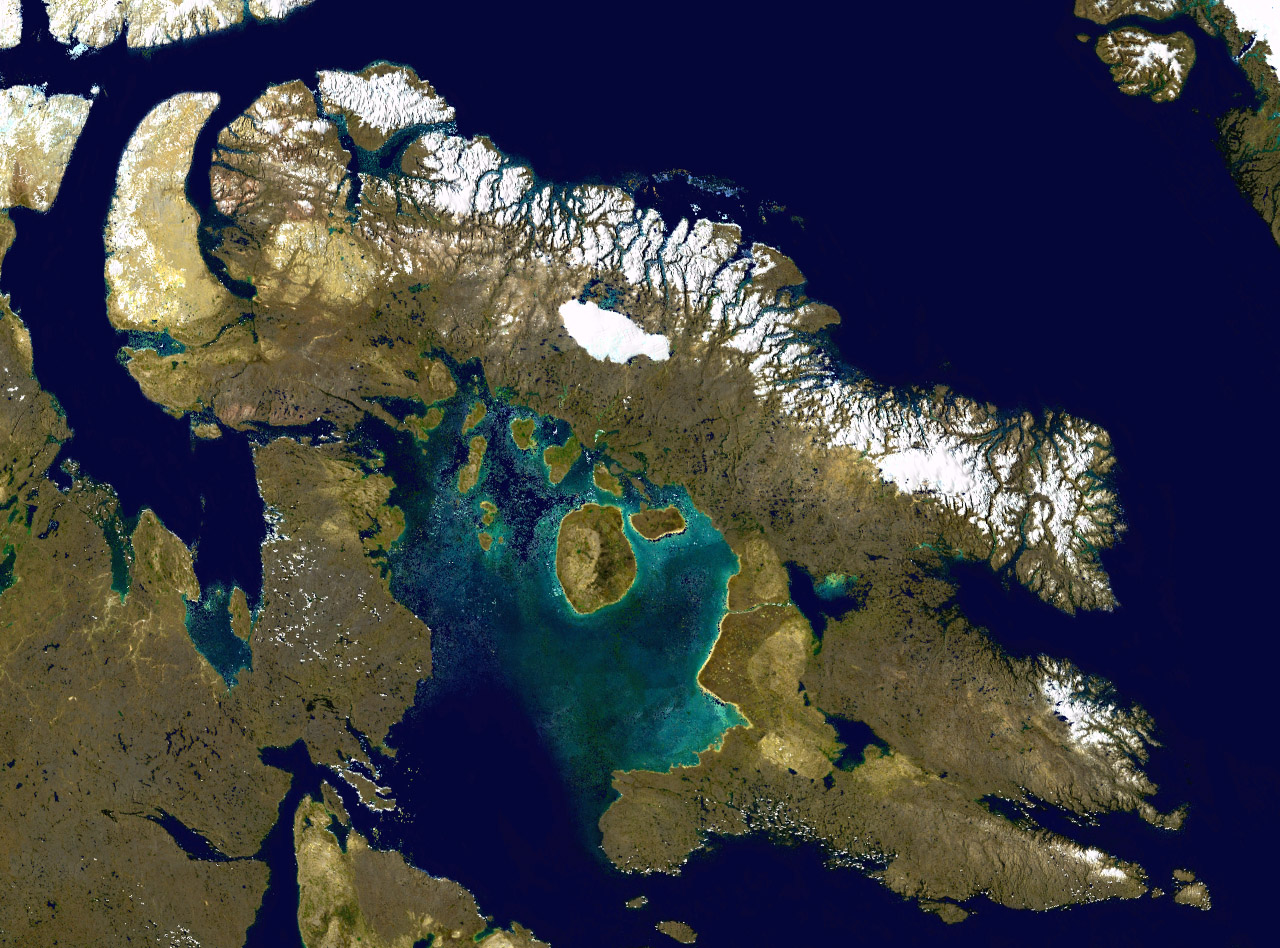
Satellite image of Baffin Island

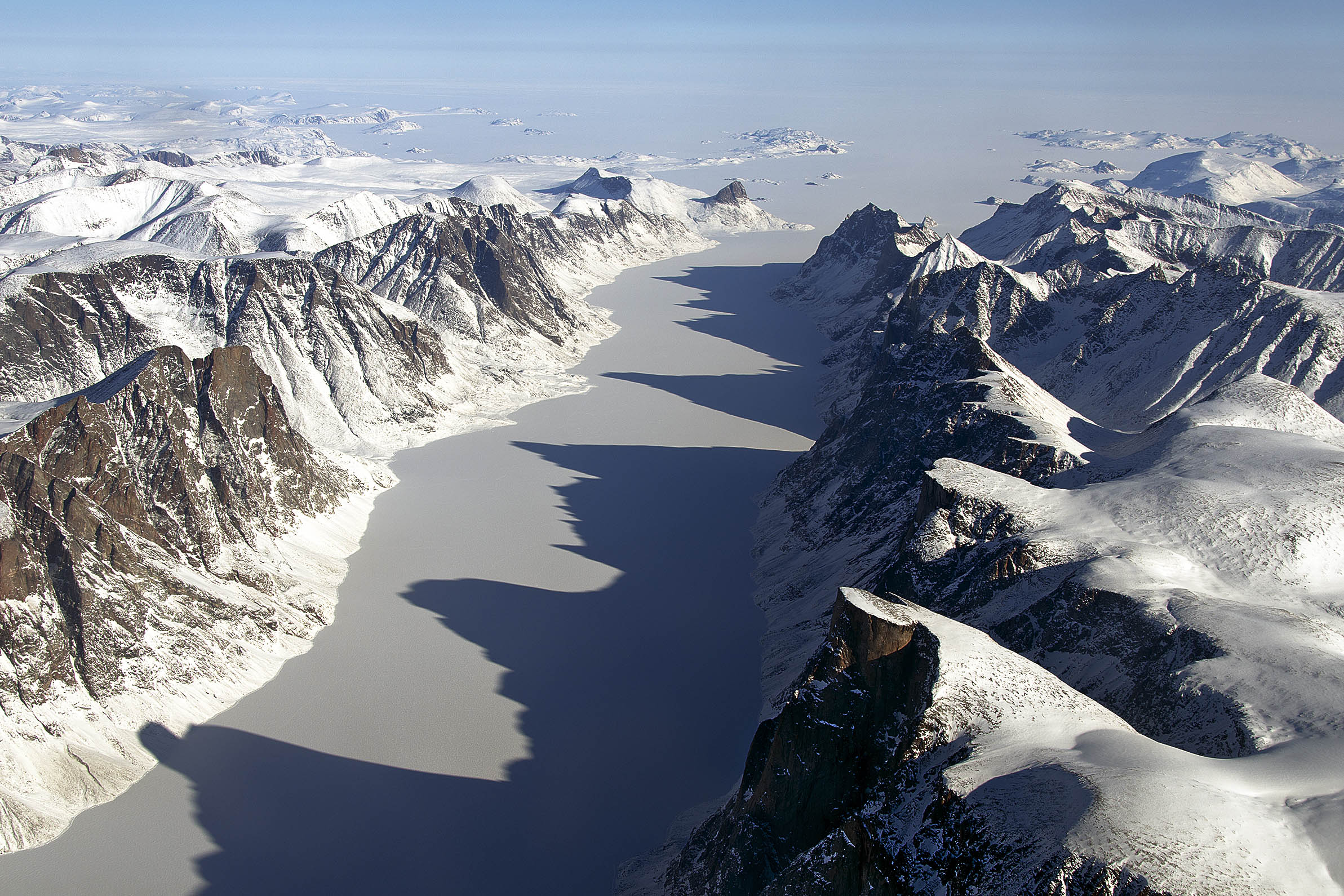
An ice-covered fjord on Baffin Island, with Davis Strait in the background

=== Birds ===
Nesting birds are summer land visitors to Baffin Island. Baffin Island is one of the major nesting destinations from the Eastern and Mid-West flyways for many species of migrating birds. Waterfowl include eiders, Canada goose, snow goose, cackling goose, and brant goose (brent goose). Shore birds include the phalarope, various waders (commonly called sandpipers), murres including Brünnich's guillemot, and plovers. Gull species also nest on Baffin Island and they include Sabine's gull, glaucous gull, herring gull and ivory gull.

Long-range travellers include the Arctic tern, which migrates from Antarctica every spring. The varieties of water birds that nest here include coots, loons, mallards, and many other duck species.

=== Marine mammals ===
In the water (and under the ice), the main year-round species is the ringed seal subspecies, the Arctic ringed seal. It lives offshore within 8 km (5.0 mi) of land. In winter, it makes a number of breathing holes in the ice, up to 2 m (6 ft 7 in) thick. It visits each one often to keep the hole open and free from ice. In March, when a female is ready to whelp, she will enlarge one of the breathing holes that has snow over it, creating a small "igloo" where she whelps one or two pups. Within three weeks the pups are in the water and swimming. In summer, some ringed seals keep to a narrow territory about 3 km (1.9 mi) along the shoreline but may move out into the open water. In the spring they spend more time on the surface of the ice.

==== Summer visitors ====
Water species that visit Baffin Island in the summer include harp seals (or saddle-backed seals), which migrate from major breeding grounds off the coast of Labrador and the southeast coast of Greenland to Baffin Island for the summer. Migrating at speeds of 15–20 kilometres per hour (9.3–12.4 miles per hour), they all come up to breathe at the same time, then dive and swim up to 1–2 km (0.62–1.24 mi) before surfacing again. They migrate in large pods consisting of a hundred or more seals to within 1–8 km (0.62–4.97 mi) of the shoreline, which they then follow, feeding on crustaceans and fish.

Walruses, which do not migrate far off land in the winter. They merely follow the fast ice, or ice that is solidly attached to land, and stay ahead of it as the ice hardens further and further out to sea. As winter progresses, they will always remain where there is open water free of ice. When the ice melts, they move in to land and can be found basking on rocks close to shore. One of the largest walrus herds can be found in the Foxe Basin on the western side of Baffin Island.

Beluga or white whales migrate along the coast of Baffin Island; some head north to the feeding grounds in the Davis Strait between Greenland and Baffin Island, or into the Hudson Strait or any of the bays and estuaries in between. Usually travelling in pods of two or more, they can often be found very close to shore (100 m [330 ft] or less). They come up to breathe every 30 seconds or so as they make their way along the coastline eating crustaceans.

Narwhals, which are known for the males' long, spiralling single tusk, can also be found along the coast of Baffin Island in the summer. Much like their beluga cousins, they may be found in pairs or even in a large pod of ten or more males, females and newborns. They also can be often found close to the shoreline, gracefully pointing their tusks skyward as they come up for air.

The largest summer visitor to Baffin Island is the bowhead whale. Found throughout the Arctic range, one group of bowhead whales is known to migrate to the Foxe Basin, a bay on the western side of Baffin Island.

== Climate ==
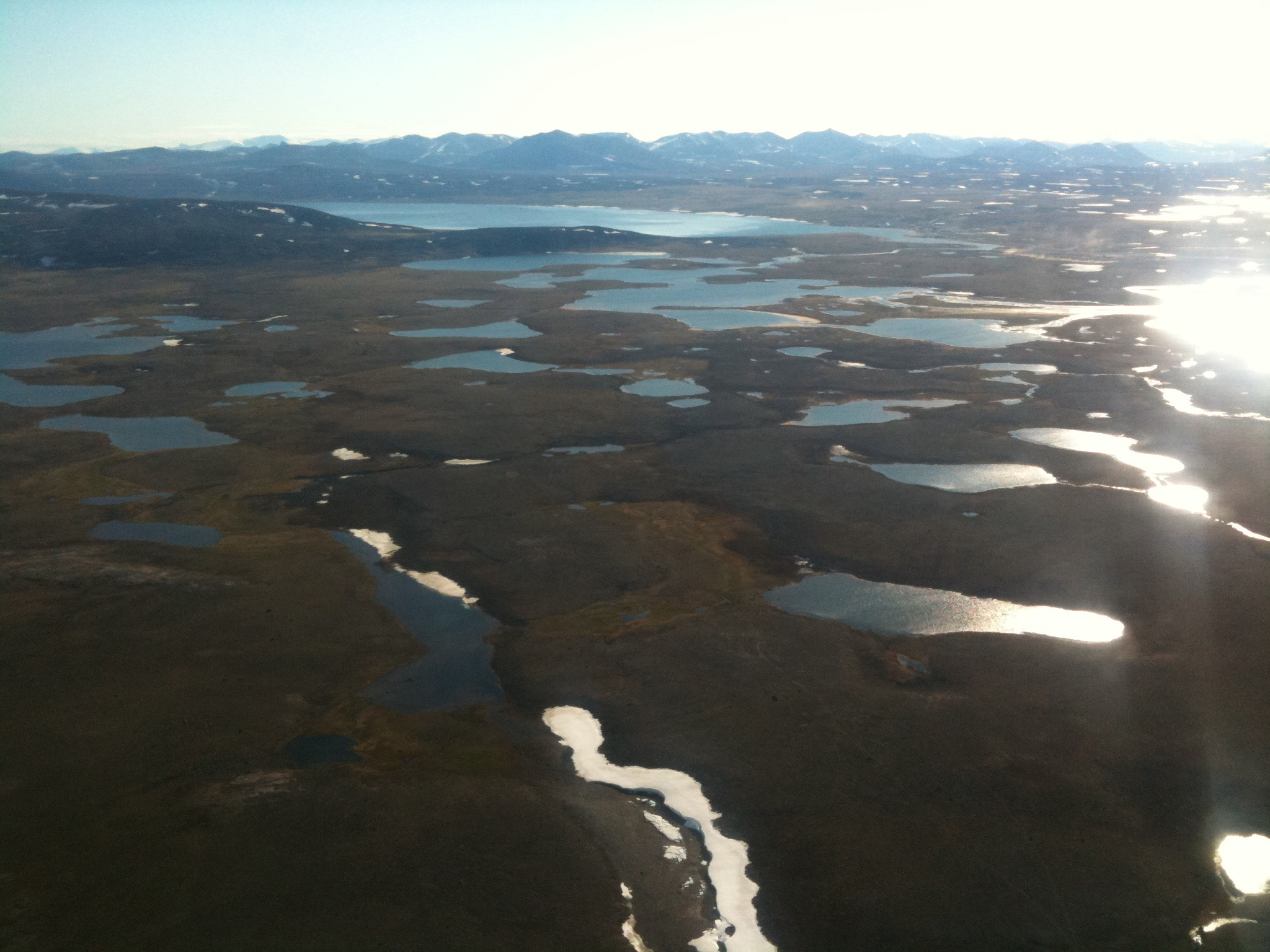
A view of Baffin Island

Baffin Island lies in the path of a generally northerly airflow all year round, so, like much of northeastern Canada, it has an extremely cold climate. This brings very long, cold winters and foggy, cloudy summers, which have helped to add to the remoteness of the island. Spring thaw arrives much later than normal for a position straddling the Arctic Circle: around early June at Iqaluit in the south-east but around early- to mid-July on the north coast where glaciers run right down to sea level. Snow, even heavy snow, can occur at any time of the year, although it is least likely in July and early August. Average annual temperatures at Iqaluit are around −9.5 °C (14.9 °F), compared with around 5 °C (41 °F) in Reykjavík, (Note: Reykjavík, 64°08′N 21°56′W) which is at a similar latitude.

Sea ice surrounds the island for most of the year and only disappears completely from the north coast for short, unpredictable periods from mid- to late June until the end of September.

Most of Baffin Island lies north of the Arctic Circle—all communities from Pangnirtung northwards have polar night in winter and midnight sun in summer. The eastern community of Clyde River has twilight instead of night from April 26 until May 13, continuous sunlight for 2 1/2 months from May 14 to July 28, then twilight instead of night from July 29 until August 16. This gives the community just over 3 1/2 months without true night. In the winter, the sun sets on November 22 and does not rise again until January 19 of the next year. Pond Inlet has civil twilight from December 16 to December 26. However, there is twilight for at least 4 hours per day, unlike places such as Eureka.

Like most of Nunavut and the Canadian Arctic, Baffin Island has a tundra climate (Köppen climate classification ET), although the highest ice caps have an ice cap climate (EF). The sea is frozen for most of the year, and only a few months are above freezing. There can be seasonal lag in spring.

The Barnes Ice Cap, in the middle of the island, has been retreating since at least the early 1960s, when the Geographical Branch of the then Department of Mines and Technical Surveys sent a three-man survey team to the area to measure isostatic rebound and cross-valley features of the Isortoq River. Although in the 1970s parts of Baffin Island failed to have the usual ice-free period in the summer.

Climate tables from south to north:

Climate data for Iqaluit (Iqaluit Airport) WMO ID: 71909; coordinates 63°45′N 68°33′W; elevation: 33.5 m (110 ft); 1991–2020 normals, extremes 1946–present
| Month | Jan | Feb | Mar | Apr | May | Jun | Jul | Aug | Sep | Oct | Nov | Dec | Year |
|---|---|---|---|---|---|---|---|---|---|---|---|---|---|
| Record high humidex | 3.3 | 5.2 | 4.3 | 6.8 | 13.3 | 21.7 | 27.8 | 27.6 | 18.8 | 8.6 | 4.8 | 3.4 | 27.8 |
| Record high °C (°F) | 3.9 (39.0) | 5.7 (42.3) | 4.2 (39.6) | 7.2 (45.0) | 13.3 (55.9) | 22.7 (72.9) | 26.8 (80.2) | 25.5 (77.9) | 18.4 (65.1) | 9.1 (48.4) | 5.6 (42.1) | 3.8 (38.8) | 26.8 (80.2) |
| Mean daily maximum °C (°F) | −22.0 (−7.6) | −22.9 (−9.2) | −17.6 (0.3) | −8.9 (16.0) | −0.3 (31.5) | 7.0 (44.6) | 12.0 (53.6) | 11.1 (52.0) | 5.6 (42.1) | −0.5 (31.1) | −7.5 (18.5) | −14.7 (5.5) | −4.9 (23.2) |
| Daily mean °C (°F) | −26.0 (−14.8) | −27.0 (−16.6) | −22.4 (−8.3) | −13.5 (7.7) | −3.2 (26.2) | 3.9 (39.0) | 8.1 (46.6) | 7.5 (45.5) | 2.9 (37.2) | −3.2 (26.2) | −11.1 (12.0) | −18.9 (−2.0) | −8.6 (16.5) |
| Mean daily minimum °C (°F) | −29.9 (−21.8) | −31.0 (−23.8) | −27.2 (−17.0) | −18.1 (−0.6) | −6.1 (21.0) | 0.7 (33.3) | 4.2 (39.6) | 3.8 (38.8) | 0.2 (32.4) | −5.8 (21.6) | −14.7 (5.5) | −23.0 (−9.4) | −12.2 (10.0) |
| Record low °C (°F) | −45.0 (−49.0) | −49.0 (−56.2) | −44.7 (−48.5) | −34.2 (−29.6) | −26.1 (−15.0) | −10.2 (13.6) | −2.8 (27.0) | −2.5 (27.5) | −12.8 (9.0) | −27.1 (−16.8) | −36.2 (−33.2) | −43.4 (−46.1) | −49.0 (−56.2) |
| Record low wind chill | −65.5 | −66.4 | −62.1 | −53.1 | −36.0 | −18.8 | −7.2 | −8.6 | −18.6 | −42.9 | −56.8 | −60.1 | −66.4 |
| Average precipitation mm (inches) | 16.3 (0.64) | 14.0 (0.55) | 21.4 (0.84) | 22.7 (0.89) | 21.0 (0.83) | 48.7 (1.92) | 39.8 (1.57) | 61.7 (2.43) | 50.8 (2.00) | 30.2 (1.19) | 18.5 (0.73) | 16.2 (0.64) | 361.2 (14.22) |
| Average rainfall mm (inches) | 0.4 (0.02) | 0.1 (0.00) | 0.0 (0.0) | 0.0 (0.0) | 3.3 (0.13) | 46.1 (1.81) | 44.4 (1.75) | 65.5 (2.58) | 43.9 (1.73) | 12.3 (0.48) | 0.7 (0.03) | 0.0 (0.0) | 216.6 (8.53) |
| Average snowfall cm (inches) | 19.4 (7.6) | 15.1 (5.9) | 20.6 (8.1) | 23.8 (9.4) | 23.0 (9.1) | 3.8 (1.5) | 0.0 (0.0) | 0.1 (0.0) | 8.5 (3.3) | 21.1 (8.3) | 25.9 (10.2) | 28.8 (11.3) | 190.0 (74.8) |
| Average precipitation days (≥ 0.2 mm) | 12.1 | 10.7 | 12.4 | 12.8 | 10.6 | 12.3 | 12.4 | 14.3 | 15.7 | 13.2 | 12.5 | 12.8 | 151.5 |
| Average rainy days (≥ 0.2 mm) | 0.06 | 0.06 | 0.06 | 0.06 | 1.7 | 10.7 | 13.1 | 14.8 | 13.2 | 3.8 | 0.24 | 0.0 | 57.7 |
| Average snowy days (≥ 0.2 cm) | 10.1 | 8.8 | 8.7 | 9.6 | 8.7 | 2.1 | 0.06 | 0.12 | 3.7 | 9.8 | 11.9 | 12.7 | 86.3 |
| Average relative humidity (%) (at 1500 LST) | 68.1 | 67.6 | 68.9 | 74.6 | 77.3 | 74.6 | 72.9 | 73.5 | 75.2 | 78.7 | 78.4 | 74.3 | 73.7 |
| Mean monthly sunshine hours | 32.4 | 94.0 | 172.2 | 216.5 | 180.5 | 200.2 | 236.8 | 156.8 | 87.9 | 51.4 | 35.6 | 12.6 | 1,476.8 |
| Percentage possible sunshine | 18.5 | 39.0 | 47.4 | 48.2 | 31.9 | 32.5 | 39.3 | 31.0 | 22.4 | 16.8 | 17.7 | 8.9 | 29.5 |
| Average ultraviolet index | 0 | 0 | 1 | 2 | 4 | 4 | 4 | 3 | 2 | 1 | 0 | 0 | 2 |
Source: Environment and Climate Change Canada (sunshine 1981–2010 from ECCC) (ultraviolet index from Weather Atlas)

Climate data for Clyde River (Clyde River Airport) WMO ID: 71090; coordinates 70°29′10″N 68°31′00″W; elevation: 26.5 m (87 ft); 1991–2020 normals, extremes 1933–present
| Month | Jan | Feb | Mar | Apr | May | Jun | Jul | Aug | Sep | Oct | Nov | Dec | Year |
|---|---|---|---|---|---|---|---|---|---|---|---|---|---|
| Record high humidex | 2.2 | 1.7 | 0.1 | 7.2 | 8.5 | 16.1 | 23.6 | 20.7 | 14.4 | 8.1 | 1.7 | 1.7 | 23.6 |
| Record high °C (°F) | 3.3 (37.9) | 3.3 (37.9) | 0.2 (32.4) | 11.7 (53.1) | 8.9 (48.0) | 17.8 (64.0) | 22.2 (72.0) | 20.6 (69.1) | 14.6 (58.3) | 11.4 (52.5) | 6.7 (44.1) | 2.8 (37.0) | 22.2 (72.0) |
| Mean daily maximum °C (°F) | −24.2 (−11.6) | −25.1 (−13.2) | −22.0 (−7.6) | −13.4 (7.9) | −3.7 (25.3) | 3.8 (38.8) | 9.2 (48.6) | 8.2 (46.8) | 3.3 (37.9) | −2.9 (26.8) | −12.3 (9.9) | −19.0 (−2.2) | −8.2 (17.2) |
| Daily mean °C (°F) | −28.0 (−18.4) | −29.0 (−20.2) | −26.6 (−15.9) | −18.2 (−0.8) | −7.6 (18.3) | 1.0 (33.8) | 5.3 (41.5) | 5.0 (41.0) | 0.7 (33.3) | −6.3 (20.7) | −16.0 (3.2) | −23.0 (−9.4) | −11.9 (10.6) |
| Mean daily minimum °C (°F) | −31.8 (−25.2) | −32.8 (−27.0) | −31.2 (−24.2) | −23.0 (−9.4) | −11.3 (11.7) | −1.6 (29.1) | 1.6 (34.9) | 1.9 (35.4) | −1.6 (29.1) | −9.3 (15.3) | −19.6 (−3.3) | −26.8 (−16.2) | −15.5 (4.1) |
| Record low °C (°F) | −50.2 (−58.4) | −50.1 (−58.2) | −47.8 (−54.0) | −41.1 (−42.0) | −31.1 (−24.0) | −17.2 (1.0) | −6.8 (19.8) | −5.6 (21.9) | −16.1 (3.0) | −28.7 (−19.7) | −39.5 (−39.1) | −45.0 (−49.0) | −50.2 (−58.4) |
| Record low wind chill | −59.5 | −62.4 | −58.1 | −48.9 | −34.4 | −20.0 | −10.5 | −9.5 | −21.2 | −36.4 | −46.7 | −55.3 | −62.4 |
| Average precipitation mm (inches) | 10.4 (0.41) | 8.1 (0.32) | 11.9 (0.47) | 10.9 (0.43) | 15.0 (0.59) | 20.3 (0.80) | 25.0 (0.98) | 28.7 (1.13) | 37.9 (1.49) | 30.0 (1.18) | 18.4 (0.72) | 15.4 (0.61) | 231.9 (9.13) |
| Average rainfall mm (inches) | 0.0 (0.0) | 0.0 (0.0) | 0.0 (0.0) | 0.0 (0.0) | 0.5 (0.02) | 5.6 (0.22) | 14.5 (0.57) | 32.2 (1.27) | 10.2 (0.40) | 0.3 (0.01) | 0.0 (0.0) | 0.0 (0.0) | 63.3 (2.49) |
| Average snowfall cm (inches) | 10.6 (4.2) | 8.7 (3.4) | 8.4 (3.3) | 12.7 (5.0) | 16.5 (6.5) | 12.5 (4.9) | 6.6 (2.6) | 5.2 (2.0) | 27.7 (10.9) | 40.4 (15.9) | 28.2 (11.1) | 17.2 (6.8) | 194.7 (76.7) |
| Average precipitation days (≥ 0.2 mm) | 8.0 | 7.1 | 7.5 | 8.8 | 10.3 | 8.3 | 9.6 | 10.8 | 15.0 | 16.0 | 11.1 | 9.9 | 122.3 |
| Average rainy days (≥ 0.2 mm) | 0.0 | 0.0 | 0.0 | 0.0 | 0.3 | 1.6 | 6.6 | 9.1 | 3.8 | 0.3 | 0.1 | 0.0 | 21.8 |
| Average snowy days (≥ 0.2 cm) | 7.3 | 6.6 | 6.8 | 8.7 | 10.5 | 5.6 | 2.4 | 3.3 | 12.0 | 17.0 | 11.8 | 8.4 | 100.3 |
| Average relative humidity (%) (at 1500 LST) | 68.3 | 66.7 | 67.6 | 74.4 | 83.0 | 84.5 | 79.3 | 80.4 | 81.0 | 82.8 | 78.5 | 71.7 | 76.5 |
| Mean monthly sunshine hours | 0.0 | 56.1 | 175.6 | 253.3 | 264.1 | 273.4 | 279.0 | 161.6 | 83.9 | 45.5 | 0.0 | 0.0 | 1,592.5 |
| Percentage possible sunshine | 0.0 | 28.6 | 48.8 | 51.8 | 37.9 | 38.0 | 37.6 | 28.0 | 20.7 | 16.4 | 0.0 | 0.0 | 34.2 |
Source: Environment and Climate Change Canada (rain/rain days, snow/snow days, sun 1981–2010 [does not include total precipitation)

Climate data for Pond Inlet (Pond Inlet Airport) WMO ID: 71095; coordinates 72°41′22″N 77°58′08″W; elevation: 61.6 m (202 ft); 1991–2020 normals (Note: Composite data from Pond Inlet Climate: WMO ID: 71576; coordinates 72°41′36″N 77°57′27″W; elevation: 64.7 m (212 ft) and Pond Inlet AWOS WMO ID: 71095; coordinates 72°41′22″N 77°58′08″W; elevation: 61.6 m (202 ft). Sun from 1981–2010 station data), extremes 1975–present
| Month | Jan | Feb | Mar | Apr | May | Jun | Jul | Aug | Sep | Oct | Nov | Dec | Year |
|---|---|---|---|---|---|---|---|---|---|---|---|---|---|
| Record high humidex | 3.6 | −4.0 | −0.4 | 3.9 | 9.4 | 17.9 | 22.9 | 19.9 | 13.2 | 6.2 | 1.4 | −0.5 | 22.9 |
| Record high °C (°F) | 3.7 (38.7) | −0.7 (30.7) | 0.7 (33.3) | 3.9 (39.0) | 12.1 (53.8) | 18.7 (65.7) | 22.3 (72.1) | 19.0 (66.2) | 14.3 (57.7) | 6.5 (43.7) | 2.3 (36.1) | −0.1 (31.8) | 22.3 (72.1) |
| Mean daily maximum °C (°F) | −28.9 (−20.0) | −29.7 (−21.5) | −25.7 (−14.3) | −16.6 (2.1) | −4.3 (24.3) | 5.9 (42.6) | 11.1 (52.0) | 8.7 (47.7) | 1.8 (35.2) | −5.5 (22.1) | −16.6 (2.1) | −23.6 (−10.5) | −10.3 (13.5) |
| Daily mean °C (°F) | −32.2 (−26.0) | −33.1 (−27.6) | −29.4 (−20.9) | −20.9 (−5.6) | −8.1 (17.4) | 3.0 (37.4) | 7.2 (45.0) | 5.6 (42.1) | −0.7 (30.7) | −8.5 (16.7) | −20.3 (−4.5) | −27.2 (−17.0) | −13.7 (7.3) |
| Mean daily minimum °C (°F) | −35.5 (−31.9) | −36.5 (−33.7) | −33.4 (−28.1) | −25.1 (−13.2) | −11.9 (10.6) | 0.0 (32.0) | 3.2 (37.8) | 2.3 (36.1) | −3.3 (26.1) | −11.5 (11.3) | −23.8 (−10.8) | −30.5 (−22.9) | −17.2 (1.0) |
| Record low °C (°F) | −49.8 (−57.6) | −53.9 (−65.0) | −49.0 (−56.2) | −40.2 (−40.4) | −28.4 (−19.1) | −14.0 (6.8) | −6.1 (21.0) | −11.9 (10.6) | −16.4 (2.5) | −30.1 (−22.2) | −39.5 (−39.1) | −45.5 (−49.9) | −53.9 (−65.0) |
| Record low wind chill | −64.8 | −68.5 | −60.3 | −51.4 | −36.2 | −20.7 | −6.7 | −17.8 | −25.0 | −42.0 | −51.6 | −58.6 | −68.5 |
| Average precipitation mm (inches) | 4.8 (0.19) | 5.9 (0.23) | 12.5 (0.49) | 12.1 (0.48) | 9.8 (0.39) | 15.7 (0.62) | 31.1 (1.22) | 40.1 (1.58) | 18.0 (0.71) | 24.0 (0.94) | 11.2 (0.44) | 10.0 (0.39) | 195.1 (7.68) |
| Average rainfall mm (inches) | 0.0 (0.0) | 0.0 (0.0) | 0.0 (0.0) | 0.0 (0.0) | 0.0 (0.0) | 11.9 (0.47) | 25.5 (1.00) | 32.0 (1.26) | 5.7 (0.22) | 0.0 (0.0) | 0.0 (0.0) | 0.0 (0.0) | 75.1 (2.96) |
| Average snowfall cm (inches) | 5.0 (2.0) | 4.1 (1.6) | 7.7 (3.0) | 13.8 (5.4) | 14.5 (5.7) | 2.9 (1.1) | 0.3 (0.1) | 2.9 (1.1) | 11.2 (4.4) | 28.6 (11.3) | 14.0 (5.5) | 15.6 (6.1) | 120.5 (47.4) |
| Average precipitation days (≥ 0.2 mm) | 5.3 | 5.2 | 6.8 | 7.0 | 6.4 | 6.4 | 8.4 | 9.5 | 8.7 | 12.8 | 8.6 | 8.7 | 93.6 |
| Average rainy days (≥ 0.2 mm) | 0.0 | 0.0 | 0.0 | 0.0 | 0.0 | 3.9 | 5.9 | 7.1 | 2.0 | 0.11 | 0.0 | 0.0 | 19.0 |
| Average snowy days (≥ 0.2 cm) | 3.4 | 2.9 | 4.9 | 5.1 | 4.8 | 1.7 | 0.05 | 0.74 | 3.8 | 8.6 | 5.6 | 6.4 | 47.8 |
| Average relative humidity (%) (at 1500 LST) | 66.7 | 66.9 | 67.0 | 72.1 | 77.0 | 73.6 | 70.9 | 74.3 | 76.2 | 81.3 | 74.2 | 69.8 | 72.5 |
| Mean monthly sunshine hours | — | — | 177.0 | 301.7 | 353.7 | 330.4 | 359.6 | 192.1 | 90.2 | 39.3 | — | — | — |
| Percentage possible sunshine | — | — | 49.5 | 59.0 | 48.4 | 45.9 | 48.3 | 30.7 | 21.9 | 15.0 | — | — | — |
Source: Environment and Climate Change Canada Canadian Climate Normals 1991–2020 (sun 1981–2010)

Climate data for Nanisivik (Nanisivik Airport) Climate ID: 2402730; coordinates 72°59′N 84°37′W; elevation: 641.9 m (2,106 ft); 1981–2010 normals
| Month | Jan | Feb | Mar | Apr | May | Jun | Jul | Aug | Sep | Oct | Nov | Dec | Year |
|---|---|---|---|---|---|---|---|---|---|---|---|---|---|
| Record high humidex | −3.0 | 1.2 | −2.2 | −1.2 | 6.5 | 14.5 | 18.4 | 16.7 | 9.0 | 1.2 | −6.3 | −1.3 | 18.4 |
| Record high °C (°F) | −2.0 (28.4) | 2.0 (35.6) | −3.0 (26.6) | −0.5 (31.1) | 7.0 (44.6) | 18.5 (65.3) | 18.2 (64.8) | 17.0 (62.6) | 8.5 (47.3) | 2.0 (35.6) | −6.0 (21.2) | −4.4 (24.1) | 18.5 (65.3) |
| Mean daily maximum °C (°F) | −26.8 (−16.2) | −27.2 (−17.0) | −24.7 (−12.5) | −16.6 (2.1) | −7.6 (18.3) | 2.2 (36.0) | 7.5 (45.5) | 3.9 (39.0) | −3.3 (26.1) | −11.3 (11.7) | −19.8 (−3.6) | −23.6 (−10.5) | −12.3 (9.9) |
| Daily mean °C (°F) | −29.6 (−21.3) | −29.9 (−21.8) | −27.6 (−17.7) | −19.8 (−3.6) | −10.3 (13.5) | −0.1 (31.8) | 5.1 (41.2) | 1.7 (35.1) | −5.0 (23.0) | −13.6 (7.5) | −22.5 (−8.5) | −26.3 (−15.3) | −14.8 (5.4) |
| Mean daily minimum °C (°F) | −32.4 (−26.3) | −32.3 (−26.1) | −30.1 (−22.2) | −22.9 (−9.2) | −13.0 (8.6) | −2.4 (27.7) | 2.7 (36.9) | −0.5 (31.1) | −6.7 (19.9) | −15.8 (3.6) | −24.9 (−12.8) | −28.7 (−19.7) | −17.2 (1.0) |
| Record low °C (°F) | −48.5 (−55.3) | −53.0 (−63.4) | −47.5 (−53.5) | −42.0 (−43.6) | −28.3 (−18.9) | −14.0 (6.8) | −6.0 (21.2) | −10.0 (14.0) | −19.5 (−3.1) | −35.0 (−31.0) | −39.4 (−38.9) | −45.5 (−49.9) | −53.0 (−63.4) |
| Record low wind chill | −62.9 | −72.3 | −67.0 | −54.8 | −39.4 | −24.9 | −12.8 | −21.0 | −30.3 | −50.0 | −53.5 | −60.6 | −72.3 |
| Average precipitation mm (inches) | 5.4 (0.21) | 5.1 (0.20) | 8.4 (0.33) | 10.9 (0.43) | 24.0 (0.94) | 25.2 (0.99) | 45.7 (1.80) | 45.0 (1.77) | 38.4 (1.51) | 37.4 (1.47) | 18.1 (0.71) | 7.3 (0.29) | 270.9 (10.67) |
| Average rainfall mm (inches) | 0.0 (0.0) | 0.0 (0.0) | 0.0 (0.0) | 0.0 (0.0) | 0.1 (0.00) | 6.7 (0.26) | 37.0 (1.46) | 29.2 (1.15) | 4.4 (0.17) | 0.0 (0.0) | 0.0 (0.0) | 0.0 (0.0) | 77.3 (3.04) |
| Average snowfall cm (inches) | 5.4 (2.1) | 5.2 (2.0) | 8.4 (3.3) | 11.2 (4.4) | 24.0 (9.4) | 17.7 (7.0) | 8.5 (3.3) | 15.0 (5.9) | 32.3 (12.7) | 38.2 (15.0) | 17.9 (7.0) | 7.5 (3.0) | 191.3 (75.3) |
| Average precipitation days (≥ 0.2 mm) | 4.4 | 4.6 | 6.2 | 5.7 | 9.6 | 8.8 | 12.4 | 12.6 | 13.3 | 14.2 | 8.4 | 6.3 | 106.5 |
| Average rainy days (≥ 0.2 mm) | 0.0 | 0.0 | 0.0 | 0.0 | 0.0 | 2.2 | 10.4 | 8.1 | 1.7 | 0.0 | 0.0 | 0.0 | 22.3 |
| Average snowy days (≥ 0.2 cm) | 4.4 | 4.6 | 6.2 | 5.8 | 9.6 | 7.1 | 3.0 | 5.4 | 12.1 | 14.3 | 8.5 | 6.4 | 87.3 |
Source: Environment and Climate Change Canada Canadian Climate Normals 1981–2010

== Economic resources ==
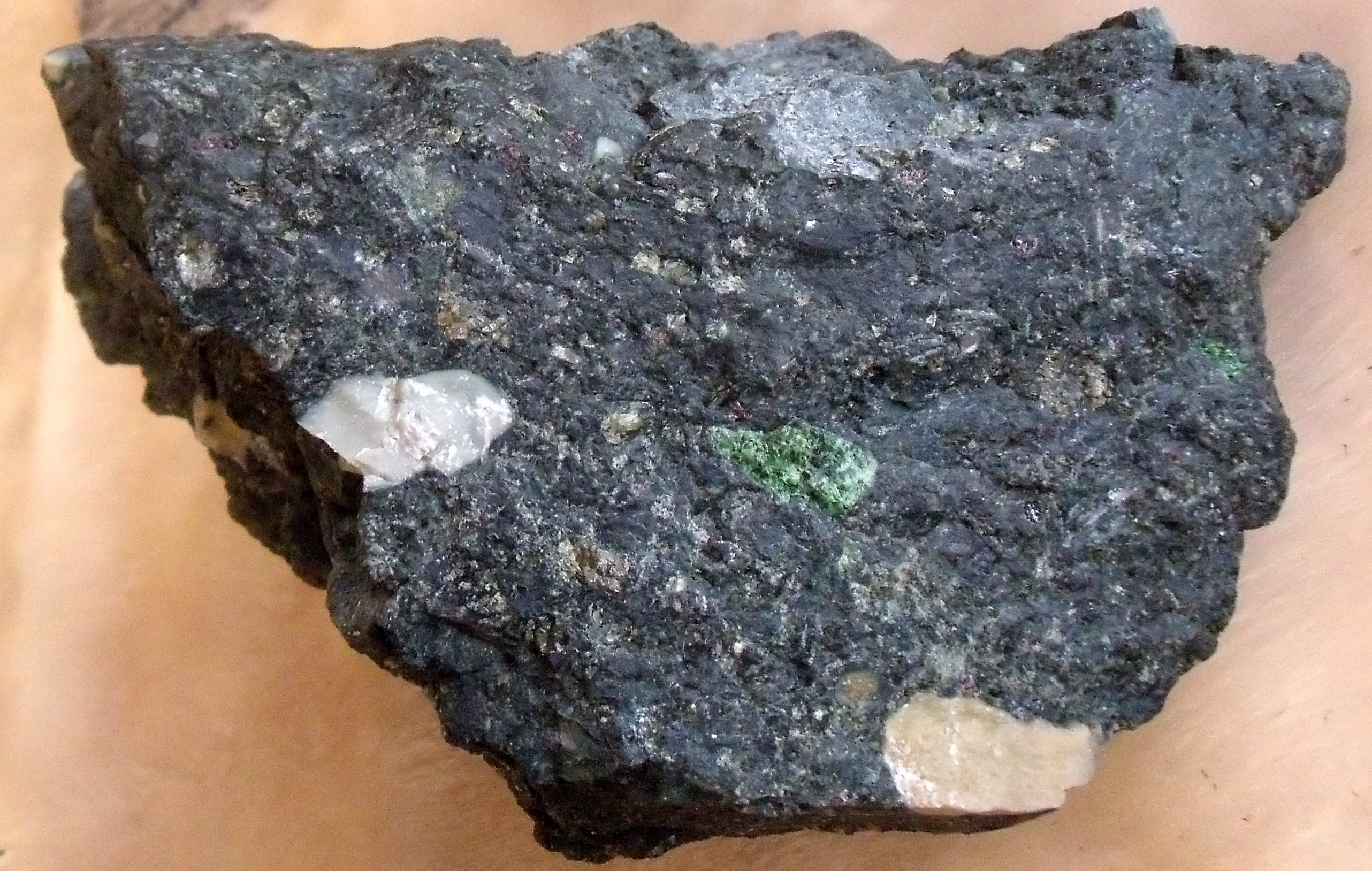
Kimberlite from the Cumberland Peninsula. In 2010 exploration company Peregrine Diamonds published interesting press releases. This hand-sized specimen contains several obvious green chrome diopside and abundant smaller wine-red pyrope garnet, which are colorful kimberlite indicator minerals (KIMs) for which a prospector looks.

The Hall Peninsula of southern Baffin Island includes the Chidliak Kimberlite Province, which had been found to include kimberlite pipes of diamond-bearing kimberlite.

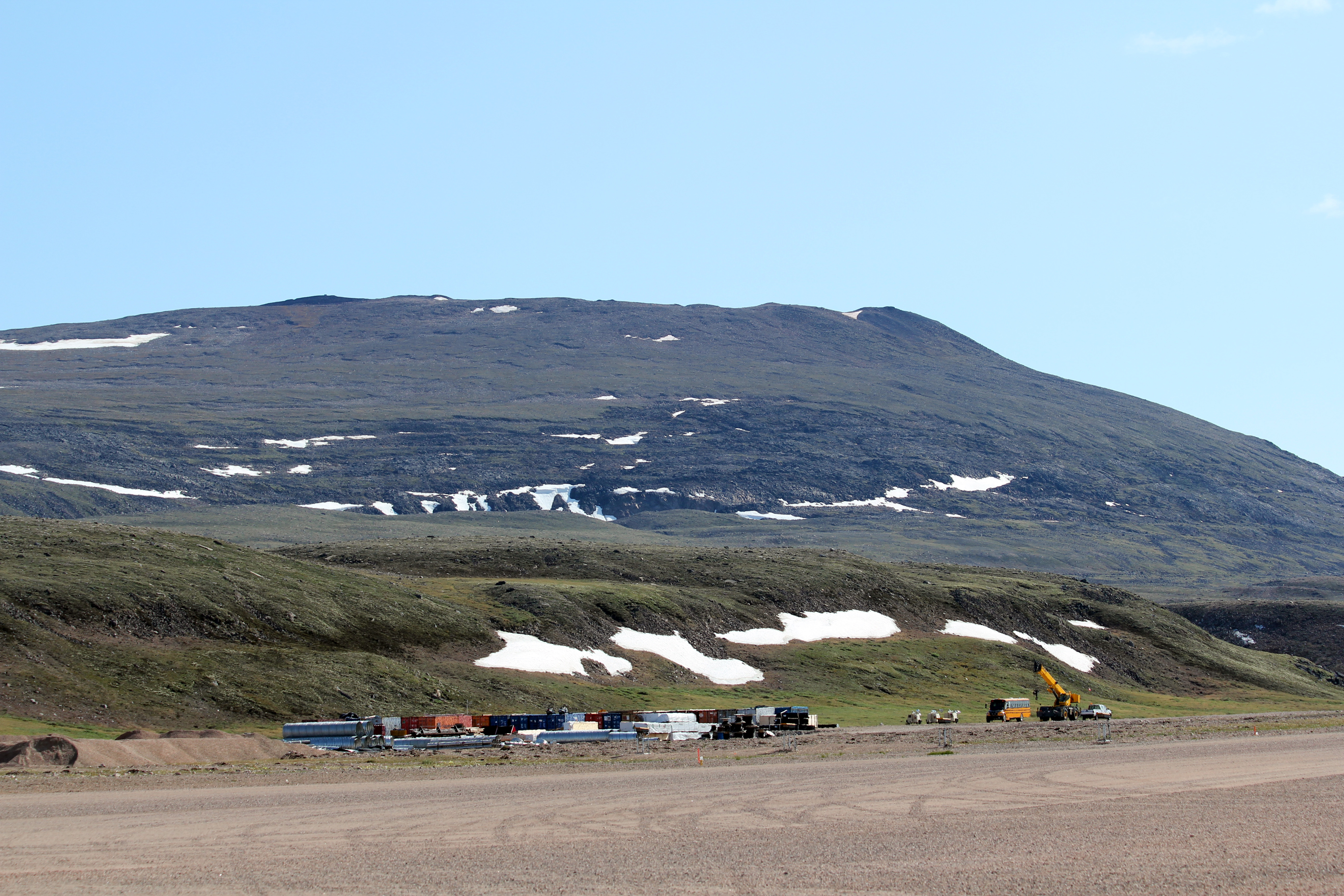
The Mary River mountain (2011) will be levelled like Arcelor Mittal's Mont Wright in Quebec.

The Mary River iron ore mine began operating with Baffinland in 2015, and shipped 4.2 million tonnes of iron ore in 2023. By 2020, the resource was controlled by Nunavut Iron and ArcelorMittal. Nanisivik Mine closed in September 2002.

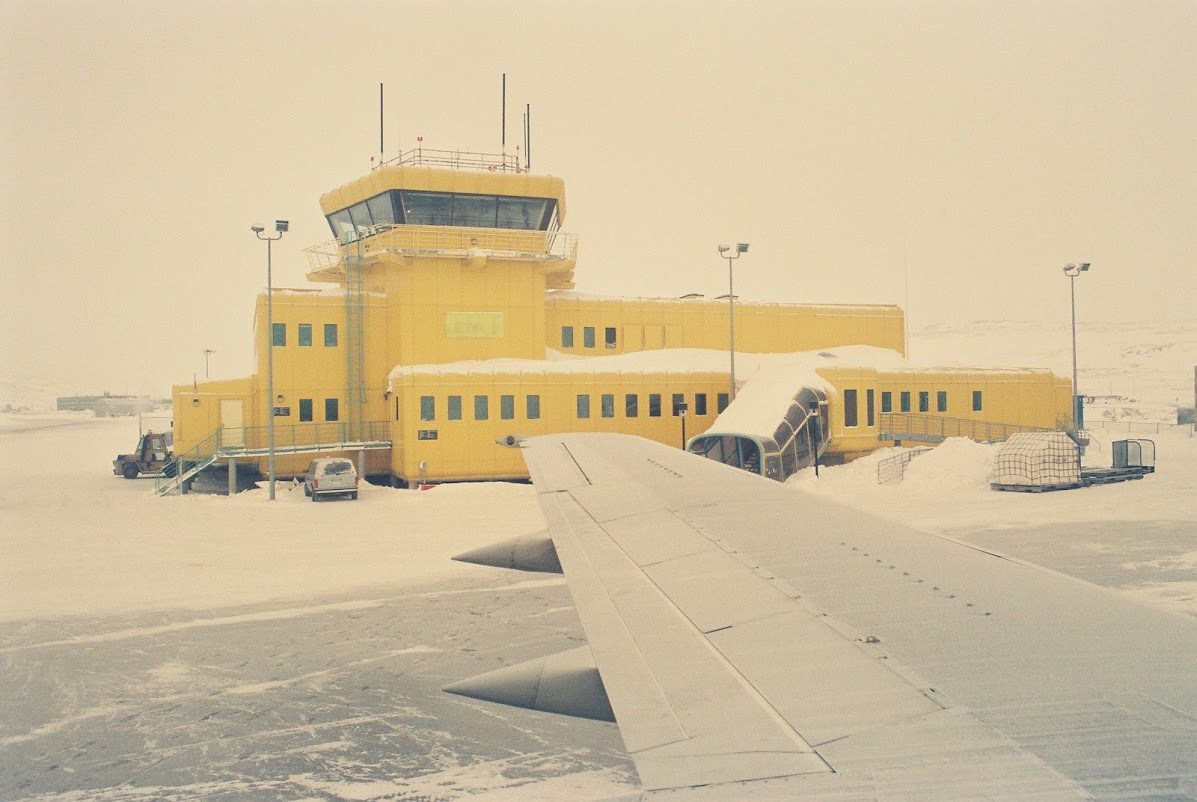
The old terminal at YFB airport

Iqaluit Airport (originally known as Frobisher Bay Airport), Arctic Bay Airport and Nanisivik Airport are three places where there have been domestic and international flights.

== In popular culture ==
The White Dawn is a 1974 film set on and filmed on Baffin Island. All performers except three Hollywood actors were Inuit who spoke their own language.

The opening scene of the 1977 James Bond film, The Spy Who Loved Me, featuring a cliff jump and parachute drop on skis, was filmed at Mount Asgard in Auyuittuq National Park on Baffin Island. The Polar Star Couloir, on Mount Beluga in the Kangiqtualuk Uqquqti (Sam Ford Fjord) area near Clyde River, is listed in Fifty Classic Ski Descents of North America as a backcountry skiing feature.

== See also ==
- Baffin coastal tundra
