= Foxe Basin =

Oceanic basin north of Hudson Bay, in Nunavut, Canada

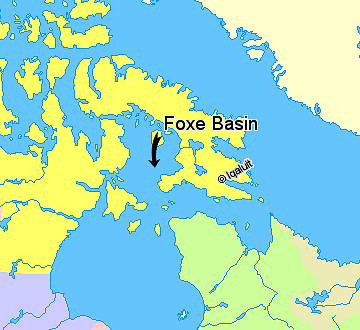
- Map indicating Foxe Basin
- Location: South of Baffin Island, Nunavut
- Coordinates: 65°55′50″N 77°55′10″W
- Type: Bay

Location
- Interactive map of Foxe Basin

Foxe Basin is a shallow oceanic basin north of Hudson Bay, in Nunavut, Canada, located between Baffin Island and the Melville Peninsula. For most of the year, it is blocked by sea ice (fast ice) and drift ice made up of multiple ice floes.

The nutrient-rich cold waters found in the basin are especially favourable to phytoplankton and the numerous islands within it are important bird habitats, including Sabine's gulls and many types of shorebirds. Bowhead whales migrate to the northern part of the basin each summer.

The basin takes its name from the English explorer Luke Foxe who entered the lower part in 1631.

== Waterway ==
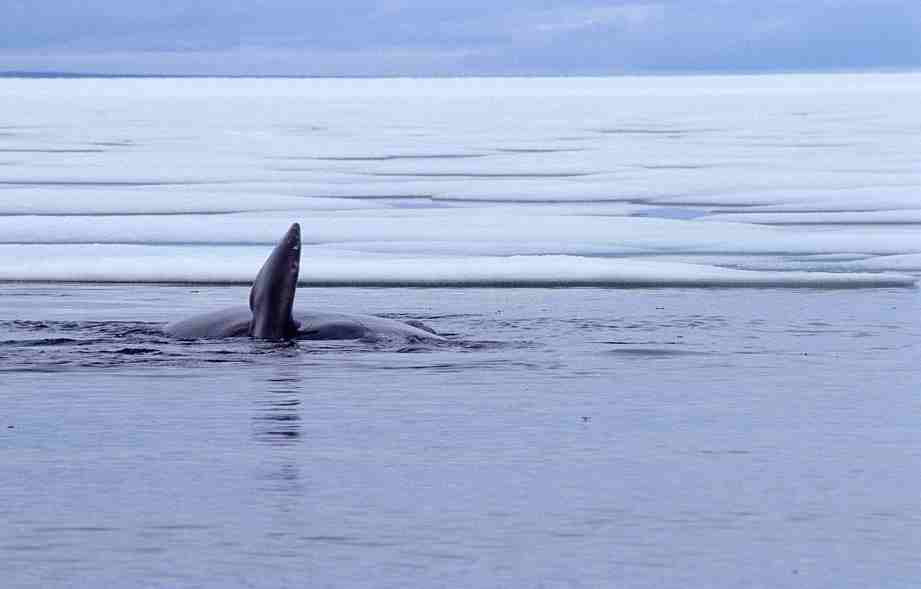
Bowhead whale (Balaena mysticetus), Foxe Basin, July 1999

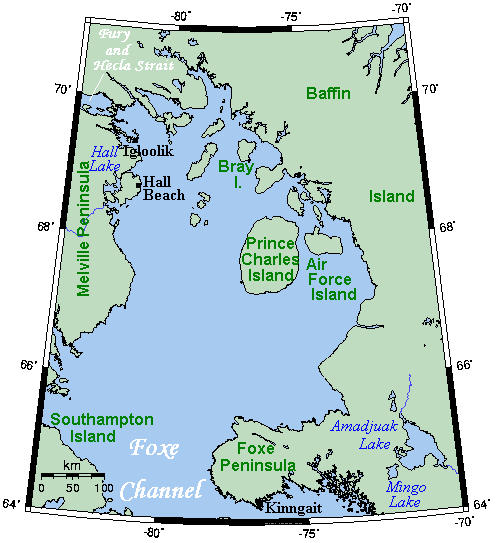
Map of Foxe Basin and environs

Foxe Basin is a broad, predominantly shallow depression, generally less than 100 m (330 ft) in depth, while to the south, depths of up to 400 m (1,300 ft) occur. The tidal range decreases from 5 m (16 ft) in the southeast to less than 1 m (3 ft 3 in) in the northwest. During much of the year, landfast ice dominates in the north, while pack ice prevails towards the south. Foxe Basin itself is rarely ice-free until September, open pack ice being common throughout the summer. Vigorous tidal currents and strong winds keep the ice pack in constant motion and contribute to the numerous polynyas and shore leads which are found throughout the region. This same motion, combined with the high sediment content of the water makes the sea ice of Foxe Basin dark and rough, easily distinguishable from other ice in the Canadian Arctic.

Foxe Basin is connected to the Gulf of Boothia via the narrow Fury and Hecla Strait, and to Hudson Bay and Hudson Strait via the wide Foxe Channel. It is also connected to Naujaat and Roes Welcome Sound via Frozen Strait.

== Coast ==
The terrain is rocky and rugged in the southern half of the region, and generally low-lying in the north. High cliffs are found across the southern portion of the region, where most of the seabirds nest. Coastal marshes and tidal flats up to 6.5 km (4.0 mi) in width are found in the vast lowland section of eastern Foxe Basin, as well as in the bays of Southampton Island.

== Wildlife ==
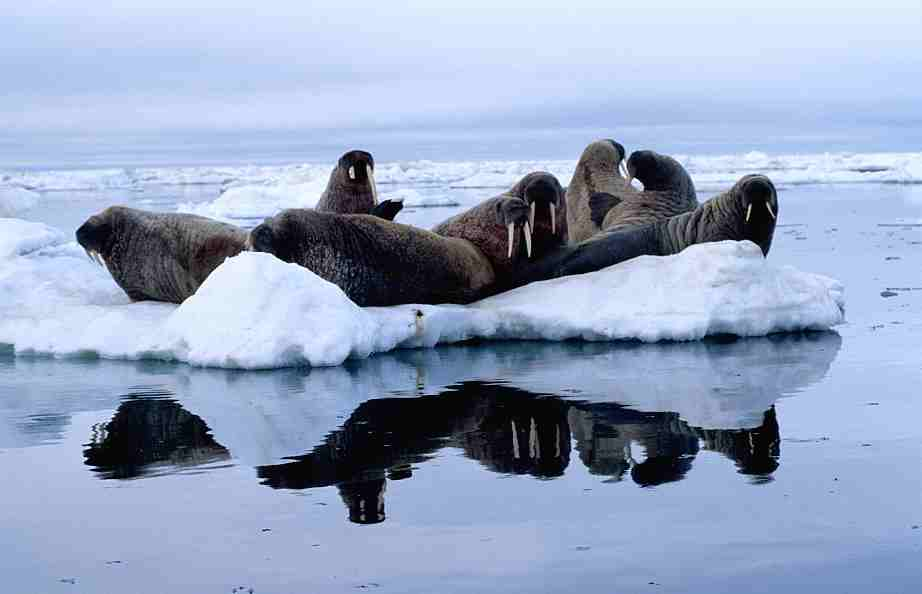
Atlantic walrus herd (Odobenus rosmarus rosmarus), on ice floe in Foxe Basin, July 1999

This is one of the little-known areas of the Canadian Arctic, though it is proving to be biologically rich and diverse. The numerous polynyas in northern Foxe Basin support high densities of bearded seals and the largest walrus herd in Canada (over 6,000 individuals). Ringed seal and polar bear are common, with north Southampton Island as one of the highest-density polar bear denning areas in Canada.

This area is also an important summering area for the bowhead whale, beluga whale and narwhal. Both bowhead whales and belugas winter in the waters of northeastern Hudson Bay. Bowheads were the only known baleen whales to occur in the Hudson Bay, but recently some other species of whale, such as humpback and minke, are confirmed to migrate into the waters as well.

The region is the main North American stronghold of the Sabine's gull, with some 10,000 pairs nesting here. Moderate numbers of black guillemots, Arctic terns and glaucous, herring and ivory gulls also breed here. The Great Plain of the Koukdjuak on Baffin Island is the world's largest goose nesting colony, with upwards of 1.5 million birds, 75 per cent of which are lesser snow geese and the remainder Canada and brant geese. Shorebirds and ducks are also abundant. Several hundred thousand thick-billed murres breed on the cliffs of Digges Sound and Coats Island to the south.

== Status ==
This region is not yet represented in the national marine conservation areas system. Studies to identify preliminary representative marine areas have yet to be undertaken.
