= Nunarijjait =

Island in Nunavut, Canada

- Location within Nunavut Location within Canada

Geography
- Location: Hudson Strait
- Coordinates: 64°19′N 76°00′W
- Archipelago: Arctic Archipelago

Administration
- Canada
- Nunavut: Nunavut
- Region: Qikiqtaaluk

Demographics
- Population: Uninhabited

Nunarijjait (Inuktitut syllabics: ᓄᓇᕆᔾᔭᐃᑦ) formerly Nunajuak Island is one of the uninhabited Canadian arctic islands located in the Hudson Strait, Nunavut, Canada. It is a Baffin Island offshore island in the Qikiqtaaluk Region. The elevation is approximately 1 m (3 ft 3 in) above sea level.

Kinngait, an Inuit hamlet on Dorset Island, is approximately 29.3 km (18.2 mi) away.
