= Dorset (disambiguation) =

Dorset is a ceremonial county in England.

Dorset may also refer to:

== Places ==
- Dorset Council (Australia), a local government area in Tasmania, Australia
- Cape Dorset, Nunavut, Canada
- Dorset, Ontario, a small community located between the touristic Muskoka and Haliburton regions of Ontario, Canada
- Dorset Island, one of the Canadian Arctic islands located in Hudson Strait, Nunavut, Canada
- Dorset (district), a unitary district within the ceremonial county of Dorset, England, created in 2019
- Dorset (UK Parliament constituency), United Kingdom
- Dorset, Minnesota, United States
- Dorset, Ohio, United States
- Dorset, Vermont, United States

== People ==
- Marion Dorset (1872–1935), medical scientist who developed immunization procedures for swine fever and father of the purple meat stamp
- Ray Dorset (born 1946), British musician

== Other uses ==
- Dorset culture, a prehistoric culture that preceded the Inuit in Arctic North America
- Dorset (sheep) (disambiguation), several breeds of sheep
- Marquess of Dorset, a title in the Peerage of England

== See also ==
- Dorset Council (disambiguation)
- Dorsett, a surname
