= Pudlat =

Pudlat is an Inuit surname. Notable people with this surname include:

- Elijah Pudlat Pootoogook (born 1943), Canadian artist
- Innukjuakju Pudlat (1913–1972), Canadian printmaker
- Mary Pudlat (1923–2001), Canadian artist
- Kenoayoak Pudlat, Canadian politician
- Pudlo Pudlat (1916–1992), Canadian artist
