= Gudmusson Island =

Island in Nunavut, Canada

- Location within Nunavut Location within Canada

Geography
- Location: Hudson Strait
- Coordinates: 64.30°N 75.82°W
- Archipelago: Arctic Archipelago

Administration
- Canada
- Nunavut: Nunavut
- Region: Qikiqtaaluk

Demographics
- Population: Uninhabited

Gudmusson Island is one of the Canadian arctic islands located in Hudson Strait, Nunavut, Canada. It is a Baffin Island offshore island in Qikiqtaaluk Region. Cape Dorset, an Inuit hamlet on Dorset Island, is approximately 37.7 km (23.4 mi) away.
