= Mallik Island =

Uninhabited island in Nunavut, Canada

- Location within Nunavut Location within Canada

Geography
- Location: Hudson Strait
- Coordinates: 64°14′N 76°38′W
- Archipelago: Arctic Archipelago

Administration
- Canada
- Nunavut: Nunavut
- Region: Qikiqtaaluk

Demographics
- Population: Uninhabited

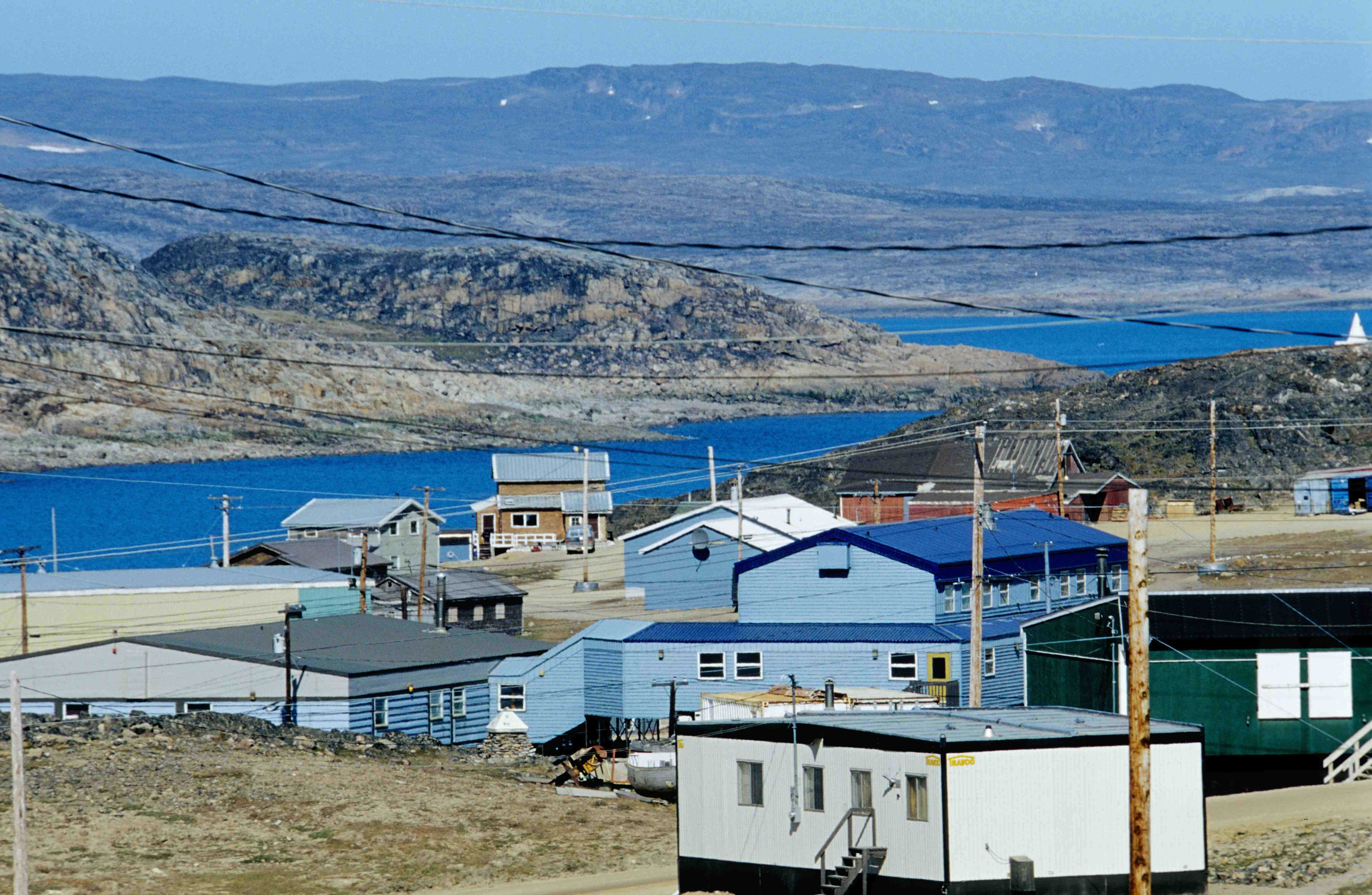
Mallik Island is in the centre, with Dorset Island's Cape Dorset in the foreground and Baffin Island's Foxe Peninsula in the background.

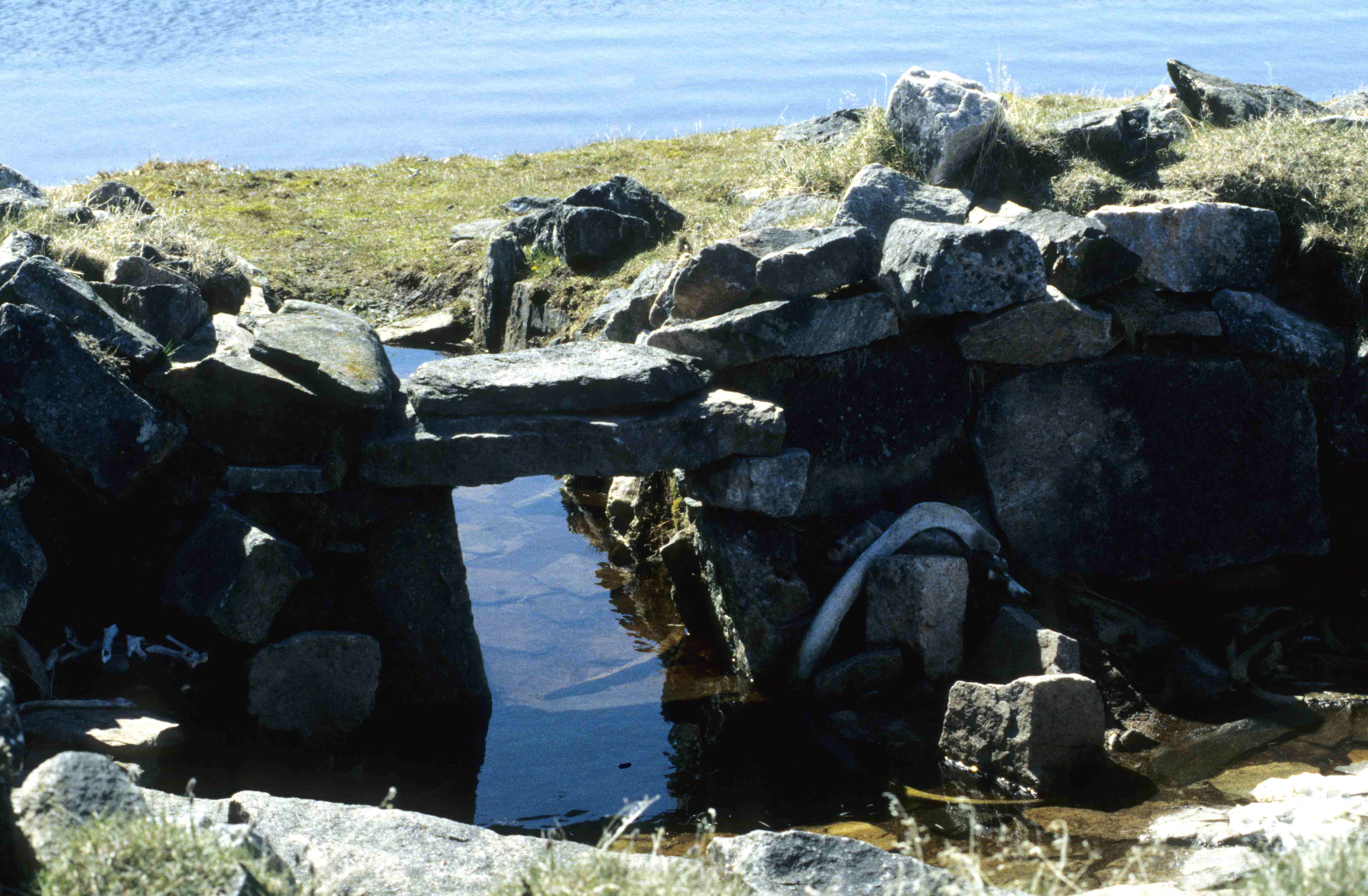
Mallikjuaq Thule site.

Mallik Island (variant: Mallikjuaq Island, meaning "big wave") is one of the uninhabited Canadian arctic islands of Qikiqtaaluk Region, Nunavut, Canada. It is located in Hudson Strait between Baffin Island's Foxe Peninsula and Dorset Island. Mallik Island and Dorset Island are joined by sand and boulders. Cape Dorset, an Inuit hamlet, is approximately 4.5 km (2.8 mi) away.

== Geography ==
Mallik Island has varied elevations; the western portion being the highest at 274 m (899 ft) above sea level. In addition to low mountains, there are waterfalls and crystalline lakes.

== Fauna and flora ==
Beluga whales, caribou, peregrine falcons, polar bears, seals, and snowy owls frequent this area.

Its habitat is characterized by rounded hills and low tundra valleys, and includes tundra wildflowers.

== Territorial park ==
Mallikjuaq Territorial Park spans both Mallik Island and Dorset Island. It is notable for its Thule culture, Dorset culture, and Inuit archaeological sites dating back as far as 3,000 years. From Cape Dorset, at low tide, the hike to Mallikjuaq Park takes approximately 45 minutes. It is also reachable by boat.
