= Françoise Oklaga =

Inuk artist (1924–1991)

- Born: 1924; Southampton Island, Canada
- Died: 1991 (aged 66–67)

Françoise Oklaga (1924 – 1991) was a visual artist from Qamani’tuaq, Nunavut, Canada. She was born on Southampton Island and moved to Qamani’tuaq with her husband in 1975. Oklaga's work ranged from illustrations to textile, carvings, and printmaking. Oklaga was a member of the indigenous Inuit community, and is the sister of Cape Dorset artists Pudlo Pudlat and Ooshutsiak Pudlat.

Oklaga's work used bright colors and fluid shapes, and often referenced important aspects of Inuit culture, including shamanism and unity between humans, animals, and the earth.
