= Saqajaa =

Island in Nunavut, Canada

- Location within Nunavut Location within Canada

Geography
- Location: Hudson Strait
- Coordinates: 64°09′N 76°33′W
- Archipelago: Arctic Archipelago

Administration
- Canada
- Territory: Nunavut
- Region: Qikiqtaaluk

Demographics
- Population: Uninhabited

Saqajaa {Inuktitut syllabics: ᓴᖃᔮ) formerly Sakkiak Island is one of the uninhabited Canadian arctic islands located in Hudson Strait, Nunavut, Canada. It is a Baffin Island offshore island in the Qikiqtaaluk Region, separated by deep water from Cape Dorset 64°10′40″N 76°29′00″W, 1.5 mi (2.4 km) to the south-southwest. The island is approximately 6 km^{2} (2.3 sq mi) in size, 2.25 mi (3.62 km) long, and 1 mi (1.6 km) wide. The elevation is approximately 65 m (213 ft) above sea level.

Kinngait, an Inuit hamlet on Dorset Island, is approximately 9.7 km (6.0 mi) away.
