= Ukaliqtuuq =

Island in the Qikiqtaaluk Region, Nunavut, Canada

- Location within Nunavut Location within Canada

Geography
- Location: Hudson Strait
- Coordinates: 64°10′N 76°37′W
- Archipelago: Arctic Archipelago

Administration
- Canada
- Nunavut: Nunavut
- Region: Qikiqtaaluk

Demographics
- Population: Uninhabited
- Source: Okolli Island at Atlas of Canada

Ukaliqtuuq (Inuktitut: ᐅᑲᓕᖅᑑᖅ) formerly Okolli Island is one of the Canadian arctic islands located in Hudson Strait, Nunavut, Canada. It is a Baffin Island offshore island in Qikiqtaaluk Region. The island is 7.2 km (4.5 mi) long and 2.4 km (1.5 mi) wide. The elevation is 107 m (351 ft) above sea level.

Kinngait, an Inuit hamlet on Dorset Island, is about 8.6 km (5.3 mi) away.
