= Anirnik Oshuitoq =

Canadian Inuk artist (1902–1983)

Anirnik Oshuitoq ᐊᓂᓂ ᐊᓯᑕ
- Born: 1902 aboard the ship Arctic
- Died: 1983 (aged 80–81); Cape Dorset, Canada
- Known for: Printmaking, drawing
- Notable work: The Oracle, 1966

Anirnik Oshuitoq (Inuktitut: ᐊᓂᓂ ᐊᓯᑕ, 1902-1983) was an Inuk graphic artist who participated in the Cape Dorset Annual Print Collections from 1961-1974.

== Life and work ==
Oshuitoq spent her early years following a traditional, nomadic way of life before marrying her first husband, Adla, in an arranged marriage. She gave birth to their daughter, the artist Ningeeuga Oshuitoq, at the age of 16. Oshuitoq settled in Cape Dorset in the early 1960s with her family, and developed her visual art practice in drawing and printmaking. Her work is characterized by its unusual blend of subject matter, which includes both Inuit spirituality and images from settler culture.

== Major exhibitions ==
Oshitoq was a regular participant in the Cape Dorset Graphics exhibitions in the 1960s and early 1970s. Her work was featured in the major survey exhibitions Grasp Tight the Old Ways: Selections from the Klamer Family Collection of Inuit Art (Art Gallery of Ontario, 1983-1985) and Inuit Modern (Art Gallery of Ontario, 2011).

== Collections ==
Anirnik Oshuitoq's prints are in several major public collections, including the Art Institute of Chicago, the Art Gallery of Ontario, the Royal Ontario Museum, the Canadian Museum of History, the Montreal Museum of Fine Arts, and the National Gallery of Canada.
