= Alashua Aningmiuq =

20th-century Canadian printmaker

- Born: 1914; Northwest Territories, Canada
- Died: 1972 (aged 57–58)

Alashua Aningmiuq (1914–1972) was an Inuk graphic artist and a carver in Nunavut, Canada working in the 1950s and 1960s.

== Biography ==
Aningmiuq was born in 1914 in the Northwest Territories (now Nunavut). Up until 1962, when the family moved to Cape Dorset, Aningmiuq, her husband Peter, and their sons Jolly, Salomonie, and Kavavau lived a traditional nomadic life. After settling in Cape Dorset, Alashua and Peter began working with the West Baffin Eskimo Co-operative as a graphic artist and a carver. Alashua's three sons are also carvers.

== Media Used ==
Aningmiuq works in both stone carved sculptures and stonecut prints. Stonecut is style of printmaking and a process mastered in Cape Dorset. To create a stonecut print a drawing is traced onto a smooth, prepared stone and then the negative spaces are cut away, leaving the outline of the drawing. Then the raised area is inked with rollers and a fine sheet of paper is pressed into the stonecut copying the carved drawing onto the paper. Both her carvings and her prints often depict animals such as polar bears, Arctic birds, and seals.

== Exhibitions ==
Aningmiuq has had exhibitions of her prints and carvings in Canada and the United States and has several of her works in the permanent collections of several museums, including the Canadian Museum of History and the McMichael Canadian Art Collection.

- Canadian Eskimo Arts Festival, Alaska Methodist University Galleries
- Inuit Graphics Through The Year: Rare Prints from the Arctic, Arctic Artistry
- Inuit Graphics from the Past, Arctic Artistry
- Inuit Traditions in Graphics: 1961-1987, Arctic Artistry
- Cape Dorset Drawings, Goddard Editions
- Cape Dorset Graphics *68, (annual collection)
- Cape Dorset Graphics *69, (annual collection)
- Inuit Graphics and Drawings from 1959-1990, Arctic Artistry
