= Peter Pitseolak =

Inuk photographer, sculptor, artist and historian (1902-1973)

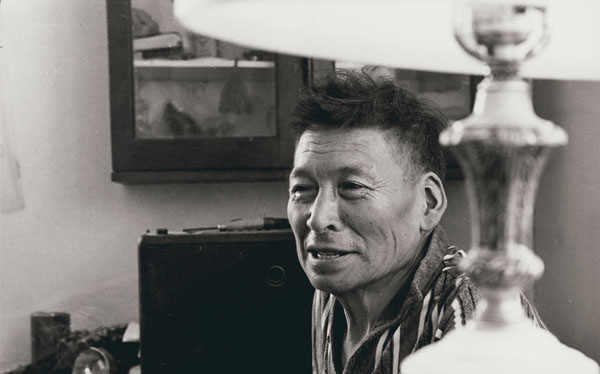
- Peter Pitseolak in 1968
- Born: September 2, 1902; Nottingham Island, Northwest Territories
- Died: September 30, 1973 (aged 71); Cape Dorset, Northwest Territories
- Spouses: Annie (m. 1923; died 1939): Aggeok

Peter Pitseolak (1902–1973) was an Inuk photographer, sculptor, artist and historian. Pitseolak was Baffin Island's first indigenous photographer.

== Life ==
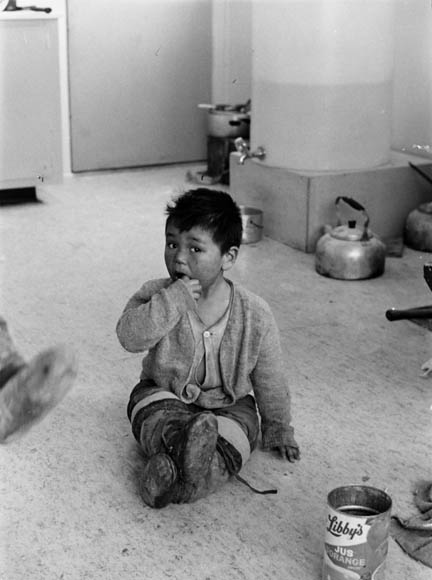
"In Peter Pitseolak's Home"

Pitseolak was born September 2, 1902, on Nottingham Island, Northwest Territories. He lived most of his life in traditional Inuit camps near Cape Dorset, on the southwest coast of Baffin Island, now in the Canadian territory of Nunavut. In the face of rapid technological change in the Inuit community, Pitseolak dedicated himself to preserving knowledge of the traditional ways of living, by writing, sketching, and especially photography. He documented customs, hunting techniques, stories and myths. His brother was Pootoogoo, a chief.

In 1912 Pitseolak met photographer Robert J. Flaherty. Flaherty, best known today for his documentary movie Nanook of the North (1922), inspired Pitseolak's interest in photography. It was not until the 1930s, however, that Pitseolak took his first recorded photograph. This was for a white visitor who was afraid to approach a polar bear for a shot. Pitseolak took the photo for him, using the visitor's camera.

In 1923 Pitseolak was married to Annie from Lake Harbour, now Kimmirut. Seven children resulted from their marriage; only Udluriak and Kooyoo, two daughters, survived. Annie was stricken with tuberculosis in 1939 and died.

Pitseolak at first began learning photography using borrowed cameras. In the 1940s Pitseolak was living in Cape Dorset working for fur-traders when he acquired his first camera, from a Catholic missionary. With the help of his second wife Aggeok (1906-1977), he developed his first photographs in a hunting igloo. Many difficulties had to be overcome, including extreme climate changes, high light levels from the reflective snowscape, and the difficulty of obtaining film and developer. Peter and Aggeok experimented. They used a battery-powered flashlight covered with red cloth as a safelight, and a lens filter made from old sunglasses.

He was also a painter, executing a series of watercolors in 1939 for John Buchan, later 2nd Baron Tweedsmuir, son of Governor General John Buchan, 1st Baron Tweedsmuir.

Pitseolak wrote various diaries, notes and manuscripts, all in Inuktitut syllabics. Along with Dorothy Harley Eber, he published People From Our Side (1975), the story of his early life, and Peter Pitseolak's Escape From Death (1977), an account of a near disaster among the ice floes.

He photographed himself, his family, and community members in candid shots. He also posed them with traditional clothing and implements. After contracting tuberculosis in 1945, Pitseolak shifted his work more towards intimate indoor photos of family and friends. Pitseolak also often used his photos as the basis of his work as a painter, carver, and printmaker. Over twenty years, Pitseolak made more than 2,000 photographs of the disappearing traditional way of life. In 1961, at the age of 59, he left his camp at Keatuk and returned to settlement life at Cape Dorset. After his death in 1973, more than 1,500 negatives and photographs were purchased from his widow for the National museums of Canada (now part of Canadian Museum of History).

The famed sculptor Okpik Pitseolak married Peter's son Mark Pitseolak. According to Terry Ryan, former manager of the West Baffin Eskimo Co-operative, Peter Pitseolak's nephew, Kananginak Pootoogook, greatly admired and was influenced by his uncle and also became an artist.

He died September 30, 1973, in Cape Dorset, Northwest Territories.

== Gallery ==
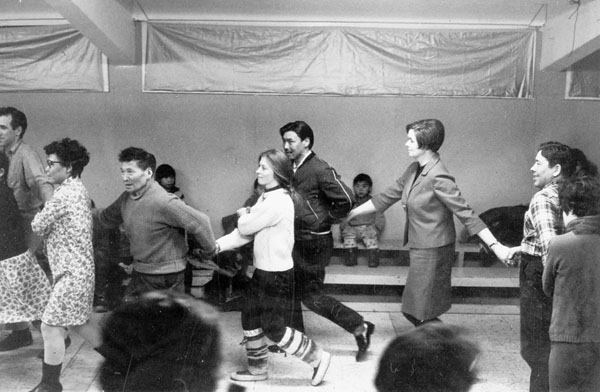
"Terry, Peter Pitseolak, Pat, Kananginak, Elli and Tommy at the Friday night dance", Apr. 1968, Cape Dorset

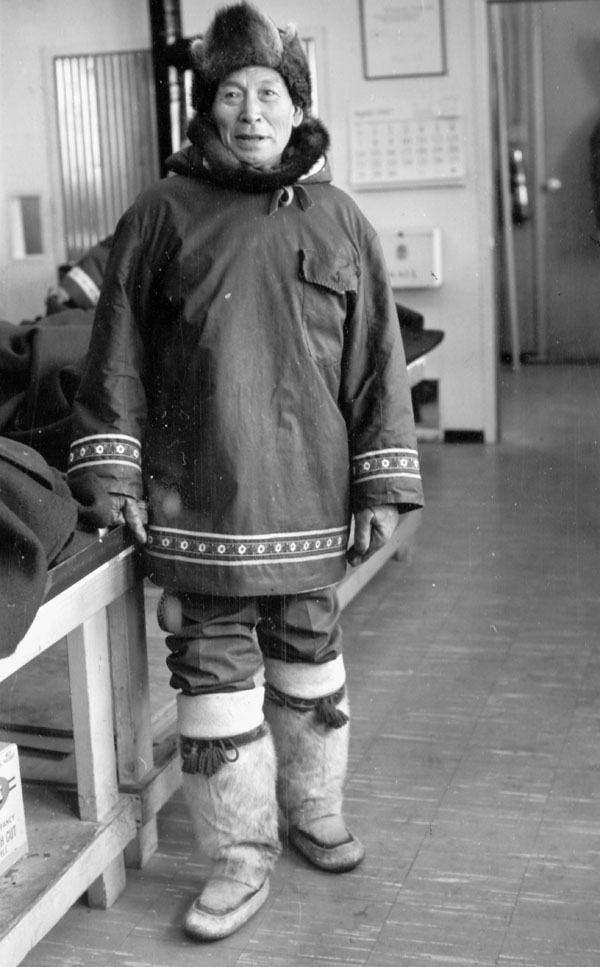
Peter Pitseolak in April 1968, Cape Dorset

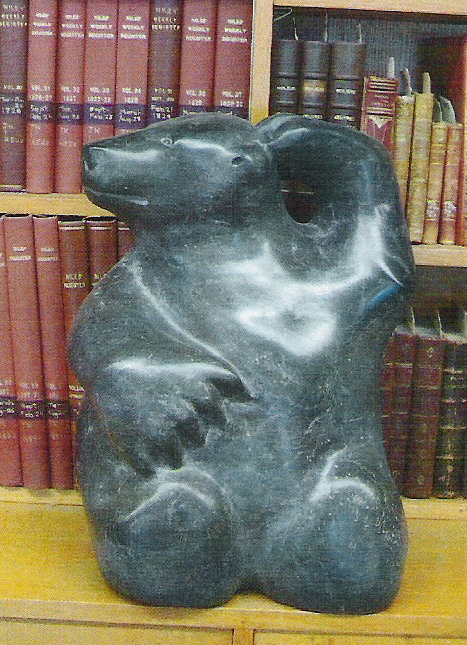
Carved soapstone bear by Peter Pitseolak; donated to Royal Military College of Canada on Oct 3 1970 by the class of 1920-4

== See also ==
- Notable Aboriginal people of Canada
