= Ookpik Pitsiulak =

Canadian Inuk carver and sculptor (1946-2019)

- ᐅᐱ ᐱᓯᐃᓚ
- Born: September 25, 1946; Lake Harbour, Northwest Territories (now Kimmirut, Nunavut)
- Died: 2019 (aged 72–73)
- Other names: Okpik Pitseolak; Pitsiulak Pitsiulak; Manning Pitsiulak; Tukpungai Pitsiulak; Pitseolak Pitsiulak; Tukpunga Pitsiulak
- Relatives: Peter Pitseolak (father-in-law)

Ookpik Pitsuilak was an Inuk carver and sculptor who worked in the Cape Dorset community of Inuit artists in Canada.

== Early life ==
Pitsiulak was born in Lake Harbour, Northwest Territories (now Kimmirut, Nunavut) in 1946. She was raised in Lake Harbour and Cape Dorset (now Kinngait, NU), where some of her relatives worked for the Hudson's Bay Company trading posts in the area.

== Artwork ==
Pitsiulak began carving in the late 1960's. She worked in soapstone, often using female figures as subjects and motherhood as a major theme. Many of her works are self-portraits. She also worked in beadwork and incorporated beading into her sculptures. Her works are part of collections in the Canadian Museum of History, the Montreal Museum of Fine Arts, and the Winnipeg Art Gallery. In 1999, she completed a tuberculosis memorial in Kinngait with Pootoogook Qiatsuk.

Pitsiulak also engaged in jewelry making and beadwork, which she learned from her paternal grandmother. She took courses in jewelry making at Nunavut Arctic College.

== Advocacy ==
Pitsiulak was a long-time member of Board of Directors of the Inuit Art Foundation and advocated for the interests of Inuit artists.
