= Dorset Council =

Dorset Council may refer to:

- Dorset Council (Australia), local government area in Tasmania, Australia
- Dorset Council (UK), a unitary authority council in England, formed in 2019
- Dorset County Council, the former county council for the county of Dorset in England, abolished in 2019

== See also ==
- Dorset (disambiguation)
