= Ulayu Pingwartok =

Inuk artist (1904–1978)

- Woman Tending Fire, 1964, silk screen
- Born: April 7, 1904; Kimmirut, Nunavut
- Died: 1978 (aged 73–74)
- Known for: drawing, printmaking

Ulayu Pingwartok (1904 – 1978) was a Canadian Inuk artist known for drawings of domestic scenes and nature.

== Biography ==
Pingwartok was born on April 7, 1904, in Lake Harbour (Kimmirut) on southwestern Baffin Island in the Northwest Territories, now Nunavut. She moved into the settlement of Cape Dorset in 1959 where she started to draw and was encouraged to create drawings for the annual print collections.

== Artwork ==
“Pingwartok produced over seven hundred drawings in her life, and thirty of them were translated into prints for ten annual Cape Dorset collections between 1965 and 1979.” Her early prints were portraits of birds, focusing on precise depiction of feather. She later concentrated in women's activities on a traditional camp life and shelter such as tents and igloos.

== Art career ==
Along with being exhibited in Cape Dorset Graphics, Pingwartok was a part of many group exhibitions in Canada and the United States, including “The Inuit Print.” She had a solo show, “Ulayu,” that toured from 1982 to 1984. Her work is collected by the National Gallery of Canada, Royal Ontario Museum, the Canadian Museum of Civilization, Winnipeg Art Gallery, and the McMichael Canadian Art Collection.

Her disc number was E7-1038.

== Exhibitions ==
Cape Dorset Graphics (annual collection and illustrated catalogue) 1965, 1966, 1967, 1969, 1974, 1975, 1976, 1977, 1978, 1979

- January - February 1967 Cape Dorset - A Decade of Eskimo, Prints & Recent Sculpture, National Gallery of Canada in cooperation with the Canadian Eskimo Art Committee, Ottawa, Ontario
- June - July 1967 4th National Burnaby Print Show, Burnaby Art Society, Burnaby, British Columbia
- 1970 Graphic Art by Eskimos of Canada: Second Collection, Cultural Affairs Division, Department of External Affairs, Ottawa, Ontario
- September - Oct 1970 Canadian Eskimo Arts Festival, Alaska Methodist University Galleries, Anchorage, Alaska, U.S.A.
- January - February 1971 The Art of the Eskimo, Simon Fraser Gallery, Simon Fraser University, Burnaby, British Columbia
- 1976 Cape Dorset Prints, London Art Gallery, Organized for the Central Huron Library, Clinton, Ontario
- Jan 1977 - June 1982 The Inuit Print/L'estampe inuit, Department of Indian Affairs and Northern Development and the National Museum of Man, Ottawa, Ontario
- July 1979 - Oct 1981 Images of the Inuit: from the Simon Fraser Collection, Simon Fraser Gallery, Simon Fraser University, Burnaby, British Columbia
- August - October 1980 The Inuit Amautik: I Like My Hood To Be Full, Winnipeg Art Gallery, Winnipeg, Manitoba
- September 1983 The Way We Were - Traditional Eskimo Life, Snow Goose Associates, Seattle, Washington, USA
- October - Nov 1983 The Cape Dorset Print, Presented at Rideau Hall by Indian and Northern Affairs Canada, Ottawa, Ontario
- September - Oct 1984 On the Land, The Arctic Circle, Los Angeles, California, U.S.A.
- May - June 1987 Inuit Graphics from the Past, Arctic Artistry, Scarsdale, New York, U.S.A.
- Dec 1987 - March 1989 Contemporary Inuit Drawings, Macdonald Stewart Art Centre, Guelph, Ontario
- March - April 1988 Works on Paper from the Permanent Collection of Inuit Art, Canadian Guild of Crafts Quebec, Montréal, Quebec
- September 1988 Canadian Prints from the McMaster Art Gallery Collection, McMaster Art Gallery, Hamilton, Ontario
- August - October 1989 Inuit Graphic Art from Indian & Northern Affairs Canada, Winnipeg Art Gallery, Winnipeg, Manitoba
- June - September 1990 Inuit Graphics and Drawings from 1959 to 1990, Arctic Artistry, Hastings-on-Hudson, New York, U.S.A.
- February - March 1991 Cape Dorset Sculpture, McMaster Art Gallery, Hamilton, Ontario

=== Solo exhibitions ===
- March 1982 - April 1984 Ulayu, Department of Indian Affairs and Northern Development, Ottawa, Ontario

== Collections ==
- Agnes Etherington Art Centre, Queen's University, Kingston, Ontario
- Amon Carter Museum of Western Art, Fort Worth, Texas, U.S.A.
- Anchorage Museum of History and Art, Anchorage, Alaska, U.S.A.
- Art Gallery of York University, Downsview, Ontario
- Art Gallery, Memorial University of Newfoundland, St. John's, Newfoundland
- Bata Shoe Museum Foundation, Don Mills, Ontario
- Canada Council Art Bank, Ottawa, Ontario
- Canadian Guild of Crafts Quebec, Montreal, Quebec
- Canadian Museum of Civilization, Hull, Quebec
- Glenbow Museum, Calgary, Alberta
- Klamer Family Collection, Art Gallery of Ontario, Toronto, Ontario
- Laurentian University Museum and Arts Centre, Sudbury, Ontario
- London Regional Art Gallery, London, Ontario
- Macdonald Stewart Art Centre, Guelph, Ontario
- McMaster University Art Gallery, Hamilton, Ontario
- McMichael Canadian Art Collection, Kleinburg, Ontario
- Mendel Art Gallery, Saskatoon, Saskatchewan
- Museum of Anthropology, University of British Columbia, Vancouver, British Columbia
- National Gallery of Canada, Ottawa, Ontario
- National Museum of the American Indian, Washington, D.C.
- Prince of Wales Northern Heritage Centre, Yellowknife, Northwest Territories
- Red Deer and District Museum and Archives, Red Deer, Alberta
- Royal Ontario Museum, Toronto, Ontario
- Simon Fraser Gallery, Simon Fraser University, Burnaby, British Columbia
- Toronto-Dominion Bank Collection, Toronto, Ontario
- University of Lethbridge Art Gallery, Lethbridge, Alberta
- University of Michigan Museum of Art, Ann Arbor, Michigan, U.S.A.
- Whyte Museum of the Canadian Rockies, Banff, Alberta
- Winnipeg Art Gallery, Winnipeg, Manitoba
- York University, Toronto, Ontario
