= Innukjuakju Pudlat =

Inuk artist (1913–1972)

- Born: March 30, 1913; Northwest Territories
- Died: March 30, 1972 (aged 59); Cape Dorset, Nunavut
- Known for: Printmaking, drawing
- Spouse: Pudlo Pudlat (m. 1950)

Innukjuakju Pudlat (1913–1972), alternatively known as Inukjurakju, Innukjuakjuk, Inujurakju, Innukjuakjuk Pudlat, Inukjurakju Pudlat, Innukyuarakjuke Pudlat, or Innukjuarakjuke Pudlat, was an Inuk artist who worked primarily in drawing and printmaking. During her artistic career she worked with the West Baffin Eskimo Cooperative in Cape Dorset, Nunavut.

== Artistic career ==
Pudlat began drawing in the late 1950s alongside her husband Pudlo Pudlat, after an arm injury made it difficult for him to practice his then-preferred artistic medium of carving. The pair were encouraged to do so by Inuit art pioneer James Archibald Houston and Terry Ryan, who later became manager of the West Baffin Eskimo Cooperative.

Pudlat's works were often made using stonecut printmaking methods, and sometimes seal skin stencil on paper. Her prints focus on playful renderings of animals living in the Cape Dorset area, such as owls, Canada geese, rabbits, and walruses. Her works also depict activities of daily life in Cape Dorset, including hunting, fishing, and singing.

== Personal life ==
Pudlat was widowed from her first marriage. In 1950, she formally married Pudlo Pudlat, a well-known and prolific Inuk graphic artist. Together, the pair had six children, of whom three daughters survived.

In 1957, Innukjuakju and Pudlo moved to Cape Dorset to access healthcare for Pudlo, who had sustained an arm injury from a hunting accident.

Pudlat's artistic career continued until she became ill in 1970. She died in Cape Dorset on March 30, 1972.

== Notable collections ==
- National Gallery of Canada
- Museum of Anthropology at UBC
- Morris and Helen Belkin Art Gallery
- Canadian Museum of History
