= Kinngait Airport =

Airport in Kinngait, Nunavut, Canada

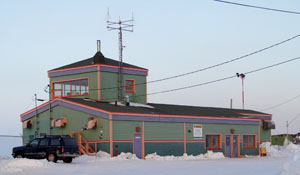
- IATA: YTE; ICAO: CYTE; WMO: 71910

Summary
- Airport type: Public
- Operator: Government of Nunavut
- Location: Kinngait, Nunavut
- Time zone: EST (UTC−05:00)
  - Summer (DST): EDT (UTC−04:00)
- Elevation AMSL: 158 ft / 48 m
- Coordinates: 64°13′49″N 076°31′30″W

Map
- Location in Nunavut CYTE (Canada)

Runways
Direction	Length		Surface
Direction	ft	m	Surface
13/31	3,988	1,216	Gravel

Statistics (2010)
- Aircraft movements: 1,016
- Sources: Canada Flight Supplement; Movements from Statistics Canada. Environment Canada

Kinngait Airport (IATA: YTE, ICAO: CYTE) (Inuktitut: ᑭᙵᐃᑦ ᒥᑦᑕᕐᕕᒃ, romanized: Kinngait Mittarvik) is located at Kinngait (formerly Cape Dorset), Nunavut, Canada, and is operated by the Government of Nunavut.

Turbo-prop aircraft are used and handled at this airport due to the runway surface and length.

== Airlines and destinations ==
Airlines	Destinations
Canadian North	Iqaluit
