= Pudlo Pudlat =

Canadian Inuk artist (1916–1992)

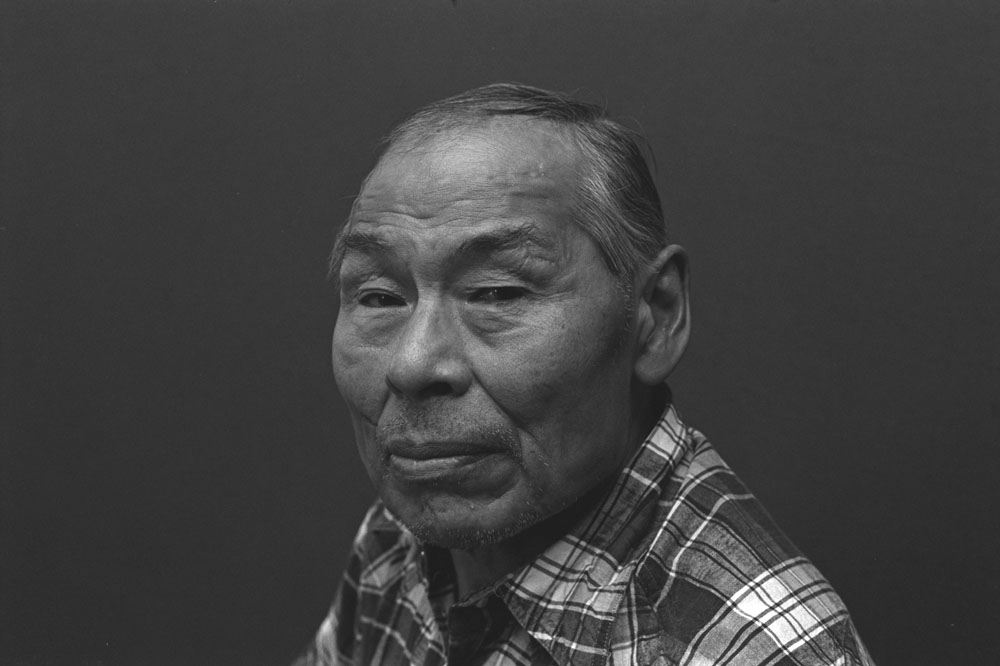
- Pudlo Pudlat in 1980
- Born: February 4, 1916; Kamadjuak Camp, Baffin Island, Canada
- Died: December 28, 1992 (aged 76); Cape Dorset
- Spouse: Innukjuakju Pudlat (m. 1950; died 1972)

Pudlo Pudlat (Inuktitut: ᐳᓗ ᐳᓚ), (February 4, 1916 - December 28, 1992) was a Canadian Inuk artist whose preferred medium was a combination of acrylic wash and coloured pencils. His works are in the collections of most Canadian museums. At his death in 1992, Pudlo left a body of work that included more than 4000 drawings and 200 prints.

== Biography ==
Born at Kamadjuak Camp, Baffin Island, Canada, Pudlat lived for much of his life in the Kimmirut region in what is now the Canadian Territory of Nunavut, hunting and fishing with his family along the southwest coast of Baffin Island. Pudlo began drawing in the early 1960s after he abandoned the semi-nomadic way of life and settled in Cape Dorset. He experienced firsthand the radical transformation of life in the Arctic that occurred in the 20th Century and reached its peak in the 1950s. In 1950, he married fellow Inuk artist Innukjuakju Pudlat, and they remained together until her death in 1972.

Until he was six, he lived around Coral Harbour; later, he moved to the region of Lake Harbour, now called Kimmirut. A younger sister is fellow artist Françoise Oklaga although she was adopted by another family at a young age. In the late 1950s, when he was already in his 40s, he moved to Kiaktuuq near Cape Dorset to recover from a bout of tuberculosis. It was there he met Inuit art pioneer James Archibald Houston and began his career as an artist.

Pudlat spent 33 years creating art. He began by carving sculpture, but he found carving difficult because of an arm injury, so he switched to drawing around 1959 or 1960. Initially encouraged by James Houston and then by Terry Ryan of the West Baffin Eskimo Co-operative, he embraced drawing and later printmaking and painting as these media were introduced in the north. Pudlo occasionally traveled south and to other parts of the Arctic for medical treatment. The objects which he encountered throughout his travels, particularly airplanes, are prominent in his subject matter.

In 1972 one of Pudlat's prints was selected for reproduction on a UNICEF greeting card. Pudlo travelled to Ottawa to attend the opening of an exhibition of the works. He remembered it as the first work for which he was invited south and accorded public recognition.

Pudlat died in 1992, at Cape Dorset. His last prints appear in the annual Cape Dorset Print collection and catalogue of 1993.

=== Chronology of Pudlo's artistic career ===
Umiakjuak by Pudlo Pudlat. Collections of National Gallery of Canada.

- 1990 - Opening of "Pudlo: Thirty Years of Drawing", the first solo show for an Inuk artist at the National Gallery of Canada.
- 1989 - Travelled to Mannheim, Germany, to attend the opening of his solo exhibition at the Inuit Galerie.
- 1980 - A single lithograph commission "In Celebration" was undertaken by Pudlo, to commemorate the anniversary of the Canadian Guild of Crafts in Montreal, Quebec. This work is also included in the annual Cape Dorset print catalogue in 1980.
- 1979 - Commissioned by the Canadian Guild of Crafts Quebec, Montreal, to create a lithograph to commemorate the first exhibition of contemporary Inuit art held at the Guild in Montreal.
- 1979 - Queen Elizabeth Hotel Commission. Honouring 29 "Great Montrealers" Pudlo produced a lithograph entitled "Shores of the Settlement". The print was included in the annual Cape Dorset print collection and catalogue in 1979. The artist travelled to Montreal to attend the presentation.
- 1978 - Commissioned by the Department of Indian Affairs and Northern Development to create two designs to be silkscreened onto banners for the DIAND headquarters lobby in Ottawa; Pudlo travelled to Oakville, Ontario, to work on the designs at Sheridan College.
- 1978 - Pudlo's 1976 print "Aeroplane" was reproduced on a Canadian postage stamp.
- 1976 - Pudlo was one of four Kinngait (Cape Dorset) artists commissioned to produce a collection of prints for the first UN Habitat Conference which was held in Vancouver, British Columbia, Canada. The prints appeared in the annual Cape Dorset print collection and catalogue in 1981.
- 1976 - Attended the Toronto opening of the annual Kinngait (Cape Dorset) print collection at the Innuit Gallery of Eskimo Art.
- 1972 - Pudlo Pudlat’s design, along with designs by four other Canadian Inuit artists, was chosen for a series of UNICEF greeting cards.

== Artistic themes ==
Pudlo's art is characterized by a playful sense of humour and a fascination with the trappings of modern life, especially airplanes. His early drawings are simple outlines made with lead pencil. In the mid-1960s, Pudlo began to work with coloured pencils and felt-tipped pens, and his art became more elaborate. In many ways Pudlo's work symbolizes the paradoxes of the encounter between traditional Inuit culture and modern life.

"Pudlo's works over the years demonstrate his keen visual sense, his versatility and innovativeness in subject matter and technique — tempered by his sense of humour — his knowledge of traditional life on the land, and his acknowledgement of the changing times.... Pudlo's thinking/drawing process is a truly creative approach, done both consciously and unconsciously. In the 1978 Cape Dorset print catalogue (page 67) Pudlo talks about his drawing: At times when I draw, I am happy, but sometimes it is very hard. I have been drawing a long time now. I only draw what I think, but sometimes I think the pencil has a brain too." Jean Blodgett, "Grasp Tight the Old Ways", 1983

== Solo exhibitions ==
- 2000 Pudlo Pudlat: Print Retrospective, The Isaacs/Inuit Gallery, Toronto, Ontario
- 1996 Southern Exposure: Original Drawings by Pudlo Pudlat, Feheley Fine Arts, Toronto, Ontario
- 1995 Pudlo: Original Drawings, Albers Gallery, San Francisco, California
- 1994 Pudlo Pudlat aus Cape Dorset, Inuit Galerie, Mannheim, Germany
- 1993 Print Exhibition, Pitaloosie Saila, Pitseolak Ashoona, Pudlo Pudlat, Gallery Indigena, Waterloo, Ontario
- 1993 A Retrospective of Pudlo Pudlat Prints, The Canadian Guild of Arts Quebec, Montreal, Quebec
- 1993 Pudlo: A Celebration, National Gallery of Canada, Ottawa, Ontario
- 1993 Pudlo: Original Drawings, Albers Gallery, San Francisco, California
- 1993 Pudlo Pudlat: A Meeting of Cultures, McMichael Canadian Art Collection, Kleinburg, Ontario
- 1992 - 93 Oonark, Pudlo, Kananginak, Winnipeg Art Gallery, Winnipeg, Manitoba
- 1991 The Path of Pudlo, Arctic Artistry, Hastings-On-Hudson, New York
- 1990 - 91 Pudlo: Thirty Years of Drawing, National Gallery of Canada, Ottawa, Ontario
- 1990 Pudlo Pudlat Retrospective, Canadian Guild of Crafts Quebec, Montreal, Quebec
- 1990 Pudlo Pudlat: New Drawings, The Innuit Gallery of Eskimo Art, Toronto, Ontario
- 1990 Pudlo Pudlat Drawings, Ufundi Gallery, Ottawa, Ontario
- 1989 Pudlo Pudlat, Inuit Galerie, Mannheim, Germany
- 1989 Prints by Pudlo Pudlat of Cape Dorset, Gallery Indigena, Stratford, Ontario
- 1989 Pudlo Pudlat, Gallery Indigena, Waterloo, Ontario
- 1987 Drawings by Pudlo of Cape Dorset, The Innuit Gallery of Eskimo Art, Toronto, Ontario
- 1983 - 84 Pudlo Pudlat, Confederation Centre Art Gallery and Museum, Charlottetown, Prince Edward Island
- 1982 - 84 Pudlo, Department of Indian Affairs and Northern Development, Ottawa, Ontario
- 1981 Pudlo Pudlat - Arctic Landscapes, Theo Waddington, New York, New York
- 1980 Pudlo Pudlat - Ten Oversize Works on Paper, Theo Waddington, New York, New York
- 1979 Pudlo Acrylics, Fleet Gallery, Winnipeg, Manitoba
- 1978 Pudlo: Acrylic Paintings, The Innuit Gallery of Eskimo Art, Toronto, Ontario
- 1978 Pudlo Pudlat - Acrylic Paintings, Canadian Guild of Crafts Quebec, Montreal, Quebec
- 1976 Pudlo Prints, Habitat: UN Conference of Human Settlements, Department of Indian Affairs and Northern Development, Ottawa, Ontario

== Publications ==
- 1993 Ryan, Terrence PUDLO PUDLAT'S FORCEFUL LEGACY: Who will follow the Master?. Arctic Circle
- 1990 Routledge, Marie PUDLO: THIRTY YEARS OF DRAWING. Ottawa: National Gallery of Canada
