= Dorset Island =

Island in the Arctic Archipelago

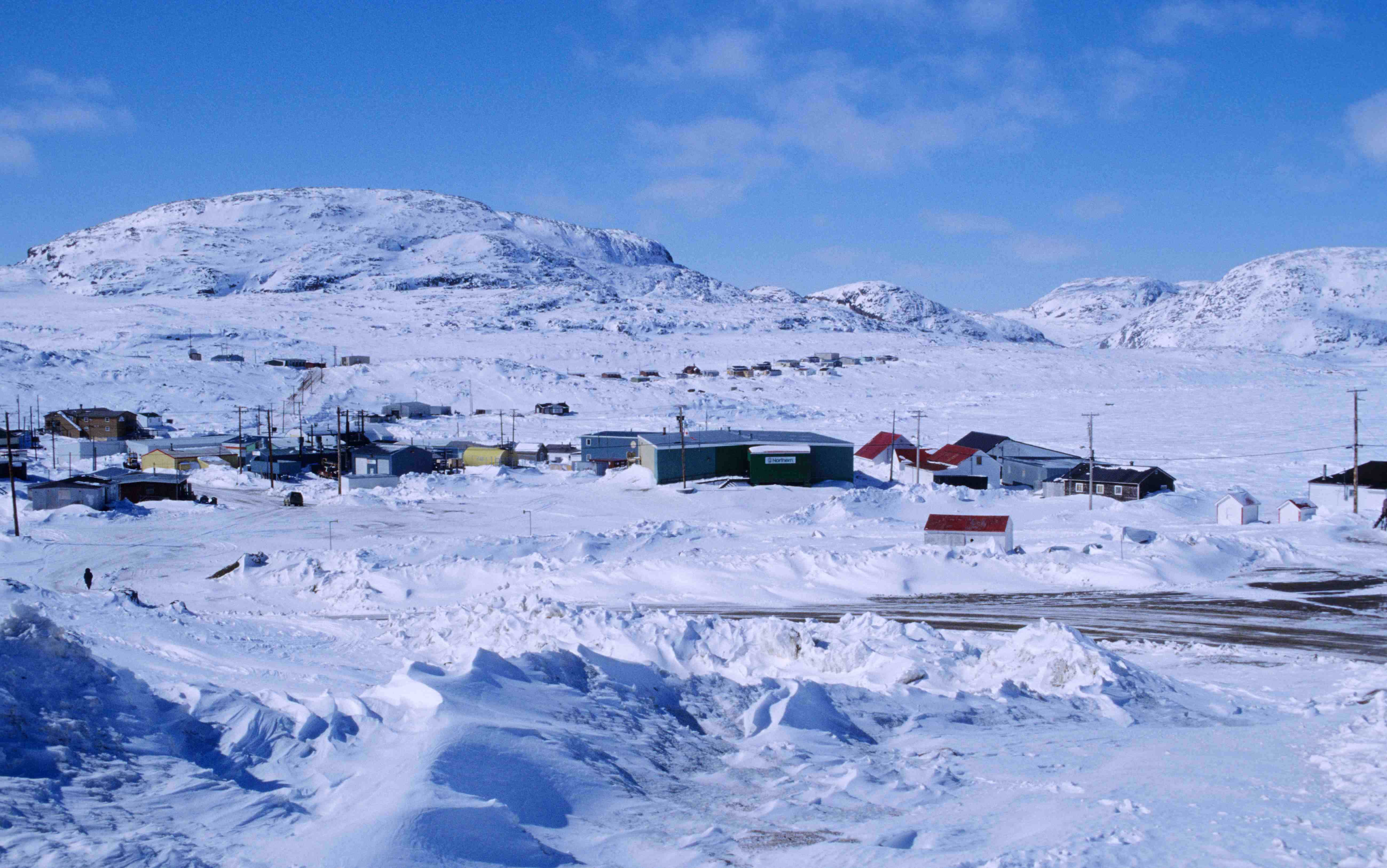
- Dorset Island's Kinngait Hill and the hamlet of Cape Dorset, 1997

- Location within Nunavut Location within Canada

Geography
- Location: Hudson Strait
- Coordinates: 64°12′N 76°32′W
- Archipelago: Arctic Archipelago
- Area: 143.48 km^{2} (55.40 sq mi)
- Highest elevation: 208 m (682 ft)
- Highest point: Kingnait Hill

Administration
- Canada
- Territory: Nunavut
- Region: Qikiqtaaluk
- Largest settlement: Kinngait (pop. 1,396)

Demographics
- Population: 1,396 (2021)
- Ethnic groups: Inuit

Dorset Island, or Cape Dorset Island, is one of the Canadian Arctic islands located in Hudson Strait, Nunavut, Canada. It lies off the Foxe Peninsula area of southwestern Baffin Island in the Qikiqtaaluk Region. It is serviced by an airport and a harbour.

The island was named after the statesman Edward Sackville, 4th Earl of Dorset.

== Geography ==
The island is 6.4 km (4 mi) long and 3.2 km (2 mi) wide, with its highest elevation 220 m (720 ft) above sea level.

On the southern end of Dorset Island, at an elevation of 243 m (797 ft) above sea level, is Cape Dorset (64°10′40″N 76°29′00″W), which projects into the Hudson Strait. It is part of the Kingnait Range (Kingnait, in Inuktitut, means "high mountains"). The cape represents the southern tip of the Foxe Peninsula. On September 24, 1631, Captain Luke Foxe named the landform "Cape Dorset" to honour his benefactor, Edward Sackville, 4th Earl of Dorset.

Kingnait Hill, at 208 m (682 ft) high, is located on the island's north-west side. The shorter Eegatuak Hill is located 1.1 km (0.7 mi) north of the cape, on its eastern side, rising 99 m (325 ft) above sea level, and exhibiting a distinctive bowl-shape surmounted by a cairn.

Mallik Island (Mallikjuaq Island), directly to the north, is joined to Dorset Island by sand and boulders. A natural harbour exists in the peninsula formed by the southeast side of Mallik Island and the northwest side of Dorset Island with prevailing northwesterly winds at 10 to 15 kn (19 to 28 km/h; 12 to 17 mph) knots, stronger in September and October. The anchorage may have heavy swell conditions and there is frequent fog during the navigation season of early August through mid-October. Ice break-up is around mid-July, and freeze-up occurs in early November. Winter ice thickness can be up to 1.2 m (3 ft 11 in).

There are several other islands within 10 km (6.2 mi), including Ukaliqtuuq and Saqajaa.

== History ==
In 1913, a trading post was established on the island by the Hudson's Bay Company. A Roman Catholic mission was located on Dorset Island during the period of 1938 to 1960.

The first discovery of the remains of Dorset culture was on Dorset Island. An ancient Paleo-Eskimo people, they flourished in this area for about 2,000 years, during the period of 1000 BC through 1100 AD. Present-day Dorset Islanders, Inuit who descend from the later Thule culture, refer to Dorset culture people as Tuniit in their legends.

In 1947, the Nascopie, a Hudson's Bay Company supply ship was wrecked on the island. Some of the ship was salvaged by Inuit for building supplies.

== Community ==
Across from Mallik Island, on the northern side of Dorset Island is the Inuit hamlet of Kinngait (formerly Cape Dorset). It is the only community on the island and is home to 1,396 people. It is approximately 11.6 km (7.2 mi) north of the mountain cape bearing the same name. Because the people of this community are known for their artisanship, including drawing, printmaking, and carving, the community of Kinngait is commonly referred to as the "Inuit art capital".

== Gallery ==
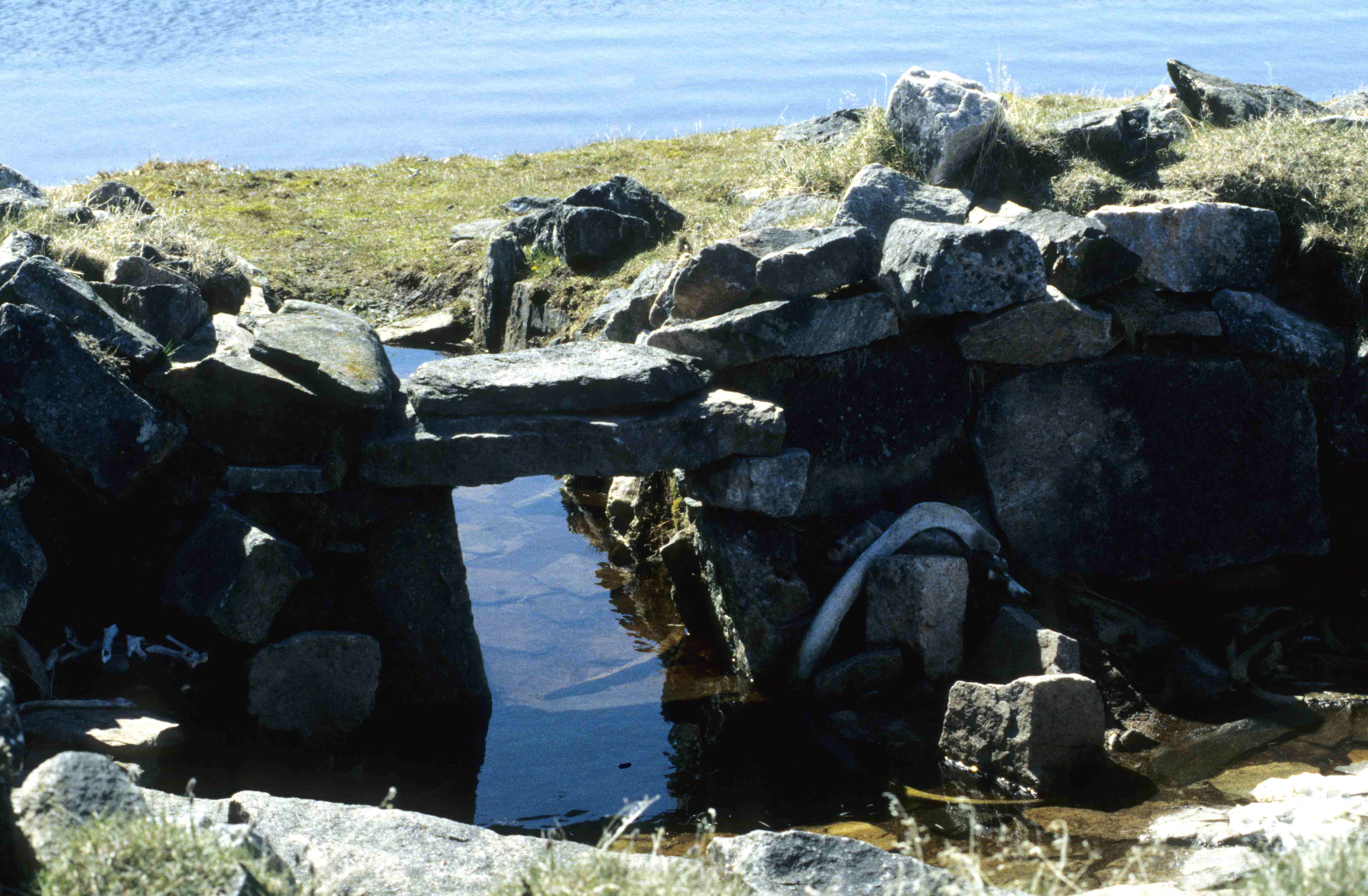
Thule site on Mallik Island (opposite Kinngait)

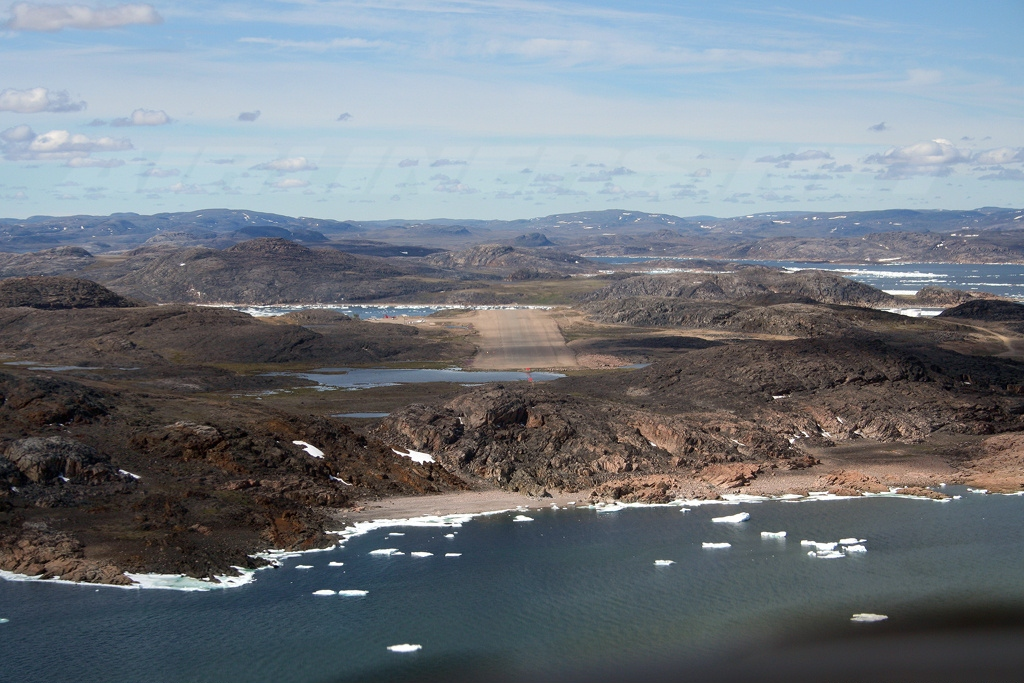
Looking towards Dorset Island and the Kinngait Airport

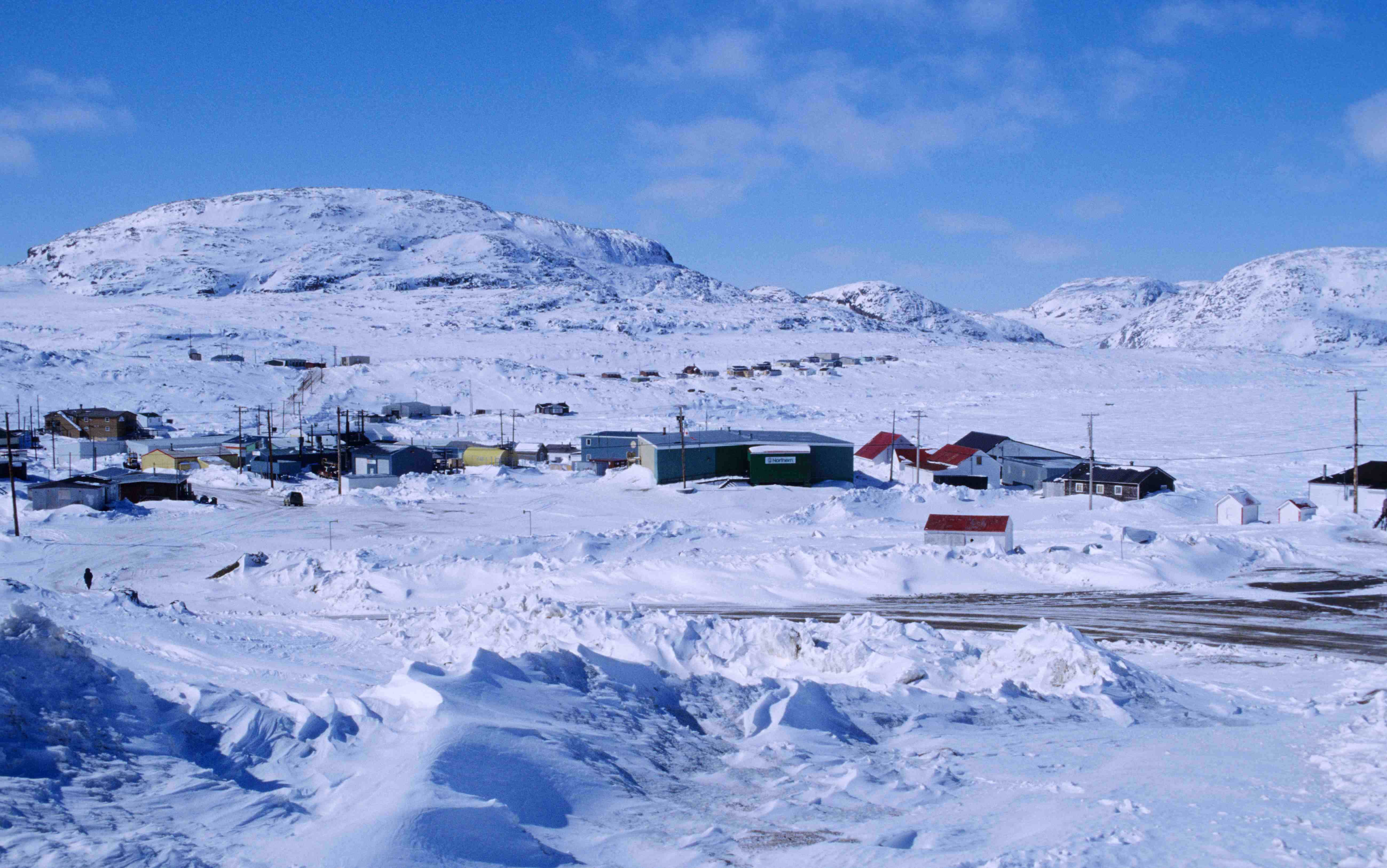
Early springtime in Kinngait

== Wildlife ==
The island and its surrounds are frequented by Baffin Island wolves, polar bears, and Arctic fox, as well as caribou and Arctic hare. Seals appear regularly, as do beluga whales during their migration through by the island in October and April.

Peregrine falcons, snowy owls, ptarmigan and ducks abound. Ornithologists consider the island's cape a major entry way to the nesting area of the blue goose. In 1929, it was the departure point for naturalist Dr. J. Dewey Soper in his quest for locate the blue goose's Foxe Basin nest area.

Mallikjuaq Territorial Park spans both Dorset Island and Mallik Island. Notable for its Thule culture, Dorset culture, and Inuit archaeological sites that date back as far as 3,000 years ago, it is reachable by foot from Kinngait at low tide, or by boat.

== Climate ==
The area has a tundra climate (ET) with short but cool summers and long cold winters.

Climate data for Kinngait (Kinngait Airport) WMO ID: 71910; coordinates 64°13′09″N 76°31′30″W; elevation: 48.2 m (158 ft); 1991–2020 normals, extremes 1963–present
Month	Jan	Feb	Mar	Apr	May	Jun	Jul	Aug	Sep	Oct	Nov	Dec	Year
Record high humidex	0.2	0.7	0.7	4.4	10.4	18.8	25.0	21.6	12.7	6.5	3.4	1.7	25.0
Record high °C (°F)	0.9 (33.6)	1.9 (35.4)	0.8 (33.4)	5.6 (42.1)	10.9 (51.6)	19.7 (67.5)	25.0 (77.0)	21.9 (71.4)	18.1 (64.6)	7.1 (44.8)	3.4 (38.1)	2.2 (36.0)	25.0 (77.0)
Mean daily maximum °C (°F)	−20.7 (−5.3)	−21.6 (−6.9)	−17.4 (0.7)	−9.2 (15.4)	−1.9 (28.6)	5.7 (42.3)	12.1 (53.8)	9.9 (49.8)	4.1 (39.4)	−1.0 (30.2)	−7.2 (19.0)	−14.2 (6.4)	−5.1 (22.8)
Daily mean °C (°F)	−23.7 (−10.7)	−24.4 (−11.9)	−20.7 (−5.3)	−12.4 (9.7)	−4.2 (24.4)	2.9 (37.2)	8.3 (46.9)	6.8 (44.2)	2.2 (36.0)	−2.7 (27.1)	−9.5 (14.9)	−17.1 (1.2)	−7.9 (17.8)
Mean daily minimum °C (°F)	−26.3 (−15.3)	−27.1 (−16.8)	−23.9 (−11.0)	−15.5 (4.1)	−6.4 (20.5)	0.1 (32.2)	4.5 (40.1)	3.8 (38.8)	0.1 (32.2)	−4.4 (24.1)	−12.0 (10.4)	−19.8 (−3.6)	−10.6 (12.9)
Record low °C (°F)	−38.9 (−38.0)	−40.6 (−41.1)	−42.2 (−44.0)	−32.8 (−27.0)	−19.6 (−3.3)	−7.4 (18.7)	−3.4 (25.9)	−4.6 (23.7)	−8.3 (17.1)	−23.9 (−11.0)	−30.6 (−23.1)	−42.8 (−45.0)	−42.8 (−45.0)
Record low wind chill	−54.5	−58.1	−53.0	−44.6	−29.3	−14.6	−7.0	−8.7	−14.7	−39.7	−40.1	−51.4	−58.1
Average precipitation mm (inches)	19.4 (0.76)	17.2 (0.68)	26.1 (1.03)	25.8 (1.02)	27.8 (1.09)	33.3 (1.31)	39.0 (1.54)	57.3 (2.26)	52.9 (2.08)	48.0 (1.89)	37.0 (1.46)	29.6 (1.17)	413.2 (16.27)
Average rainfall mm (inches)	0.0 (0.0)	0.0 (0.0)	0.0 (0.0)	0.3 (0.01)	4.0 (0.16)	20.9 (0.82)	37.8 (1.49)	52.1 (2.05)	35.7 (1.41)	7.2 (0.28)	0.0 (0.0)	0.0 (0.0)	158.0 (6.22)
Average snowfall cm (inches)	24.2 (9.5)	24.2 (9.5)	28.3 (11.1)	32.8 (12.9)	29.7 (11.7)	8.5 (3.3)	0.2 (0.1)	1.2 (0.5)	13.2 (5.2)	40.1 (15.8)	50.6 (19.9)	37.6 (14.8)	290.7 (114.4)
Average precipitation days (≥ 0.2 mm)	15.2	13.0	15.7	14.0	12.7	10.1	11.1	13.0	15.7	17.5	19.0	18.2	175.1
Average rainy days (≥ 0.2 mm)	0.0	0.0	0.0	0.4	1.9	6.8	11.4	13.3	10.6	3.2	0.1	0.0	47.8
Average snowy days (≥ 0.2 cm)	16.0	14.5	15.3	14.4	14.6	4.8	0.1	0.4	6.9	17.8	19.8	19.0	143.6
Average relative humidity (%) (at 1500 LST)	72.7	71.7	72.8	78.1	83.1	77.0	69.8	75.6	81.4	84.4	83.6	79.2	77.4
Mean monthly sunshine hours	7.6	72.5	172.6	215.7	157.0	220.1	274.1	187.3	87.4	45.2	17.6	0.0	1,457.2
Percentage possible sunshine	4.5	30.3	47.5	47.8	27.5	35.1	44.9	36.8	22.2	14.9	9.0	0.0	26.7
Source: Environment and Climate Change Canada (rain/rain days, snow/snow days 1981–2010) Canadian Climate Normals 1981–2010
