= Kinngait =

Kinngait Sikusiilaq ᑭᙵᐃᑦ
- Hamlet
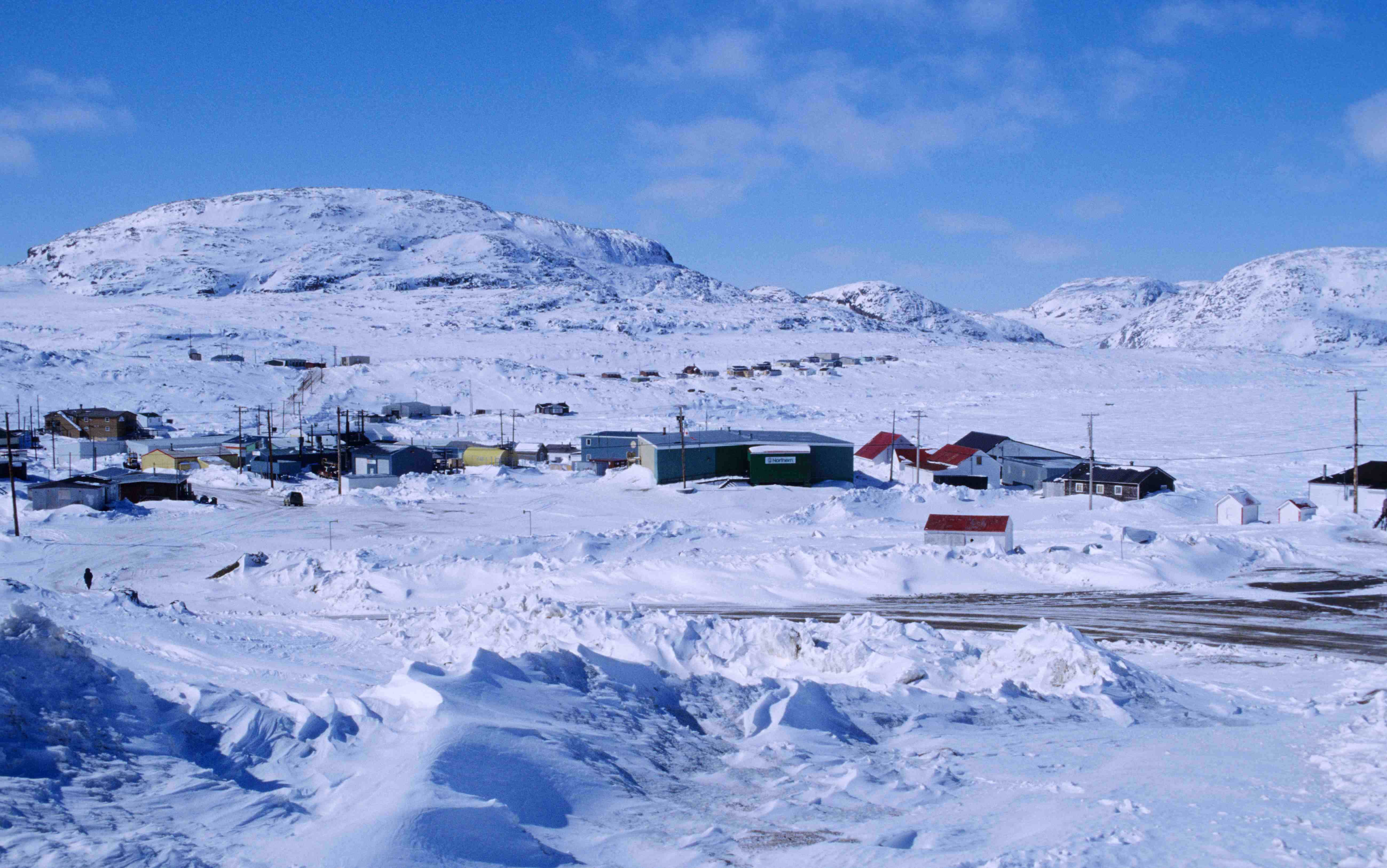
- Part of the village with characteristic Kinngait hill, May 1997
- Nickname: Capital of Inuit Art
- Location within Nunavut Location within Canada
- Coordinates: 64°14′00″N 076°32′30″W
- Country: Canada
- Territory: Nunavut
- Region: Qikiqtaaluk
- Electoral district: South Baffin
- Federal Electoral district: Nunavut
- Hudson's Bay Company post: 1913

Government
  - Type: Hamlet
  - Mayor: Jimmy Manning
  - MLA: David Joanasie
  - MP: Lori Idlout
  - Senator: Dennis Patterson

Area (2021)
  - Total: 9.89 km^{2} (3.82 sq mi)
- Elevation: 50 m (160 ft)
- Highest elevation: 243 m (797 ft)
- Lowest elevation: 0 m (0 ft)

Population (2021)
  - Total: 1,396
  - Density: 141.2/km^{2} (366/sq mi)
- Time zone: UTC−05:00 (EST)
  - Summer (DST): UTC−04:00 (EDT)
- Postal code: X0A 0C0
- Area code: 867

Kinngait (Inuktitut meaning 'high mountain' or 'where the hills are'; Inuktitut: ᑭᙵᐃᑦ or ᑭᖖᒉᑦ, romanized: Kinngait or Kinnggait), known as Cape Dorset until 27 February 2020, is an Inuit hamlet located on Dorset Island near Foxe Peninsula at the southern tip of Baffin Island in the Qikiqtaaluk Region of Nunavut, Canada.

== History ==
Kinngait, previously Cape Dorset and Sikusiilaq before that is where the remains of the Thule (Early Inuit) and pre-Inuit Dorset people (Tuniit) were discovered, who lived between 1000 BCE and 1100 CE. The European name of Cape Dorset was given by Captain Luke Foxe after Edward Sackville, 4th Earl of Dorset, on 24 September 1631. The Inuit originally called the inlet Sikusiilaq, after the area of sea ocean nearby that remains ice-free all winter. Hudson's Bay Company set up a trading post here in 1913, where they traded furs and skins for supplies such as tobacco, ammunition, flour, gas, tea and sugar.

In December 2019, the residents of Cape Dorset voted in favour of a request to officially rename the hamlet to its Inuktitut name of Kinngait. Voters chose between Kinngait, Sikusiilaq, and the English name of Cape Dorset.

== Art ==
Since the 1950s, Kinngait, which calls itself the "Capital of Inuit Art", has been a centre for drawing, printmaking, and carving. In the 21st century, printmaking and carving continue to be the community's main economic activities. Each year, Kinngait Studios issues an annual print collection. Kinngait has been hailed as the most artistic community in Canada, with some 22% of the labour force employed in the arts.

In 1957, James Archibald Houston created a graphic arts workshop in Kinngait, in a program sponsored by the Department of Northern Affairs and National Resources. It was considered a way for the community to generate income by adapting traditional art forms to contemporary techniques. Houston collected drawings from community artists and encouraged local Inuit stone carvers to apply their skills to stone-block printing, in order to create art that might be more widely sold and distributed. The print program was modelled after Japanese ukiyo-e workshops. Other cooperative print shops were established in nearby communities, but the Kinngait workshop has remained the most successful. The artists have experimented with etching, engraving, lithography, and silkscreen. Known as the West Baffin Eskimo Cooperative, or the Kinngait Co-operative, they produce annual catalogues advertising the limited edition prints.

Between the years of 1959 and 1974, Kinngait artists produced more than 48,000 prints. Well-known artists of Kinngait include Pitseolak Ashoona, Nuna Parr, Pudlo Pudlat, Angotigolu Teevee, Alashua Aningmiuq, Kiugak Ashoona, Ulayu Pingwartok, Oopik Pitsuilak, Innukjuakju Pudlat, Taqialuk Nuna Lucy Qinnuayuak, Mary Qayuaryuk, Anirnik Oshuitoq, and Kenojuak Ashevak. Parr's carvings are internationally recognised, and his work is exhibited in the National Gallery of Canada. Ashevak's drawings of owls have been chosen to appear on Canadian stamps as well as a Canadian quarter.

Inuk carver, artist, photographer and author Peter Pitseolak spent several years living in Kinngait. The local junior-senior high school was named for him.

== Demographics ==
Federal census population history of Kinngait
Year	Pop.	±%
1976	688	—
1981	784	+14.0%
1986	872	+11.2%
1991	961	+10.2%
1996	1,118	+16.3%
2001	1,148	+2.7%
2006	1,236	+7.7%
2011	1,363	+10.3%
2016	1,441	+5.7%
2021	1,396	−3.1%
Source: Statistics Canada

In the 2021 Canadian census conducted by Statistics Canada, Kinngait had a population of 1,396 living in 362 of its 416 total private dwellings, a change of −3.1% from its 2016 population of 1,441. With a land area of 9.89 km^{2} (3.82 sq mi), it had a population density of 141.2/km^{2} (365.6/sq mi) in 2021.

== Transportation ==
A handful of unnamed dirt/gravel roads (unpaved because of winter conditions) cross the village but do not connect beyond Kinngait. Cars and trucks are the main means of transportation and supplemented by snowmobiles and ATVs (all-terrain vehicles) during the winter. The people use boats and ships for seasonal travel to and from Kinngait when the Hudson Strait is ice-free.

The area is serviced by the Kinngait Airport with connections only within Nunavut. Travel outside Nunavut can be made via connections through Iqaluit Airport.

== Education ==
The only secondary school in town, Peter Pitseolak School (PPS), was destroyed by fire set by three youths in September 2015. In summer 2019, the school opened a printmaking studio workshop space for children, through the Embassy of Imagination program.

Sam Pudlat School is the community's only elementary school; it has enrollment of 227 students. Attendance is good at the elementary school but quite poor at the high school.

Post-secondary education is available in a limited number of areas in Kinngait at the Community Learning Centre. Nunavut Arctic College, based in Iqaluit, periodically offers community-based programs in Kinngait at the Community Learning Centre.

== Community services ==
The Royal Canadian Mounted Police has a detachment staffed by six officers and sometimes number as many as 10 officers with one sergeant and one corporal.

The Fire Department is staffed by 25 volunteers and a pumper at a single fire hall. There is a lack of fire hydrants in the town, so each run has to be filled up at the water station.

Medical facilities are basic at the Cape Dorset Health Centre. Advanced medical care requires an airlift to the 35-bed Qikiqtani General Hospital in Iqaluit. There is no ambulance in the town. Qualified doctors visit only occasionally. There is a taxi service but it is not consistently reliable.

== Broadband communications ==
The community has been served by the Qiniq network since 2005. The Qiniq network is designed and operated by SSi Canada. In 2017, the network was upgraded to 4G LTE technology, and 2G-GSM for mobile voice.

== Housing ==
Like the rest of Nunavut, houses are overcrowded, with a 2006 report saying that up to 12 people were living in a two-bedroom unit. Tuberculosis is active in the town. This is made more acutely dangerous as the overcrowding continues. However, the Nunavut Housing Corporation plans to build 5 new housing units in the town by late 2022 or early 2023.

== Food insecurity ==
The cost of basic food staples like milk, cheese, flour, and butter is 65-75% higher than in Ottawa or Montreal, which has led to high rates of food insecurity in Kinngait, as well as in the rest of Nunavut.

== Tourism ==
Spanning both Dorset Island and Mallik Island, Mallikjuaq Territorial Park is notable for archaeological sites revealing Thule culture, Dorset culture, and Inuit history. The park is reachable by foot from Kinngait at low tide, or by boat.

A cairn was raised in memory of the ship, RMS Nascopie, a supply ship to the Arctic, that hit a rock and sank in 1947. Although the cargo was lost, the passengers and crew were saved.

In September 2018, the Kenojuak Cultural Centre and Print Shop opened. The centre is named after local artist and Inuit art pioneer Kenojuak Ashevak who died in 2013. The centre serves a community facility, art studio and exhibition space for local artists.

There are outfitters that provide numerous dog sledding, camping, and hiking to parks tours.

== Gallery ==
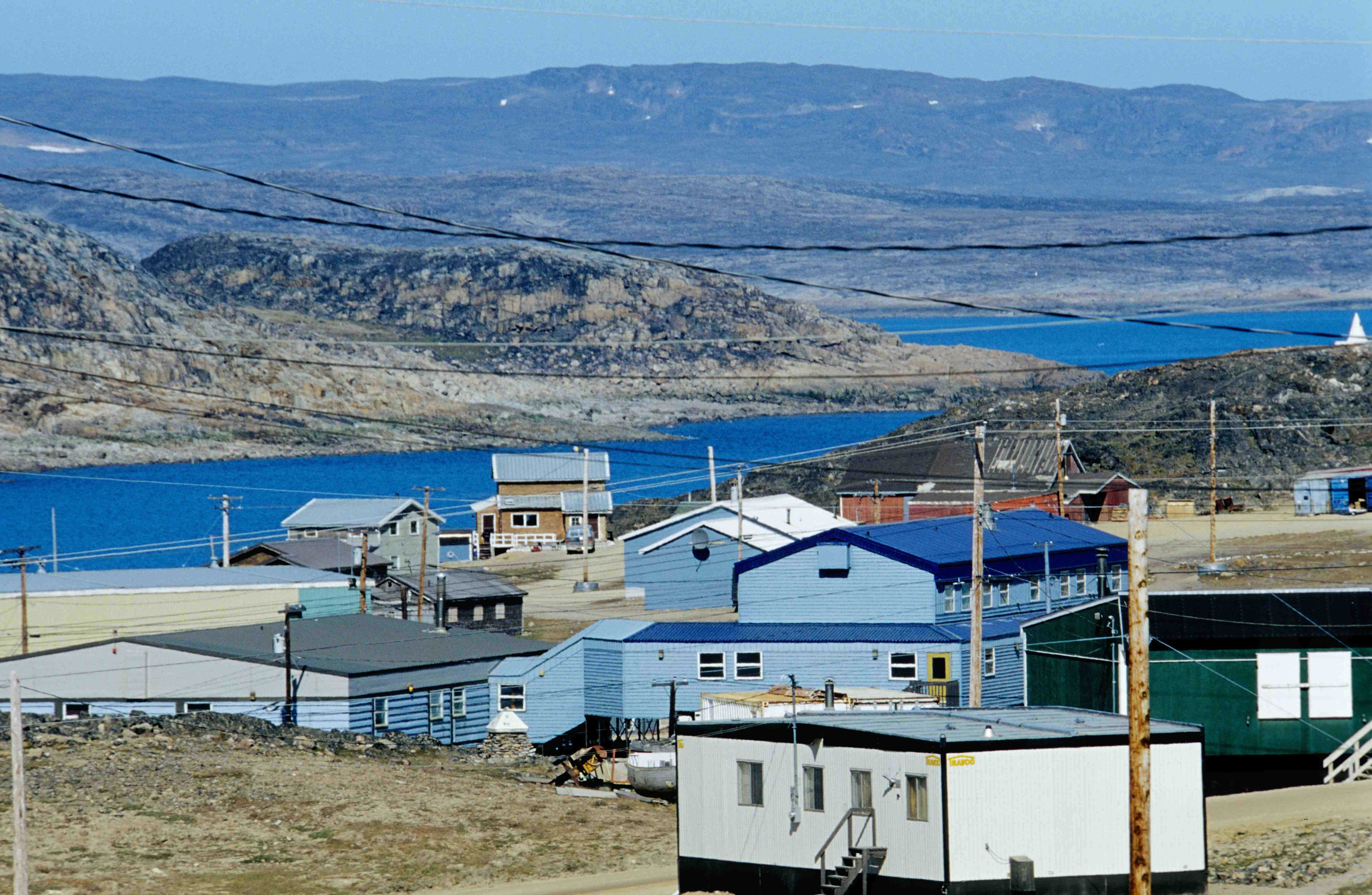

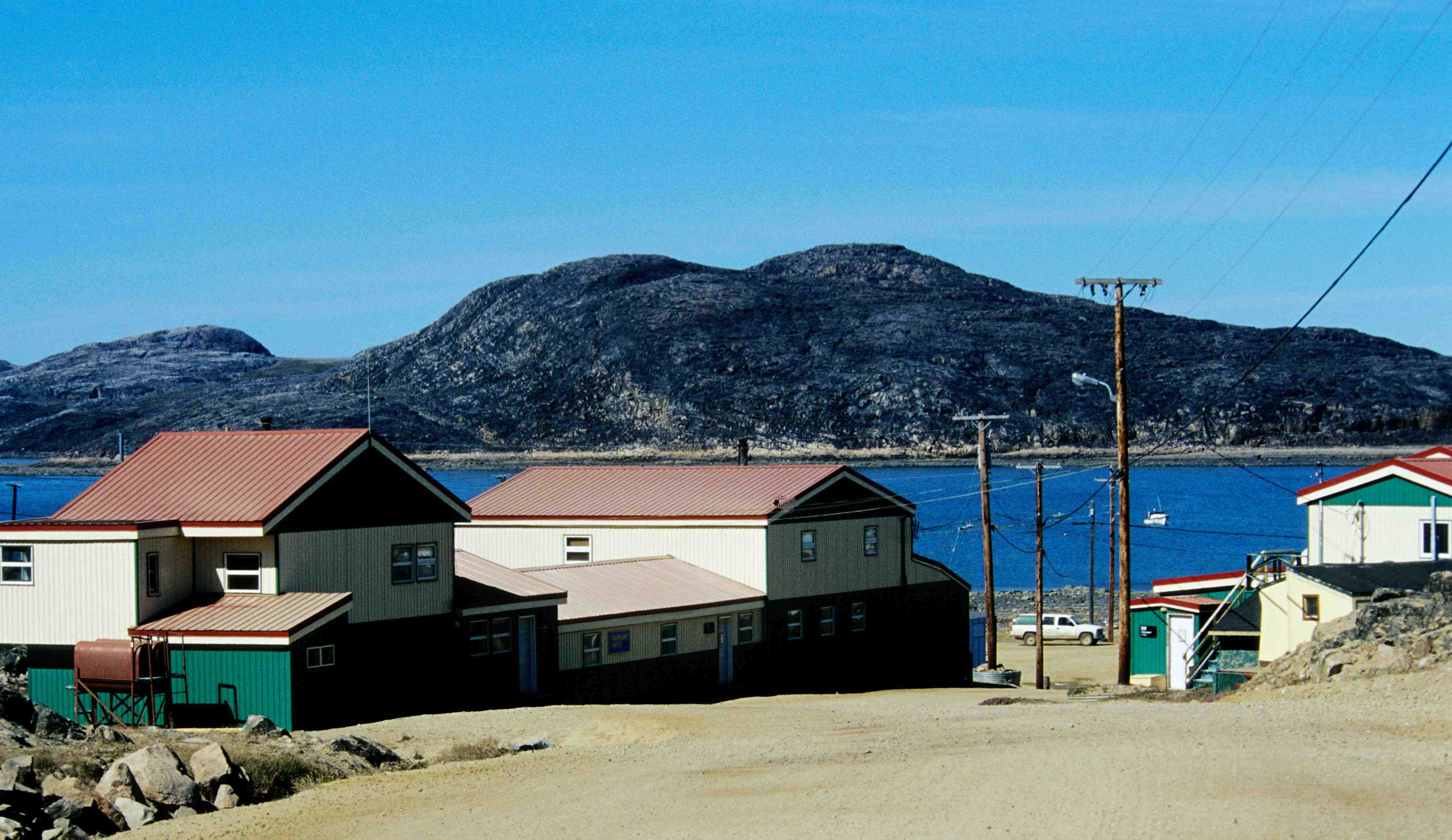

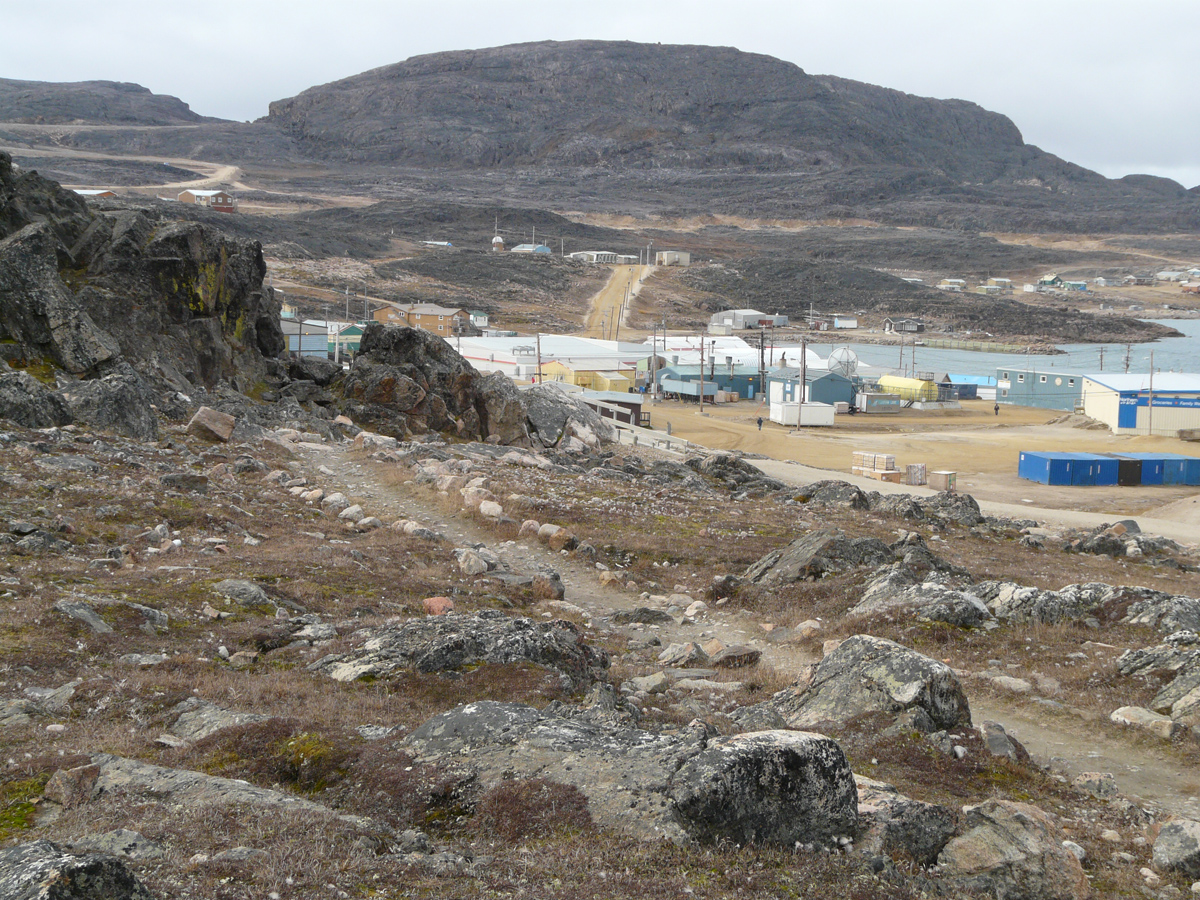

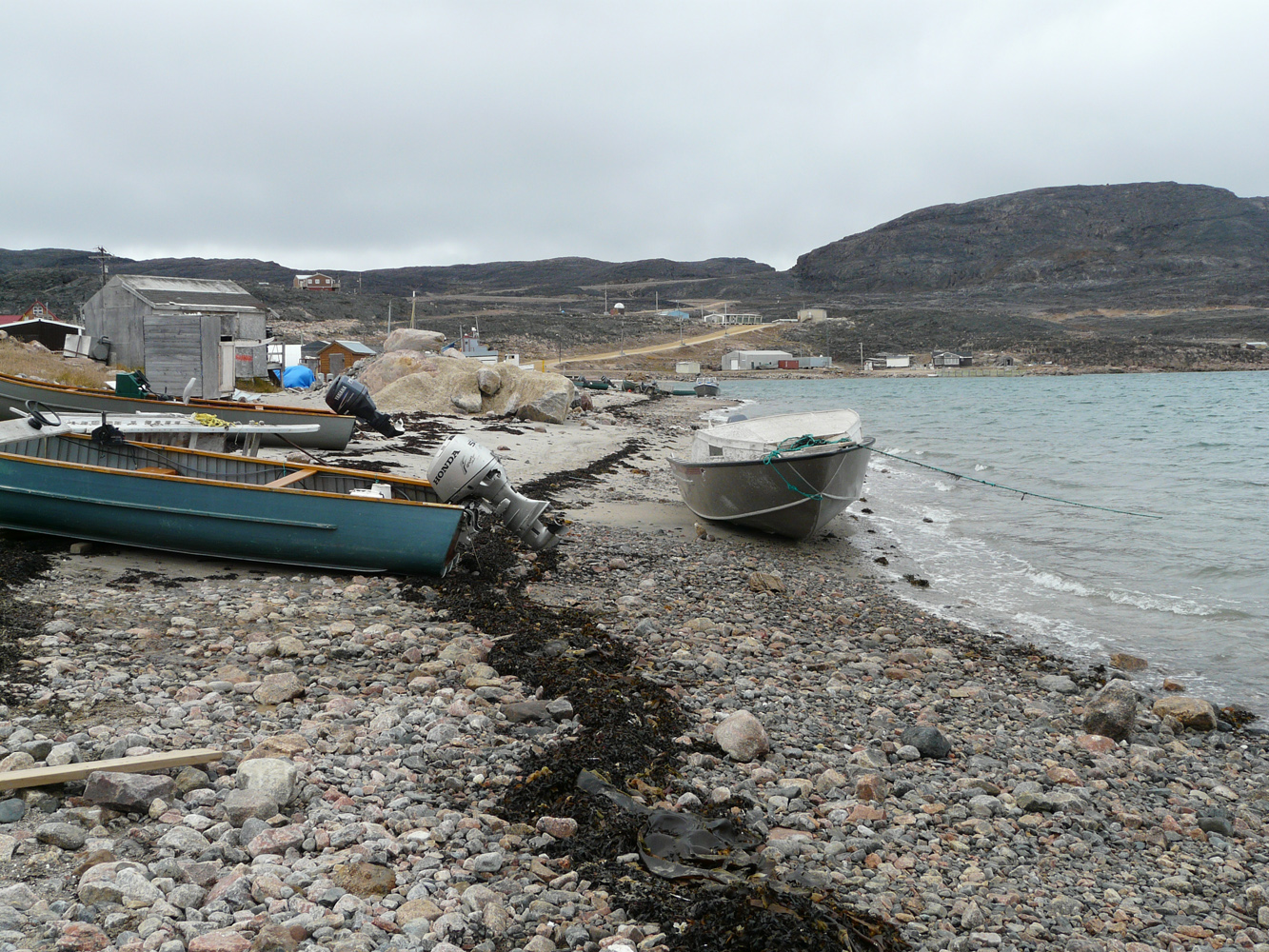

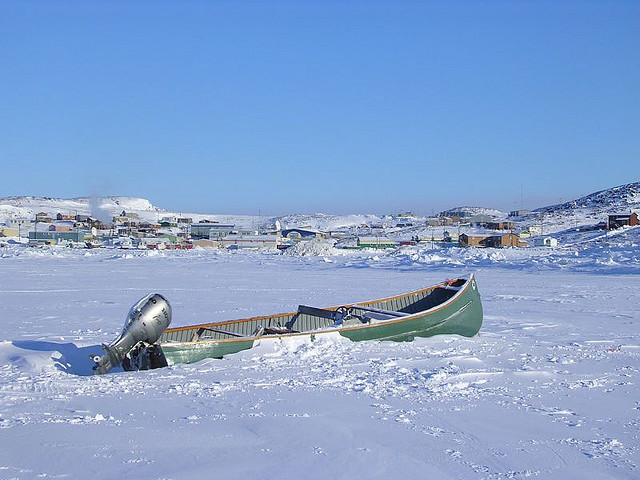

== Climate ==
Kinngait has a tundra climate (ET) with short but cool summers and long cold winters.

Climate data for Kinngait (Kinngait Airport) WMO ID: 71910; coordinates 64°13′09″N 76°31′30″W; elevation: 48.2 m (158 ft); 1991–2020 normals, extremes 1963–present
Month	Jan	Feb	Mar	Apr	May	Jun	Jul	Aug	Sep	Oct	Nov	Dec	Year
Record high humidex	0.2	0.7	0.7	4.4	10.4	18.8	25.0	21.6	12.7	6.5	3.4	1.7	25.0
Record high °C (°F)	0.9 (33.6)	1.9 (35.4)	0.8 (33.4)	5.6 (42.1)	10.9 (51.6)	19.7 (67.5)	25.0 (77.0)	21.9 (71.4)	18.1 (64.6)	7.1 (44.8)	3.4 (38.1)	2.2 (36.0)	25.0 (77.0)
Mean daily maximum °C (°F)	−20.7 (−5.3)	−21.6 (−6.9)	−17.4 (0.7)	−9.2 (15.4)	−1.9 (28.6)	5.7 (42.3)	12.1 (53.8)	9.9 (49.8)	4.1 (39.4)	−1.0 (30.2)	−7.2 (19.0)	−14.2 (6.4)	−5.1 (22.8)
Daily mean °C (°F)	−23.7 (−10.7)	−24.4 (−11.9)	−20.7 (−5.3)	−12.4 (9.7)	−4.2 (24.4)	2.9 (37.2)	8.3 (46.9)	6.8 (44.2)	2.2 (36.0)	−2.7 (27.1)	−9.5 (14.9)	−17.1 (1.2)	−7.9 (17.8)
Mean daily minimum °C (°F)	−26.3 (−15.3)	−27.1 (−16.8)	−23.9 (−11.0)	−15.5 (4.1)	−6.4 (20.5)	0.1 (32.2)	4.5 (40.1)	3.8 (38.8)	0.1 (32.2)	−4.4 (24.1)	−12.0 (10.4)	−19.8 (−3.6)	−10.6 (12.9)
Record low °C (°F)	−38.9 (−38.0)	−40.6 (−41.1)	−42.2 (−44.0)	−32.8 (−27.0)	−19.6 (−3.3)	−7.4 (18.7)	−3.4 (25.9)	−4.6 (23.7)	−8.3 (17.1)	−23.9 (−11.0)	−30.6 (−23.1)	−42.8 (−45.0)	−42.8 (−45.0)
Record low wind chill	−54.5	−58.1	−53.0	−44.6	−29.3	−14.6	−7.0	−8.7	−14.7	−39.7	−40.1	−51.4	−58.1
Average precipitation mm (inches)	19.4 (0.76)	17.2 (0.68)	26.1 (1.03)	25.8 (1.02)	27.8 (1.09)	33.3 (1.31)	39.0 (1.54)	57.3 (2.26)	52.9 (2.08)	48.0 (1.89)	37.0 (1.46)	29.6 (1.17)	413.2 (16.27)
Average rainfall mm (inches)	0.0 (0.0)	0.0 (0.0)	0.0 (0.0)	0.3 (0.01)	4.0 (0.16)	20.9 (0.82)	37.8 (1.49)	52.1 (2.05)	35.7 (1.41)	7.2 (0.28)	0.0 (0.0)	0.0 (0.0)	158.0 (6.22)
Average snowfall cm (inches)	24.2 (9.5)	24.2 (9.5)	28.3 (11.1)	32.8 (12.9)	29.7 (11.7)	8.5 (3.3)	0.2 (0.1)	1.2 (0.5)	13.2 (5.2)	40.1 (15.8)	50.6 (19.9)	37.6 (14.8)	290.7 (114.4)
Average precipitation days (≥ 0.2 mm)	15.2	13.0	15.7	14.0	12.7	10.1	11.1	13.0	15.7	17.5	19.0	18.2	175.1
Average rainy days (≥ 0.2 mm)	0.0	0.0	0.0	0.4	1.9	6.8	11.4	13.3	10.6	3.2	0.1	0.0	47.8
Average snowy days (≥ 0.2 cm)	16.0	14.5	15.3	14.4	14.6	4.8	0.1	0.4	6.9	17.8	19.8	19.0	143.6
Average relative humidity (%) (at 1500 LST)	72.7	71.7	72.8	78.1	83.1	77.0	69.8	75.6	81.4	84.4	83.6	79.2	77.4
Mean monthly sunshine hours	7.6	72.5	172.6	215.7	157.0	220.1	274.1	187.3	87.4	45.2	17.6	0.0	1,457.2
Percentage possible sunshine	4.5	30.3	47.5	47.8	27.5	35.1	44.9	36.8	22.2	14.9	9.0	0.0	26.7
Source: Environment and Climate Change Canada (rain/rain days, snow/snow days 1981–2010) Canadian Climate Normals 1981–2010

== See also ==
- List of municipalities in Nunavut
