= Herold =

Herold may refer to:

== People ==
Given name

- Herold Driedger (born 1942), Canadian politician
- Hérold Goulon (born 1988), French footballer
- Herold C. Hunt (1902–1976), American educator
- Herold Jansson (1899–1965), Danish gymnast and diver
- Herold Truffer (born 1936), Swiss ice hockey player
- Herold J. Weiler (1886–1945), United States Army officer, acting Chief of the National Guard Bureau

Surname

- Herold (surname)

== Places ==
- Herold, Germany
- Herold, Western Cape, South Africa
- Herold, West Virginia, United States
- Herold, Wisconsin, United States

== Other uses ==
- Herold (beer), made in Březnice, Czech Republic
- Cyclone Herold, affecting Madagascar and the Mascarene Islands in March 2020
- Milwaukee Herold, a newspaper
- Herold Manufacturing Company, defunct American camera and clock manufacturer

== See also ==
- Harald (disambiguation)
- Herald (disambiguation)
- Harold (disambiguation)
