= List of ships named Herald =

A number of sailing ships have been named Herald, for the Herald:

- Herald was launched at Newburyport, Massachusetts in 1797. The US Navy purchased her from Edward Davis in 1798 and sold her in 1801. She became the French 20-gun privateer corvette Africaine. In 1804 a British privateer seized her on 4 May 1804 at Charleston, South Carolina. The seizure gave rise to a case in the U.S. courts that defined the limits of U.S. territorial waters. The U.S. courts ruled that the privateer had seized Africaine outside U.S. jurisdiction. Africaine then became a Liverpool-based slave ship that made two voyages carrying slaves from West Africa to the West Indies. After the abolition of the slave trade in 1807 she became a West Indiaman that two French privateers captured in late 1807 or early 1808.
- Herald (1798 ship) acquired a letter of marque on 15 January 1798. On 24 February as she was entering the Bay of Naples, three French privateers attacked her; in a three-hour action she repelled the attack. In August she captured a Spanish ship, but in December 1798 or January 1799 five Spanish frigates captured Herald.
- Herald was a ship launched in 1799 at Whitby that the British Royal Navy purchased in 1803 and renamed HMS Scourge. The Navy sold her in 1816 and she returned to mercantile service under her original name. She was lost in 1835.
- Herald (1826 ship), was a 55-ton (bm) schooner, the first vessel built in New Zealand. Missionaries launched her in 1826, and she was wrecked in 1828.

== See also ==
- HMS Herald
- USS Herald
