= Alistair Mackay =

Scottish polar explorer (1878-1914)

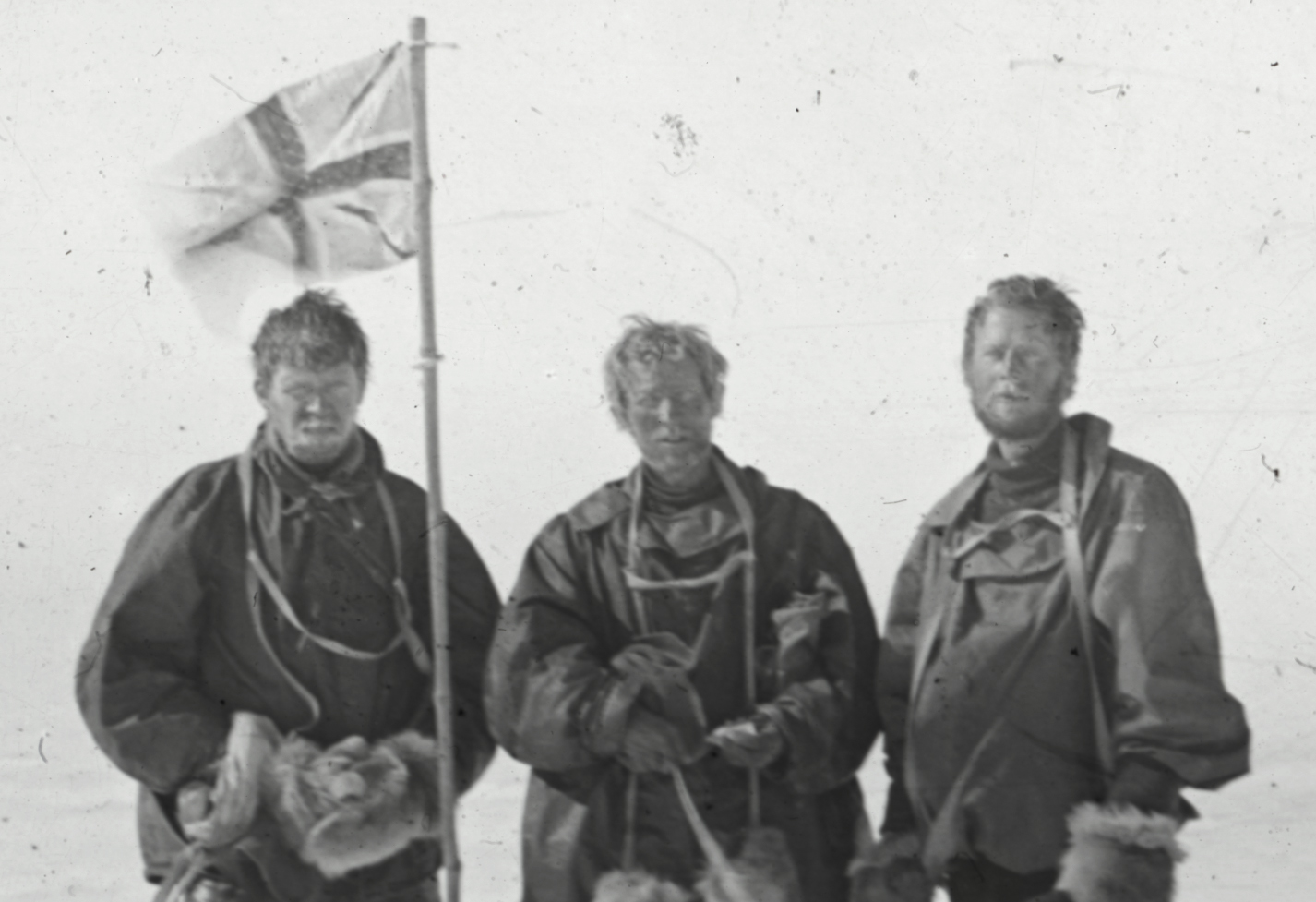
- Mackay, Edgeworth David, and Douglas Mawson at the South Magnetic Pole on 16 January 1909
- Born: Alistair Forbes Mackay; 22 February 1878; Carskey, Argyllshire, Scotland
- Died: c. February 1914 (aged 35) near Herald Island, Chukchi Sea
- Education: George Watson's College
- Alma mater: University of Edinburgh; University of Dundee
- Occupations: Physician, biologist, polar explorer
- Known for: First ascent of Mount Erebus; First to the South Magnetic Pole; Death during the Karluk expedition
- Awards: Silver Polar Medal (1909)
- Military career
- Allegiance: United Kingdom
- Branch: British Army, Royal Navy
- Service years: 1902–1906 (navy)
- Unit: South African Constabulary
- Wars: Second Boer War

Alistair Forbes Mackay (22 February 1878 – c. February 1914) was a Scottish physician, biologist, and polar explorer known for being the first, along with Australians Douglas Mawson and Edgeworth David, to reach the south magnetic pole on 16 January 1909, during the British Antarctic Expedition of 1907–1909.

== Polar exploration ==
=== British Antarctic Expedition, 1907–1909 ===
Mackay joined the British Antarctic Expedition of 1907–1909—led by Ernest Shackleton—as an expedition doctor. They arrived on the Nimrod at Cape Royds in Antarctica in February 1908, and set up camp in a small expedition hut that would house the 15-man party through the winter. In March, along with Douglas Mawson and Edgeworth David, Mackay made up the party who undertook the first ascent of Mount Erebus.

The following spring when Shackleton set off to attempt to reach the South Pole, he despatched Mackay, Mawson and David northward to reach the south magnetic pole, which lay approximately 650 kilometres (400 mi) north-north-west of Ross Island. The trek commenced on 5 October, with the men hauling their own sleds and relaying the loads which meant that every kilometre gained by the sledges involved them travelling three kilometres (1.9 mi) by foot.

For ten weeks, the men followed the coast north supplementing their stores with a diet of seals and penguins. They then crossed the Drygalski Ice Tongue and turned inland. They still faced a 700-kilometre (435 mi) return journey and established a depot to enable them to transfer their load to one overladen sled and to remove the need to relay. On 16 January 1909, they arrived at the South Magnetic Pole, took possession of the region for the British Crown. Mackay suggested three cheers for the King.

David had been appointed leader of the expedition by Shackleton, but by end of January with all three of the party experiencing severe physical deterioration, David was increasingly unable to contribute. On 31 January, with Mawson out of earshot, Mackay exerted his authority as the party's doctor and threatened to declare the professor insane unless he gave written authority of leadership to Mawson. Mawson reluctantly took command but by 30 February, he acknowledged in his diary that "the Prof was now certainly partly demented". That day the party reached the coast line with perfect timing as within 24 hours they were collected by the Nimrod for the return trip to Cape Royds.

The trio had covered a distance of 1,260 miles (2,030 km), which stood as the longest unsupported sled journey until the mid-1980s.

=== Canadian Arctic Expedition, 1913–1914 ===
Mackay was also the ship's doctor on the ill-fated Karluk expedition in 1913 led by Vilhjalmur Stefansson to explore the regions west of Parry Archipelago for the Government of Canada. After the Karluk, captained by Robert Bartlett, was stranded, crushed, and sunk by pack ice, Mackay and three other members of the crew died of exposure while struggling across the Arctic ice to reach Wrangel Island or Herald Island.
