= Herald (disambiguation) =

A herald is an officer of arms. It also means messenger.

Herald may also refer to:

== Geography ==
- Herald, California, United States
- Herald, Illinois, United States
- Herald Island (disambiguation)

== People ==
- Earl S. Herald (1914–1973), American ichthyologist and television presenter
- Toby Herald (born 1953), American politician
- William Herald (1900–1976), Australian freestyle swimmer

== Publications ==
- Herald (newspaper), a list of newspapers whose titles contain "Herald"
- Herald House, a Christian publishing company
- Herald: An Interactive Period Drama, a 2017 digital interactive story video game
- Herald (Community of Christ), the official periodical of Community of Christ
- Herald (Pakistan), a politics and current affairs magazine

== Music ==
- Herald AV Publications, a record label
- "The Herald", Op.34 No.11 Russian-language song by Sergei Rachmaninoff
- Herald (album), a 2021 album by Odette

== Vehicles ==
- Handley Page Dart Herald, an aircraft
- HMS Herald, the name of several Royal Navy ships
- PS Herald, an 1855-built paddle steamer ferry on Sydney Harbour
- Herald (ship), one of several vessels by that name
- Triumph Herald, a car

== Other uses ==
- The Herald, 1990 Iranian film starring Parviz Poorhosseini
- Herald (moth), a moth of the family Noctuidae
- Herald Investment Trust plc is a United Kingdom-based investment trust
- Mal Duncan aka The Herald, a character in Teen Titans
- Herald (Ancient Egypt), an Ancient Egyptian title

== See also ==
- The Herald (disambiguation)
- Harold (disambiguation)
- Harald (disambiguation)
- Heraldry
