= The Herald =

The Herald may refer to:

- The Herald (Glasgow), Scotland
- The Herald (Ireland)
- The Herald (Melbourne), Australia
- The Herald (Plymouth), England
- The Herald (Rock Hill), South Carolina, USA
- The New Zealand Herald
- The Herald and Weekly Times, Australia
- The Herald-Mail, Maryland, USA
- The Herald News, Massachusetts, USA
- The Herald-Times, Indiana, USA
- The Herald Democrat, Texas, USA
- The Herald Times Reporter, Wisconsin, USA
- The Everett Herald, Washington, USA
- The Herald-Palladium, Michigan, USA

== See also ==
- Daily Herald
- The Heralds, a novel by Brian Killick
- Herald (disambiguation)
