= Ada Blackjack =

Iñupiaq explorer (1898–1983)

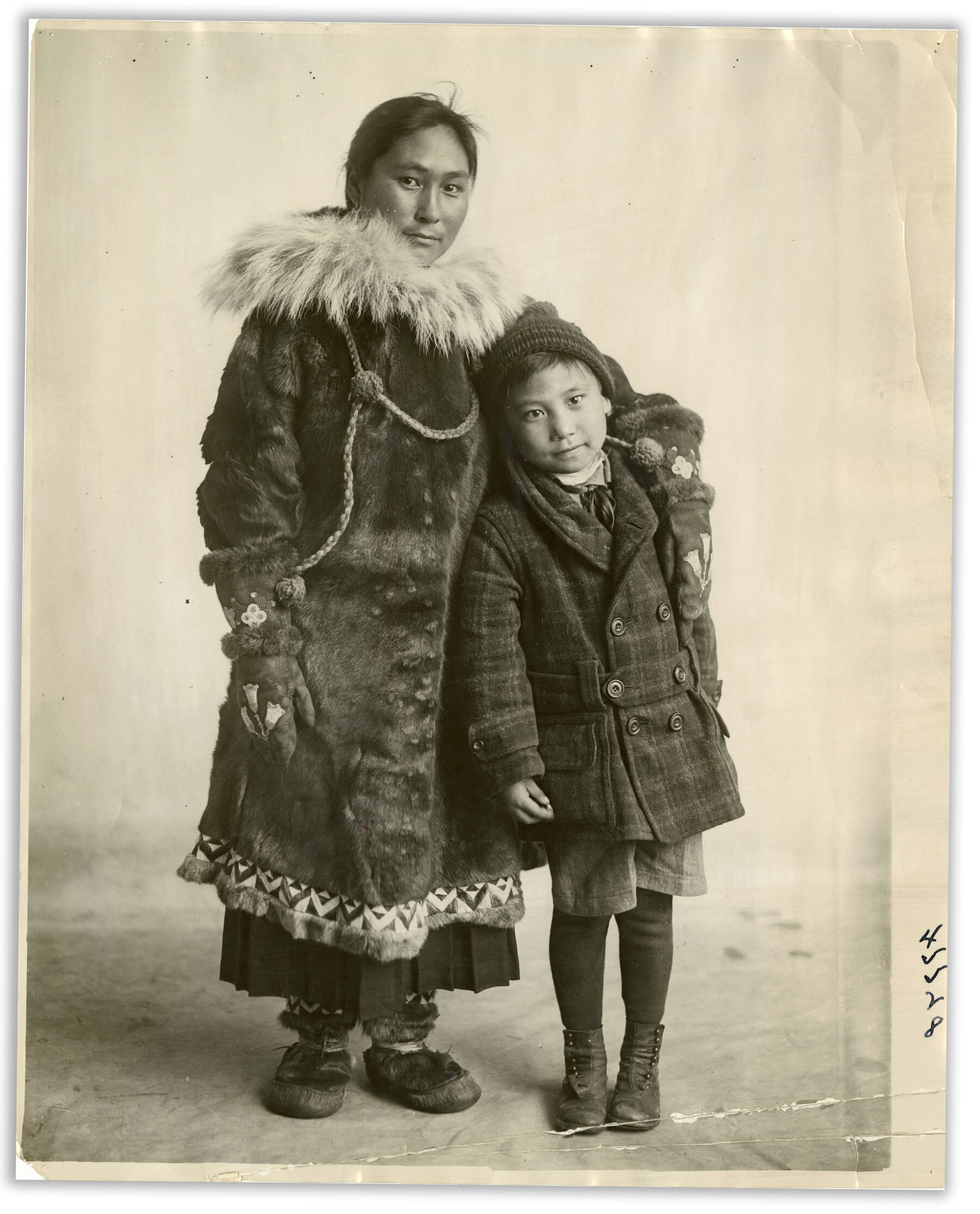
- Ada Blackjack with her son Bennett, 1923
- Born: Ada Delutuk; May 10, 1898; Solomon, Alaska, U.S.
- Died: May 29, 1983 (aged 85); Palmer, Alaska, U.S.

Ada Blackjack (née Delutuk; May 10, 1898 – May 29, 1983) was an Iñupiaq woman who accompanied an Arctic expedition to the uninhabited Wrangel Island, north of Siberia, eventually living alone on the island for eight months after the other expedition members left or died.

== Background ==
Ada Delutuk was born on May 10, 1898 or 1899, in the remote settlement of Spruce Creek, 8 mi (13 km) from Solomon, Alaska. Her father died of food poisoning when she was eight years old, and her mother sent her and her sister, Rita, to a Methodist mission school in Nome, Alaska. She was raised by missionaries who taught her to read English and sew. At age 16, she married Jack Blackjack, a former hunter and dogsled driver, and moved with him to the Seward Peninsula. The Blackjacks had three children, only one of whom survived infancy. Jack abused Ada, finally deserting her and their surviving son, Bennett. Ada Blackjack obtained a divorce before her husband could return and walked 40 miles (64 km) with Bennett to Nome, where her mother was living. To survive, Ada cleaned houses and sewed clothes for miners, but was still unable to afford Bennett's tuberculosis treatment. Due to this, she temporarily had to place Bennett in the Jesse Lee Home for Children, which could better care for his tuberculosis. Ada Blackjack became committed to making money to be reunited with her son.

Nome police chief E. R. Jordan was familiar with Ada's situation, so he mentioned to her that some men were recruiting Inuit to go with them on their Arctic expeditions across the Chukchi Sea to Wrangel Island. While Jordan was not familiar with the purpose of the expedition, he believed that Ada, who spoke English and was an excellent seamstress, might be a good fit for the mission, which needed someone to sew fur clothing for the team. The expedition was led by Canadian explorer Allan Crawford but financed, planned and encouraged by Vilhjalmur Stefansson. Stefansson remained behind to fundraise for another exploration to search for a continent north of Wrangel Island. He believed that the Arctic would be easily habitable for those willing to adapt.

== Expedition ==
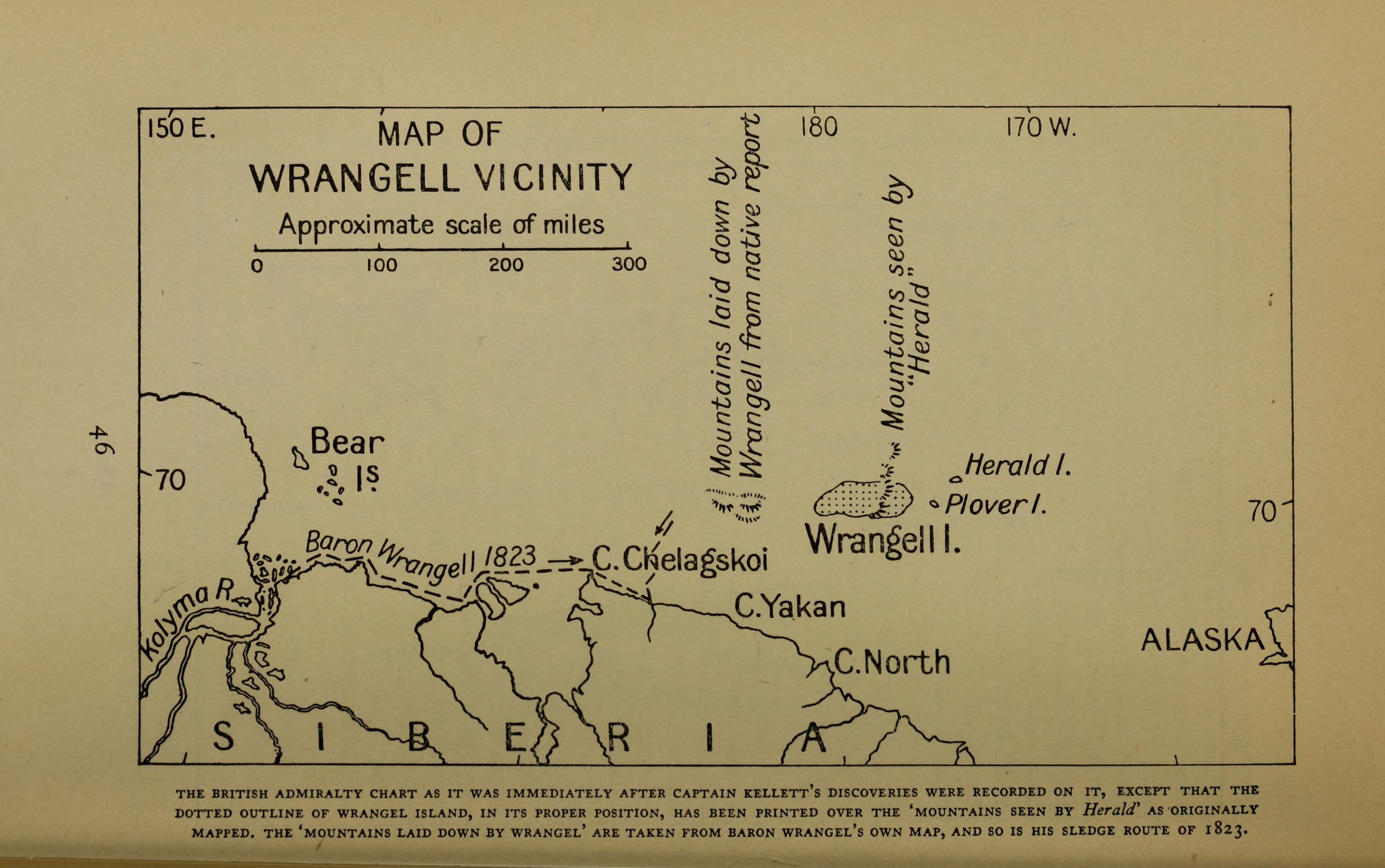
Map of Wrangell Vicinity

If anything happen to me and my death is known, there is black stirp [sic] for Bennett school book bag, for my only son. I wish if you please take everything to Bennett that is belong to me.

— Ada Blackjack, diary entry, 2 April 1923

Stefansson sent five settlers (one European Canadian, three European Americans, and one Iñupiaq, Blackjack) in a speculative attempt to claim the island for Canada. The explorers were handpicked by Stefansson based upon their previous experience and academic credentials. Stefansson considered those with advanced knowledge in the fields of geography and other sciences for the expedition.

On 15 September 1921, the team was left on Wrangel Island north of Siberia, to claim the island for Canada or the United Kingdom. Blackjack had many misgivings about joining the expedition, especially because she had been misled to believe she would be only one of many Alaska Native people to join the crew. The team included five people: Blackjack, who had been hired as a cook and seamstress; the American men Lorne Knight, Milton Galle, and Fred Maurer; and Allan Crawford. Maurer had spent eight months on the island in 1914 after surviving the shipwreck of the Karluk.

The conditions on the island were adequate at first, but after a year turned for the worse. Rations ran out, and the team was unable to kill enough game on the island to survive. On January 28, 1923, three of the men finally attempted to cross the 90 mi (140 km) frozen Chukchi Sea to Siberia for help and food, leaving Blackjack and the ailing Knight behind. Knight was affected by scurvy and was cared for by Blackjack until he died on June 23, 1923. The other three men were never seen again, and so Blackjack was alone, except for the expedition's cat, Victoria. Blackjack survived in the extremely cold conditions for eight months, learning to hunt foxes, build boats, and sew parkas out of reindeer skin.

She was rescued on August 19, 1923 by a former colleague of Stefansson's, Harold Noice who arrived on the schooner Donaldson. As he set foot on shore, Blackjack's first comment was: "Why is Mr. Galle, Mr Crawford and Mr Maurer not with you"? which surprised Noice, since he had expected to find precisely these men in the camp here with Blackjack, together with the fifth member of the expedition, Lorne Knight. He replies: "Are they not here"? whereupon Blackjack says: "I am alone here." She explains that Crawford, Galle and Maurer had left the camp half a year ago with all the dogs. Noice accompanies her to the small tent, and would later say: "I do not understand how anyone could have survived in such misery for a longer amount of time" but added "She was such an expert at dominating nature that she probably could have survived there for a year longer."

Some newspapers hailed her as the real "female Robinson Crusoe".

Blackjack used the money she saved to take her son to Seattle, Washington, to treat his tuberculosis. She remarried and had another son, Billy. Eventually, she returned to the Arctic, where she lived until the age of 85.

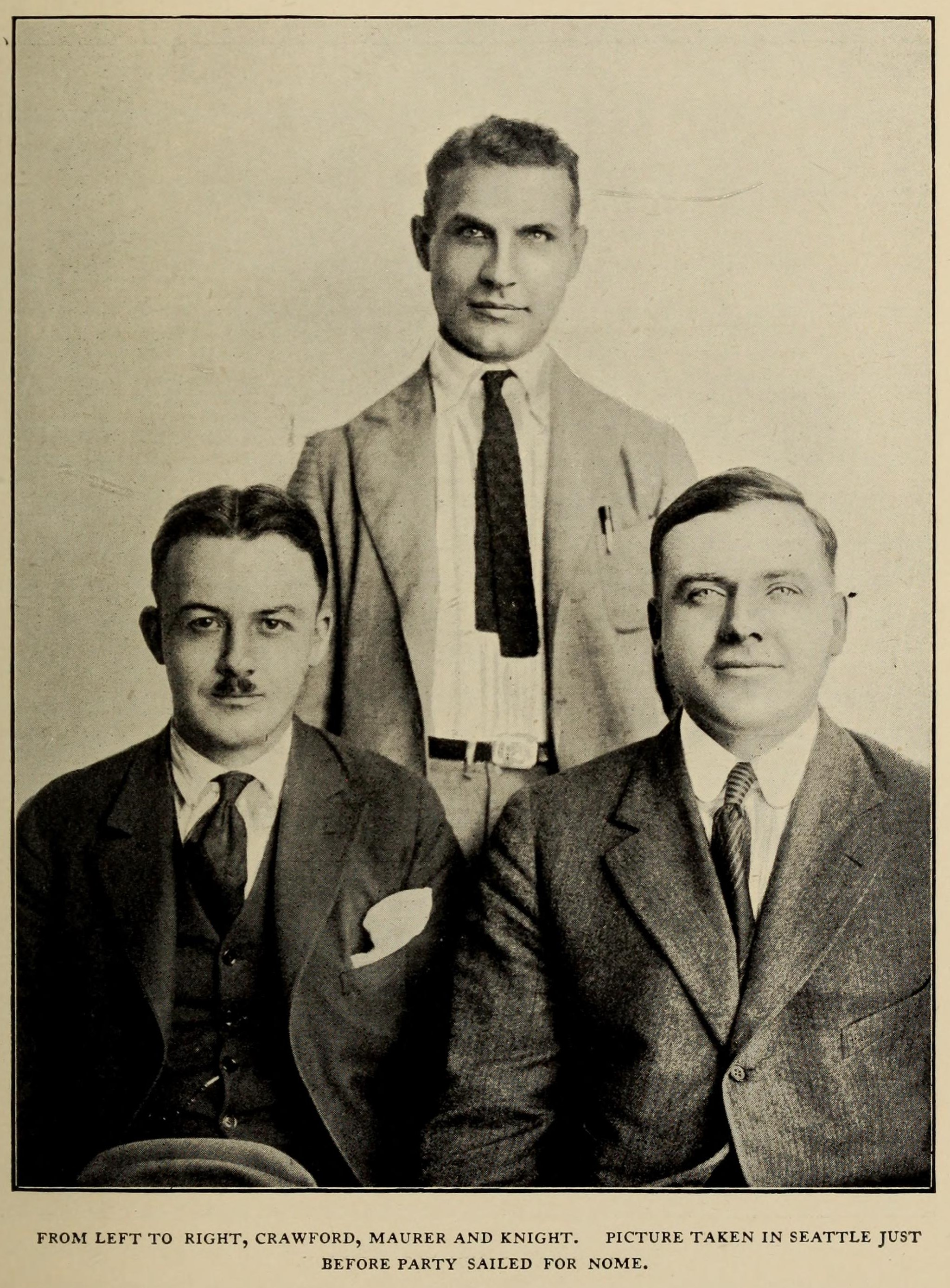
Crawford, Maurer and Knight. Picture taken in Seattle just before party sailed for Nome

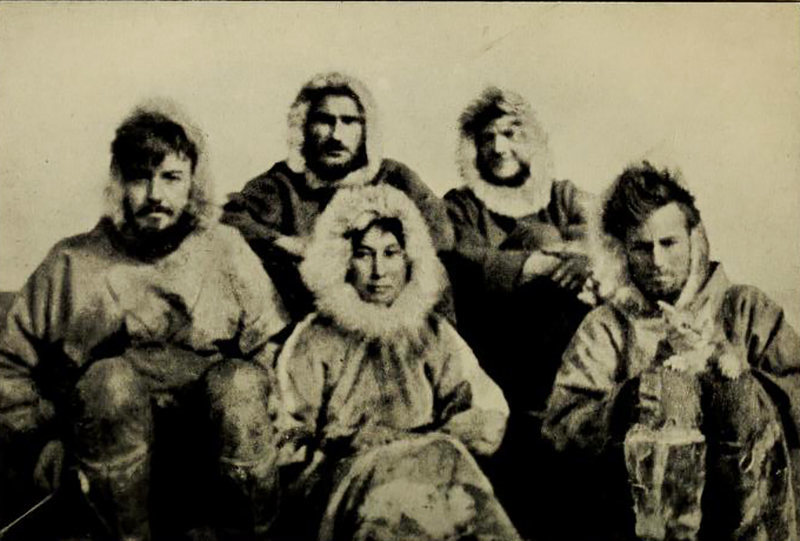
1921 Wrangel Island Expedition team

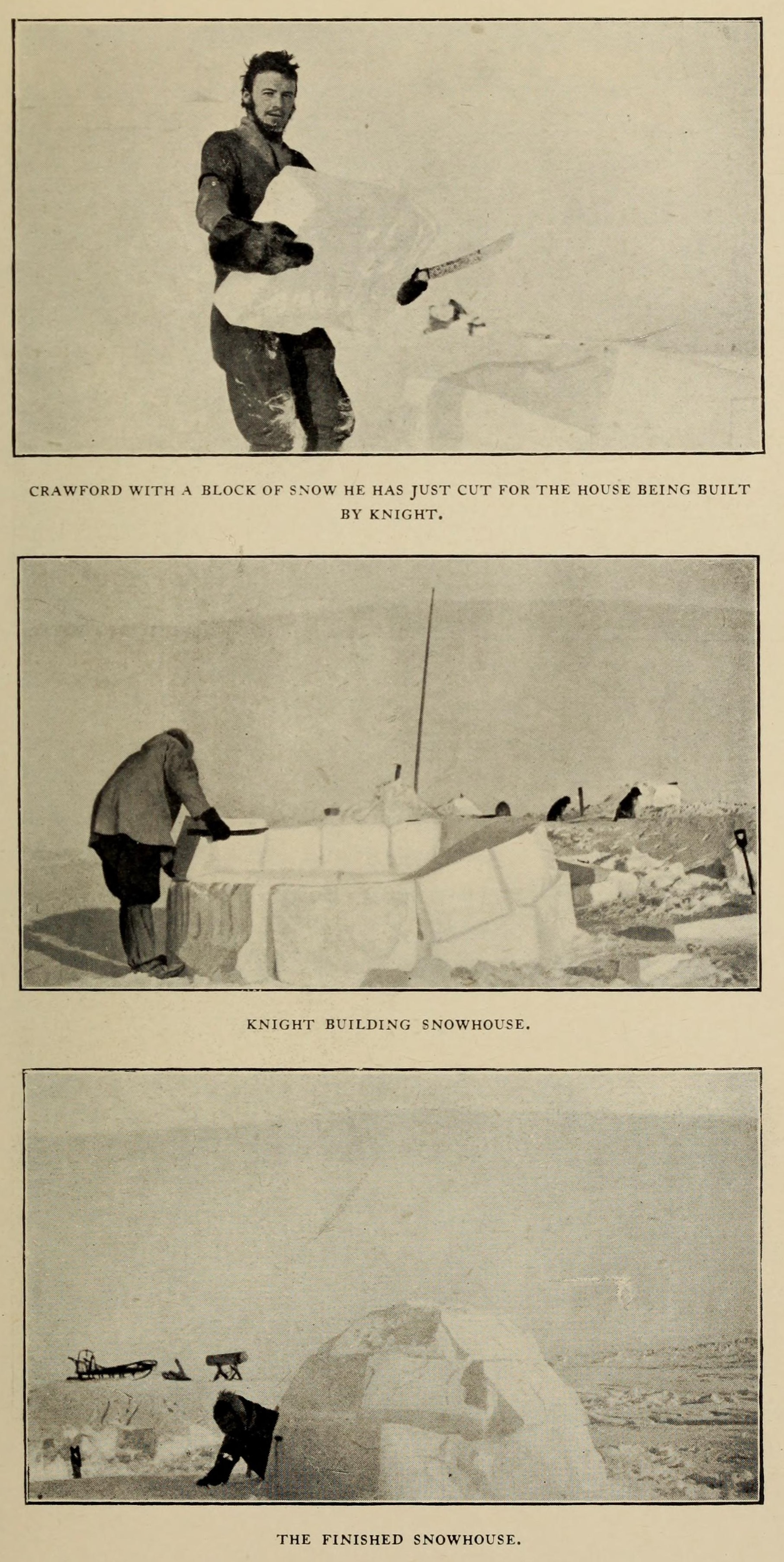
Building of a snowhouse

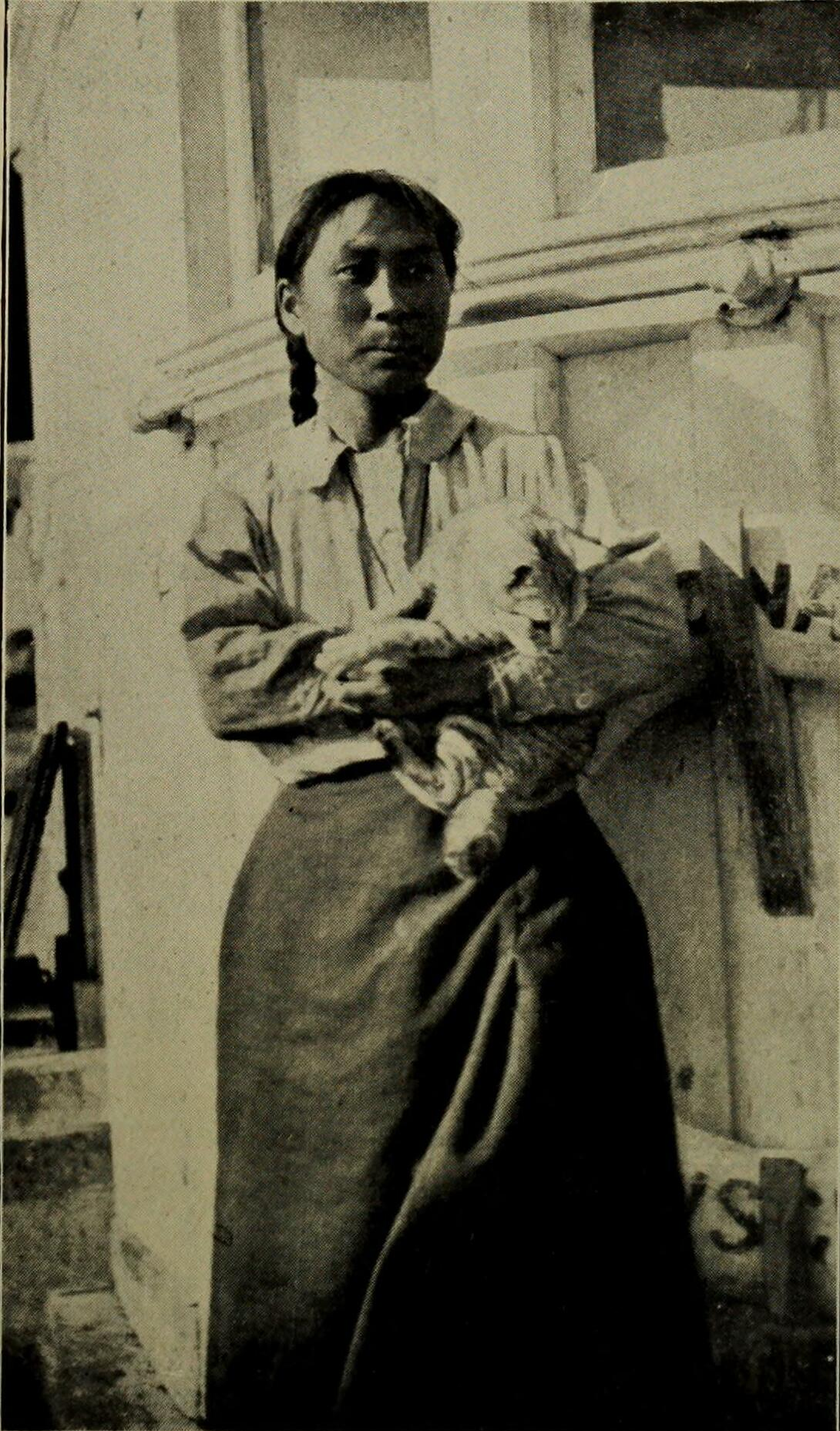
Ada Blackjack and Victoria on Donaldson

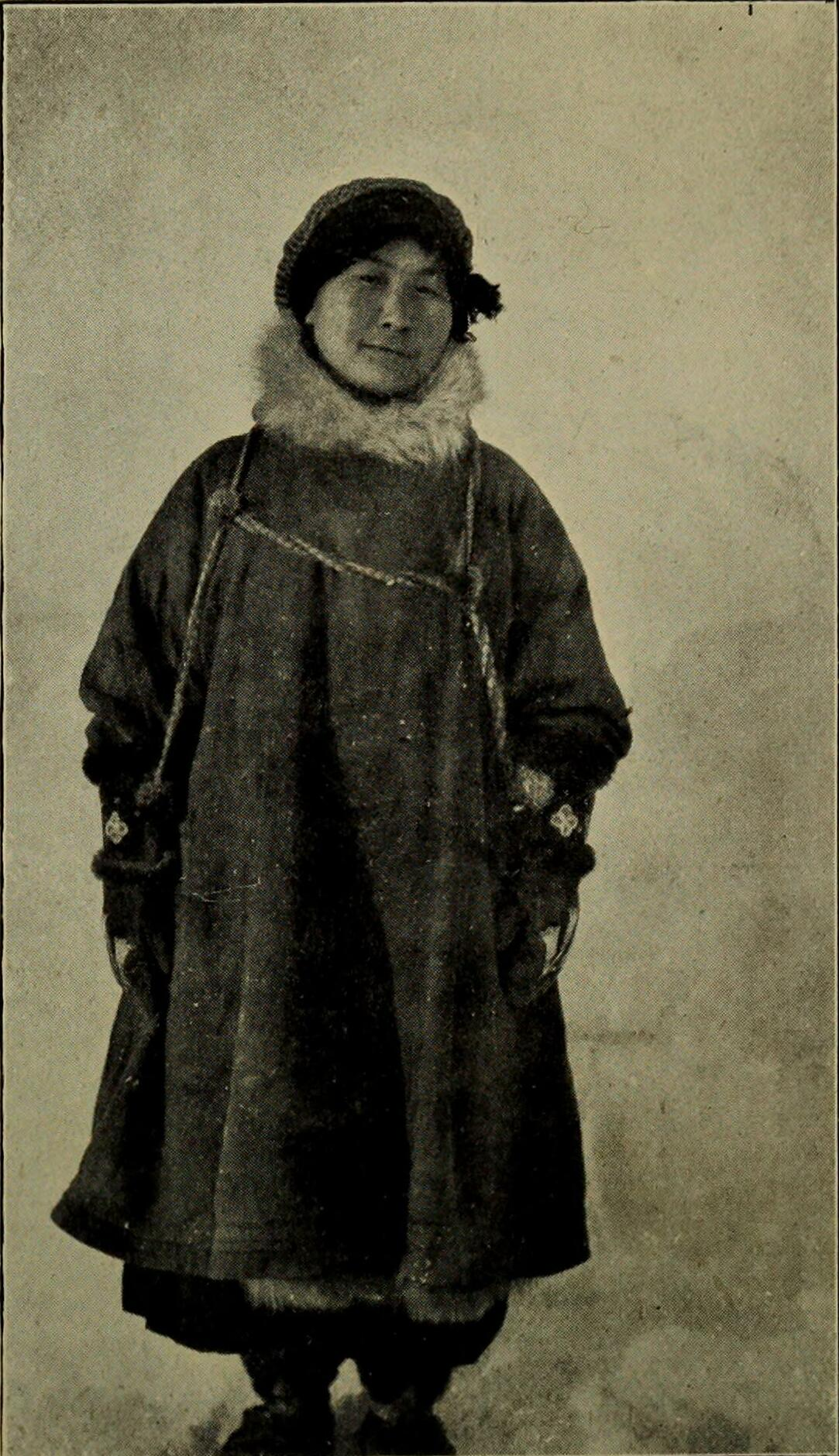
Ada Blackjack in winter costume

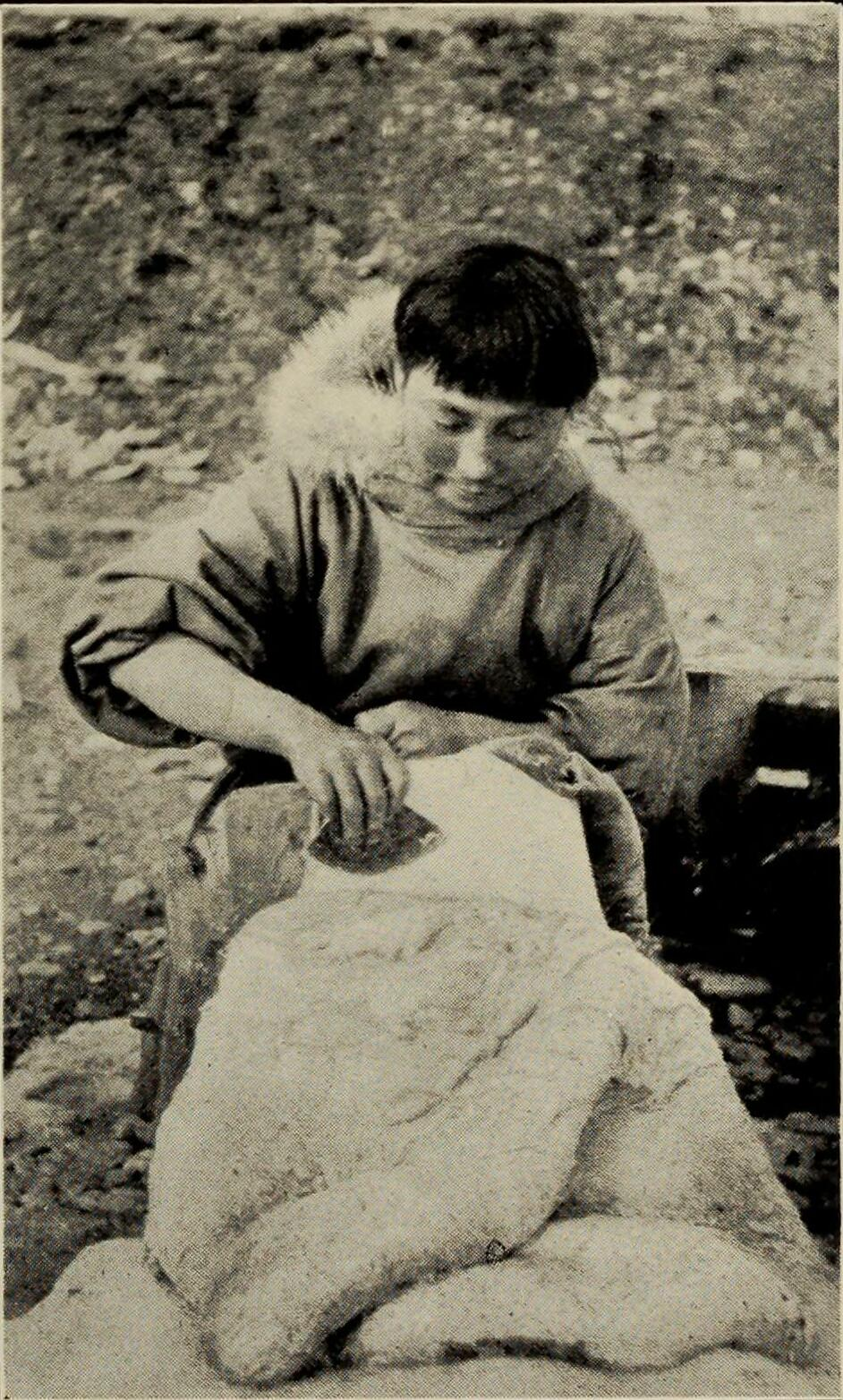
Ada Blackjack removing blubber from a sealskin

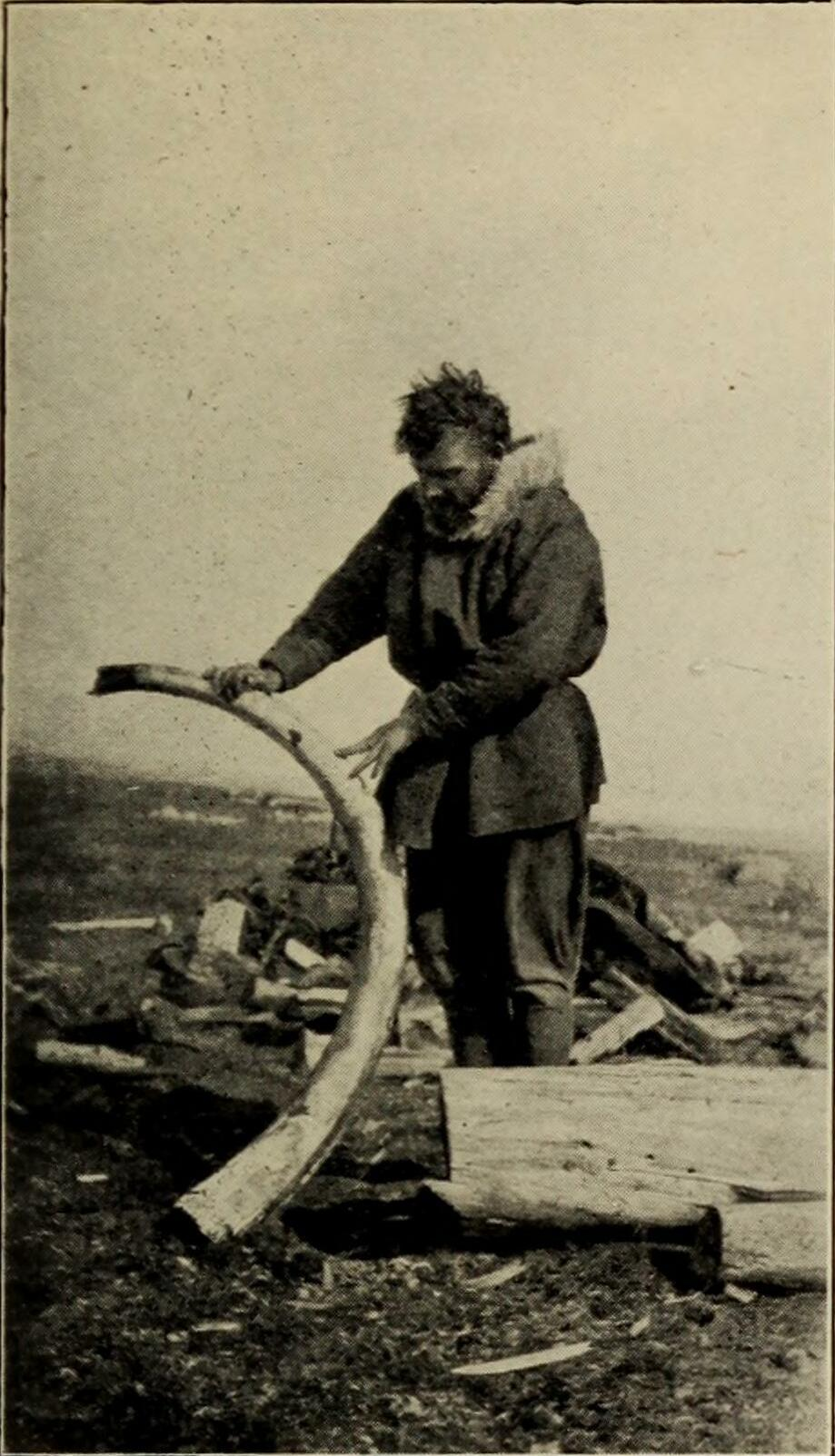
Knight with a Mammoth tusk found on Wrangel Island

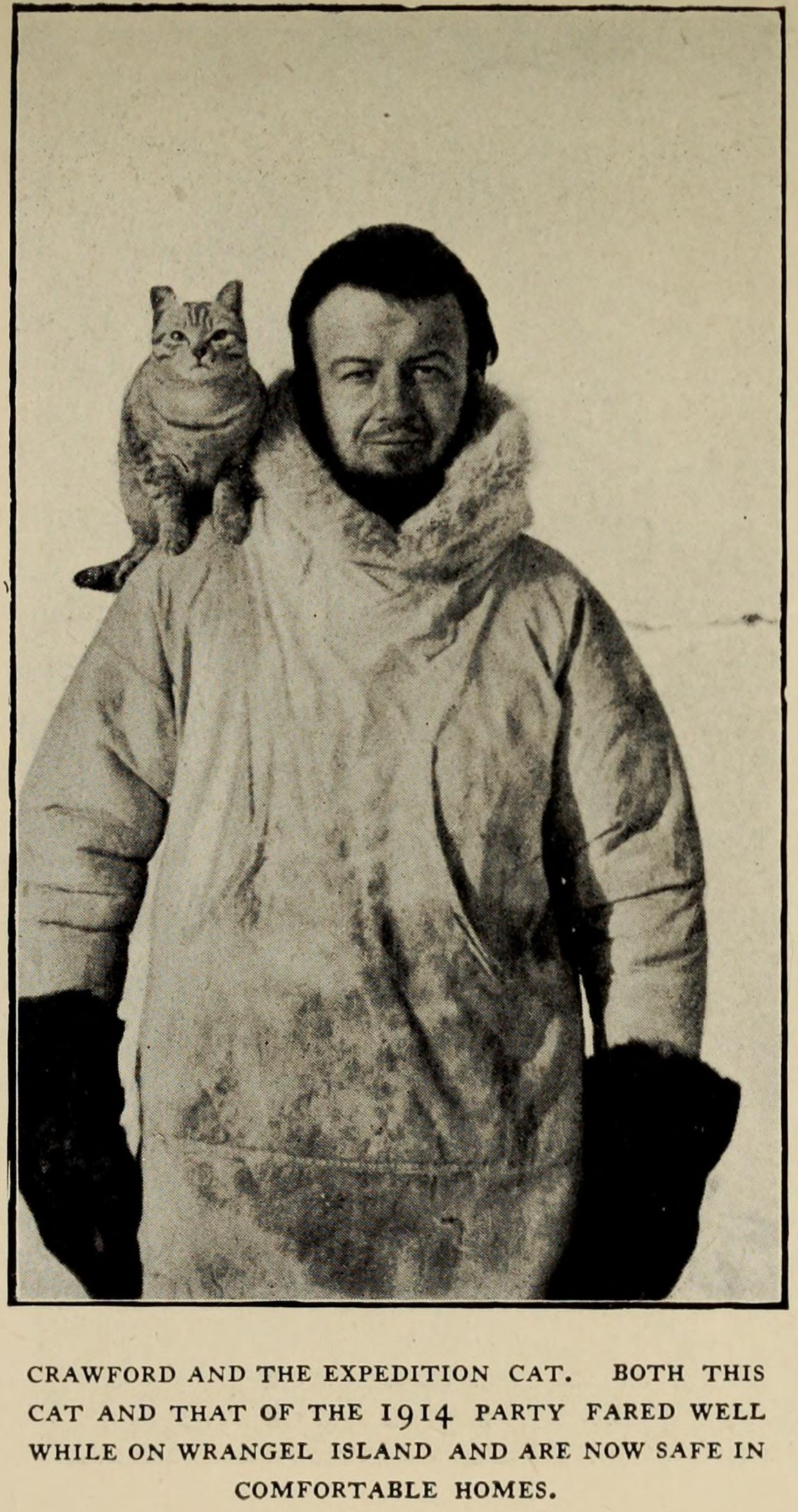
Crawford and the expedition cat Vic

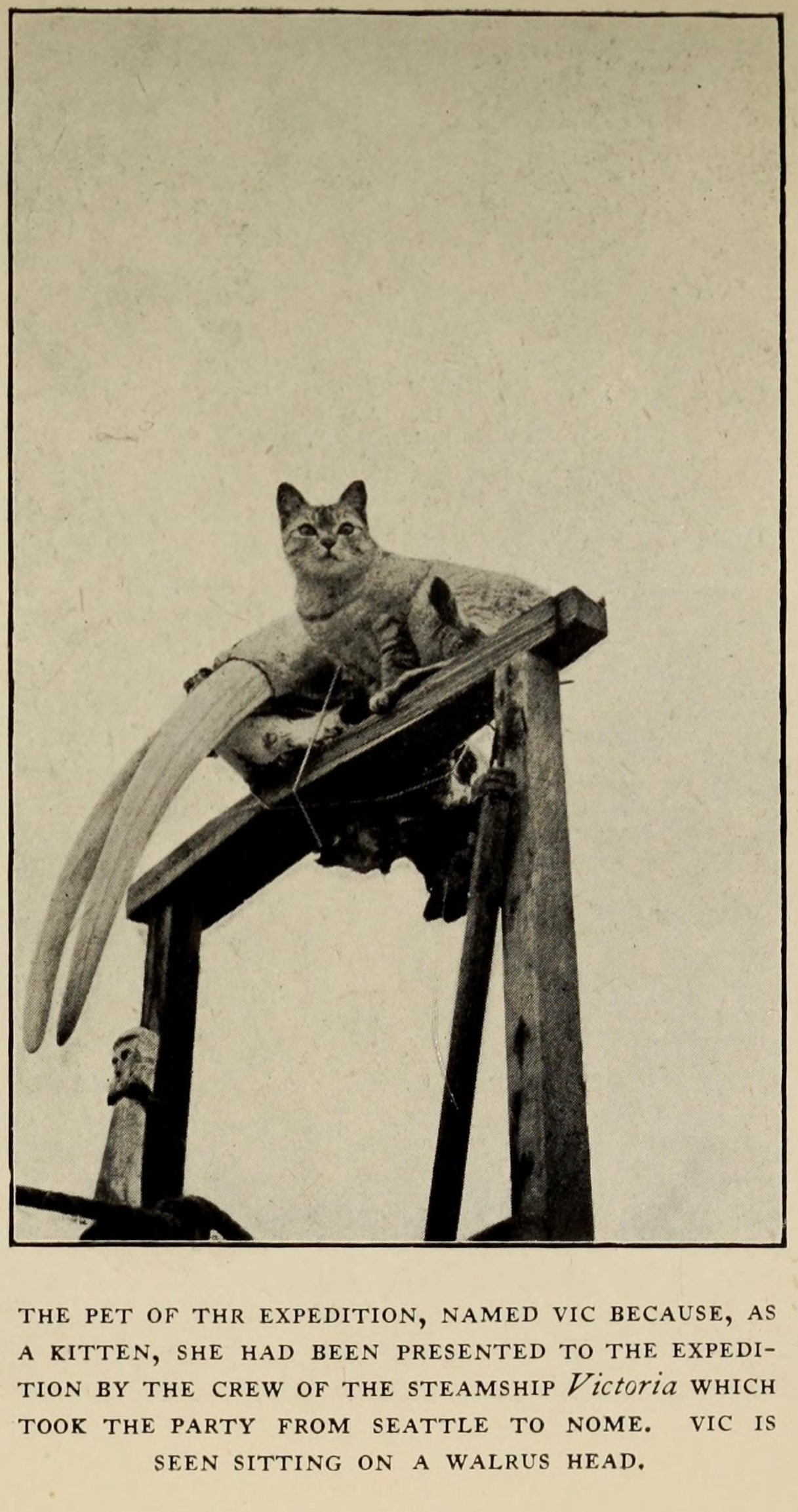
Vic sitting on a walrus head

== Last years ==
Blackjack was a quiet person and hated the media circus that developed around her and the attempts by Stefansson and her rescuer Noice to exploit her story. Except for her expedition salary and a few hundred dollars she had earned for the furs she trapped on Wrangel, Blackjack did not benefit from her ordeal and received no compensation from the books that were written about her.

Blackjack died in the state retirement facility, the Pioneer Home, in Palmer, Alaska, and was buried in Anchorage. Her gravestone includes a plaque reading "Heroine--Wrangel Island Expedition".
