= Last voyage of the Karluk =

1913 loss of Canadian expedition ship

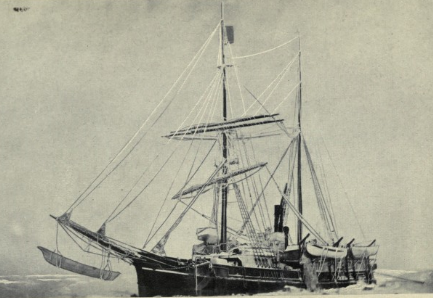
Karluk caught in ice, August 1913

The last voyage of the Karluk, flagship of the Canadian Arctic Expedition of 1913–1916, ended with the loss of the ship in the Arctic seas, and the subsequent deaths of nearly half her complement of 25.

In August 1913, Karluk, a brigantine formerly used as a whaler, became trapped in the ice while sailing to a rendezvous point at Herschel Island. After a long drift across the Beaufort and Chukchi seas, in January 1914 the ship was crushed and sank. In the ensuing months, the crew and expedition staff struggled to survive, first on the ice and later on the shores of Wrangel Island. In all, eleven men died before being rescued.

The Canadian Arctic Expedition was organised under the leadership of Canadian anthropologist Vilhjalmur Stefansson, and had both scientific and geographic purposes. Shortly after Karluk was trapped, Stefansson left the ship with a small party, claiming that he intended to hunt for caribou. The ice then carried Karluk westwards. Upon reaching land Stefansson devoted himself to the expedition's scientific objectives, leaving the crew and staff on board the ship to their own devices under the charge of its captain, Robert Bartlett. Karluk sank 11 January 1914. After the sinking, Bartlett organised a march across the ice to Wrangel Island, 80 miles (130 km) away. (Note: In the absence of any indication within the sources, all distances have been treated as statute miles and converted to km on that basis.) Conditions were difficult and dangerous; two four-man parties were lost before the island was reached.

From the island, Bartlett and an Inuk companion, Kataktovik, set out across the frozen sea for the Siberian coast, in search of help. Assisted by local populations, the pair eventually reached Alaska, but sea ice conditions prevented any immediate rescue mission. On Wrangel Island, the stranded party survived by hunting game, but were short of food and troubled by internal dissent. Before their eventual rescue in September 1914, three more of the party had died, two of illness and one in violent circumstances; 14 were rescued.

Historians have divided views on Stefansson's decision to leave the ship. Some of the voyage's survivors were critical of his seeming indifference to their ordeal and the loss of their comrades. He escaped official censure, and was publicly honoured for his later work on the expedition despite the Canadian government's reservations about its overall management. Although Bartlett was criticised by an admiralty commission for taking Karluk into the ice, he was hailed as a hero by the public and by his former Karluk shipmates.

== Canadian Arctic Expedition ==
=== Background ===
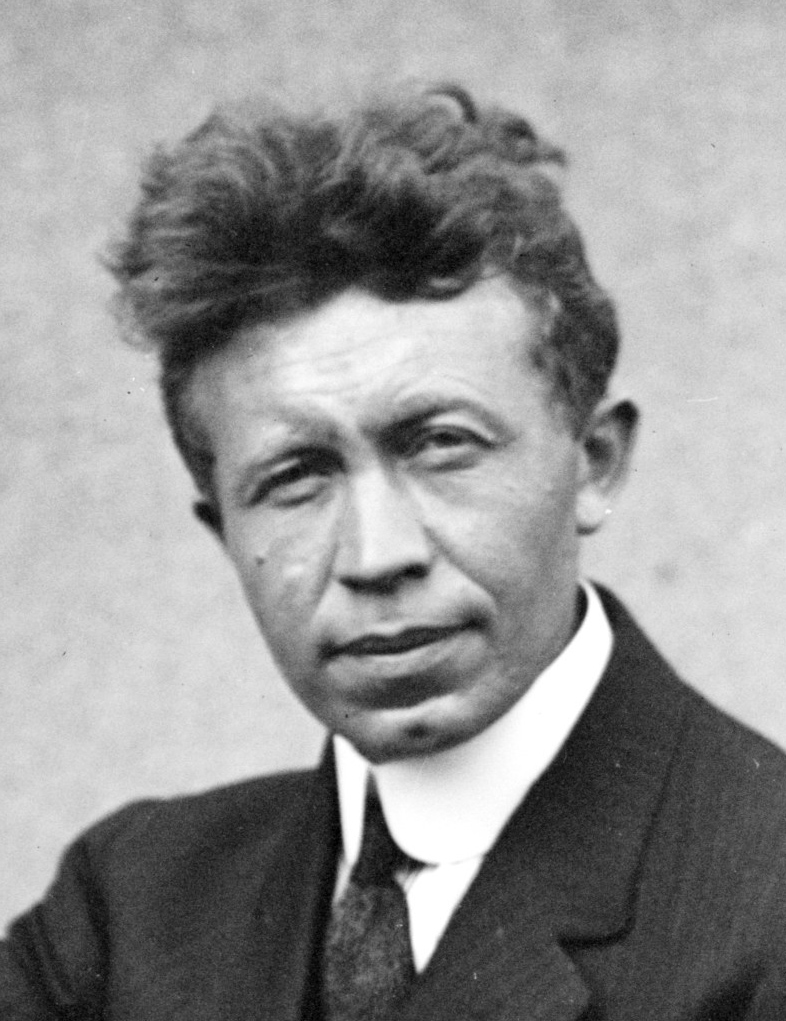
Vilhjalmur Stefansson, leader of the Canadian Arctic Expedition

The Canadian Arctic Expedition was the brainchild of Vilhjalmur Stefansson, a US-based, Canadian-born anthropologist of Icelandic extraction who had spent most of the years between 1906 and 1912 studying Inuit life in the remote Arctic Canada. His fieldwork had resulted in the first detailed information on the life and culture of the Copper Inuit, the so-called "blond Eskimos". Stefansson had returned home with plans for another expedition to continue his Arctic studies, and obtained promises of financial backing totalling US$45,000 (around US$750,000 in 2010) (Note: According to Measuringworth.com, the current value of projects (such as this expedition) should be calculated using the GDP deflator. By this method, $45,000 in 1913 is equivalent to $747,921 in 2010. On a consumer price index basis the conversion equivalent is $1,009,232.) from the National Geographic Society (NGS) in Washington and the American Museum of Natural History in New York. However, he wanted to extend his plans to include geographical exploration in the Beaufort Sea, then a blank space on the world's maps. For these expanded aims he needed more money, and approached the Canadian government for assistance.

The area known as the "High Arctic" was subject to claims of sovereignty not only from Canada, but also from Norway and the United States. The Canadian government was concerned that an American-financed expedition would give the United States a legal claim to any new land discovered in the Beaufort Sea, so when the Canadian prime minister Robert Borden met Stefansson in Ottawa in February 1913 he offered to assume financial responsibility for the entire expedition. Borden's government was hopeful that the expedition would strengthen Canada's claim to sovereignty over the Arctic islands. The American sponsors agreed to withdraw, subject to an NGS condition that the Society could reclaim its rights to the expedition if Stefansson failed to depart by June 1913. This created a narrow deadline and hurried preparations for the journey north, although Stefansson maintained in his 1921 account that "forethought appeared to have anticipated every eventuality".

=== Objectives and strategy ===
The Canadian government's financial involvement represented a shift in the expedition's emphasis, towards geographical exploration rather than the original purpose of ethnological and scientific studies. In a letter to the Canadian Victoria Daily Times, Stefansson set out these separate aims. The main object was to explore the "area of a million or so square miles that is represented by white patches on our map, lying between Alaska and the North Pole". The expedition also aimed to be the most comprehensive scientific study of the Arctic ever attempted. While a Northern Party searched for new lands, a mainly land-based Southern Party under zoologist Rudolph Anderson would carry out surveys and anthropological studies in the islands off the northern Canadian coast.

The Northern Party's ship, Karluk, would proceed north from the Canadian coast until it either found land or was stopped by ice. It would explore any land it encountered; otherwise it would follow the ice edge eastward and attempt to winter at either Banks Island or Prince Patrick Island. If the ship was trapped in the ice and forced to drift, the party would study the direction of Arctic currents and carry out oceanographic research. Meanwhile, Rudolph Anderson's party was expected to continue with the anthropological studies of the "blond Eskimo", to collect varieties of Arctic flora and fauna, to carry out geological research, and to seek open-water channels in the hope of establishing new trade routes.

=== Organisation and personnel ===
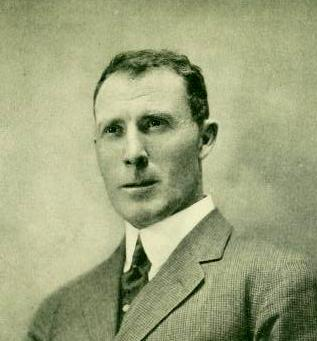
Captain Robert Bartlett, who commanded Karluk's last voyage

Stefansson's plan was to take the expedition to the old whaling station at Herschel Island off the Canadian Arctic coast, where the final composition of the Northern and Southern Parties would be decided and where equipment and supplies would be divided among the different strands of the venture. The haste to meet the NGS deadline led to concerns among the expedition's members about the adequacy of the provision of food, clothing and equipment. Stefansson, who was largely absent in the hectic weeks immediately before sailing and who revealed few of his plans to his team, dismissed such concerns as "impertinent and disloyal". There were disputes between Stefansson and the scientists over the chain of command; the Canadian Geological Survey, which had provided four scientists to the expedition, wanted these men to report to them rather than to Stefansson. Southern Party leader Rudolph Anderson threatened to resign over Stefansson's claim to the publication rights of all private expedition journals.

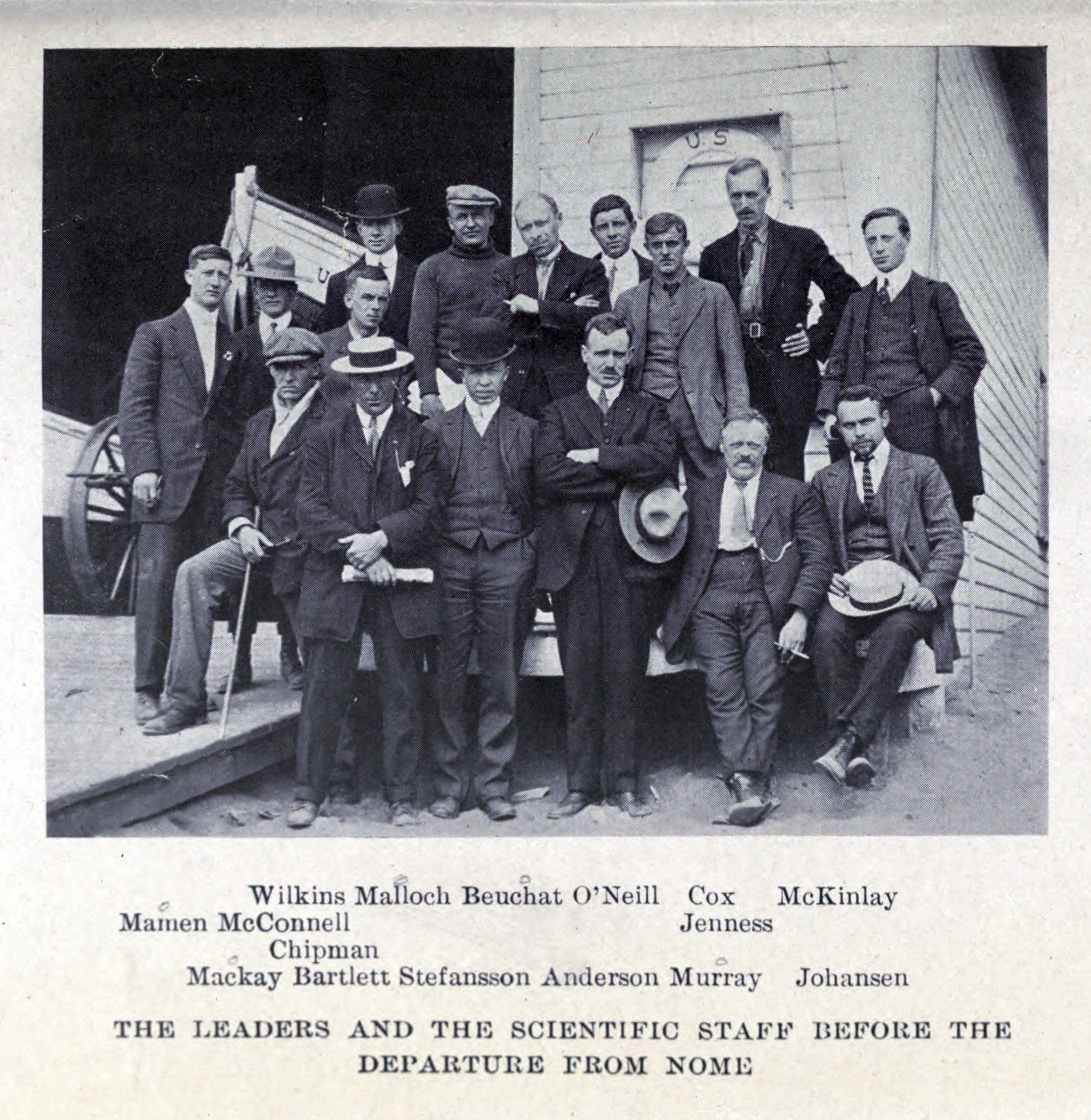
The expedition's scientific staff, with Stefansson and Bartlett. Malloch, Beuchat, McKinlay, Mamen, Mackay and Murray remained with Karluk; the others formed the Southern Party.

The scientific team, made up of some of the most distinguished men in their fields, included representatives from the United States, Denmark, Norway and France, as well as from Britain and its Empire. Only two, however, had previous polar experience: Alistair Forbes Mackay, the expedition's medical officer, had visited Antarctica with Sir Ernest Shackleton's Nimrod expedition in 1907–09, and had been one of the party of three to discover the location of the South Magnetic Pole. Another Nimrod veteran, the 46-year-old James Murray, was Stefansson's oceanographer. Among the younger scientists were William Laird McKinlay, a 24-year-old science teacher from Glasgow who was recommended by the British explorer William Speirs Bruce, and Bjarne Mamen, a 20-year-old skiing champion from Christiania, Norway, who was taken on as a forester, despite lacking scientific experience.

Stefansson had wanted American whaling skipper Christian Theodore Pedersen to captain Karluk, the ship designated for the Northern Party. When Pedersen withdrew, the captaincy was offered to 36-year-old Newfoundland-born Robert Bartlett, an experienced polar navigator who had commanded Robert Peary's ship, SS Roosevelt, on Peary's 1906 and 1909 polar expeditions. Bartlett did not have time, however, to select Karluk's crew, which was hurriedly assembled from around the Royal Navy Dockyard at Esquimalt in British Columbia. McKinlay later wrote of the crew that "one was a confirmed drug addict ... another suffered from venereal disease; and in spite of orders that no liquor was to be carried, at least two smuggled supplies on board". McKinlay worried that this crew might lack the qualities and character necessary in the arduous months ahead, concerns shared by Bartlett, whose first act on arrival in Esquimalt was to fire the first officer for incompetence. In his place he appointed the 22-year-old Alexander "Sandy" Anderson.

=== Ships ===
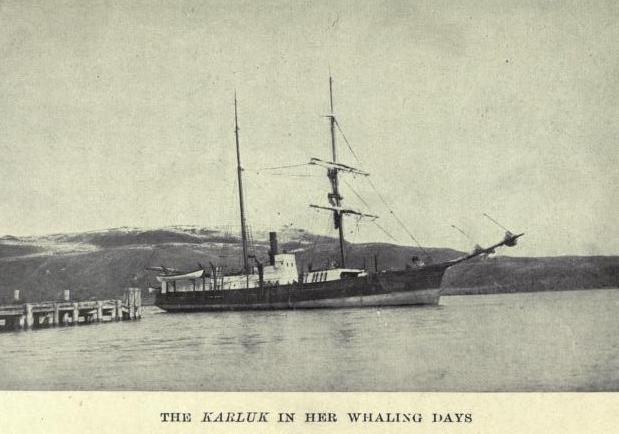
Karluk in her days as a whaling vessel

Karluk had been chosen by Pedersen and bought by Stefansson for the bargain price of US$10,000. (Note: Karluk was built in the US (Bartlett says in Oregon while US registration records show Benicia, California). She was taken over from Stefansson, when the Canadian government assumed responsibility for the expedition. Several designations have been applied to the ship, including "HMCS" (His Majesty's Canadian Ship), "DGS" (Dominion Government Ship), and "CGS" (Canadian Government Ship). HMCS is the designation for Canadian naval ships; although Karluk sailed under a non-navy captain and with a non-navy crew, she flew the Canadian Blue Ensign, the jack of the Royal Canadian Navy.) Stefansson was advised by Pedersen that, of four ships that were available, Karluk was "the soundest and best adapted for our purpose", but Bartlett had deep reservations about her fitness for prolonged Arctic service. The ship, a 29-year-old brigantine, was 129 feet (39 m) in length with a beam of 23 feet (7.0 m). She had been built for the Aleutian fishing industry (karluk is the Aleut word for "fish") and later converted for whaling, when her bows and sides had been sheathed with 2-inch (51 mm) Australian ironwood. Despite 14 arctic whaling voyages, including six overwinterings, she had not been built to withstand sustained ice pressure, and lacked the engine power to force a passage through the ice. She did not match the expectations of Bartlett, or of many of the more experienced crew.

The ship spent most of April and May 1913 undergoing repairs and refitting at the dockyard in Esquimalt. When Bartlett arrived in early June he immediately ordered further repair work. In addition to Karluk, Stefansson had purchased sight unseen a small gasoline-driven schooner, Alaska, to act as a supply ship for the Southern Party. He later added a second schooner, Mary Sachs, when the hold space in Alaska proved inadequate. In the confusion surrounding the expedition's departure, McKinlay notes, no attempt was made to align men or equipment to their appropriate ships. Thus anthropologists Henri Beuchat and Diamond Jenness, both designated for the Southern Party, found themselves sailing with Karluk, while their equipment was on board Alaska. McKinlay himself, aboard Karluk as magnetic observer, discovered that most of his equipment was with Alaska. Stefansson insisted that all would be sorted out when the ships reached their Herschel Island rendezvous. "Heaven help us all if we failed to reach Herschel Island", McKinlay wrote.

=== Towards Herschel Island ===
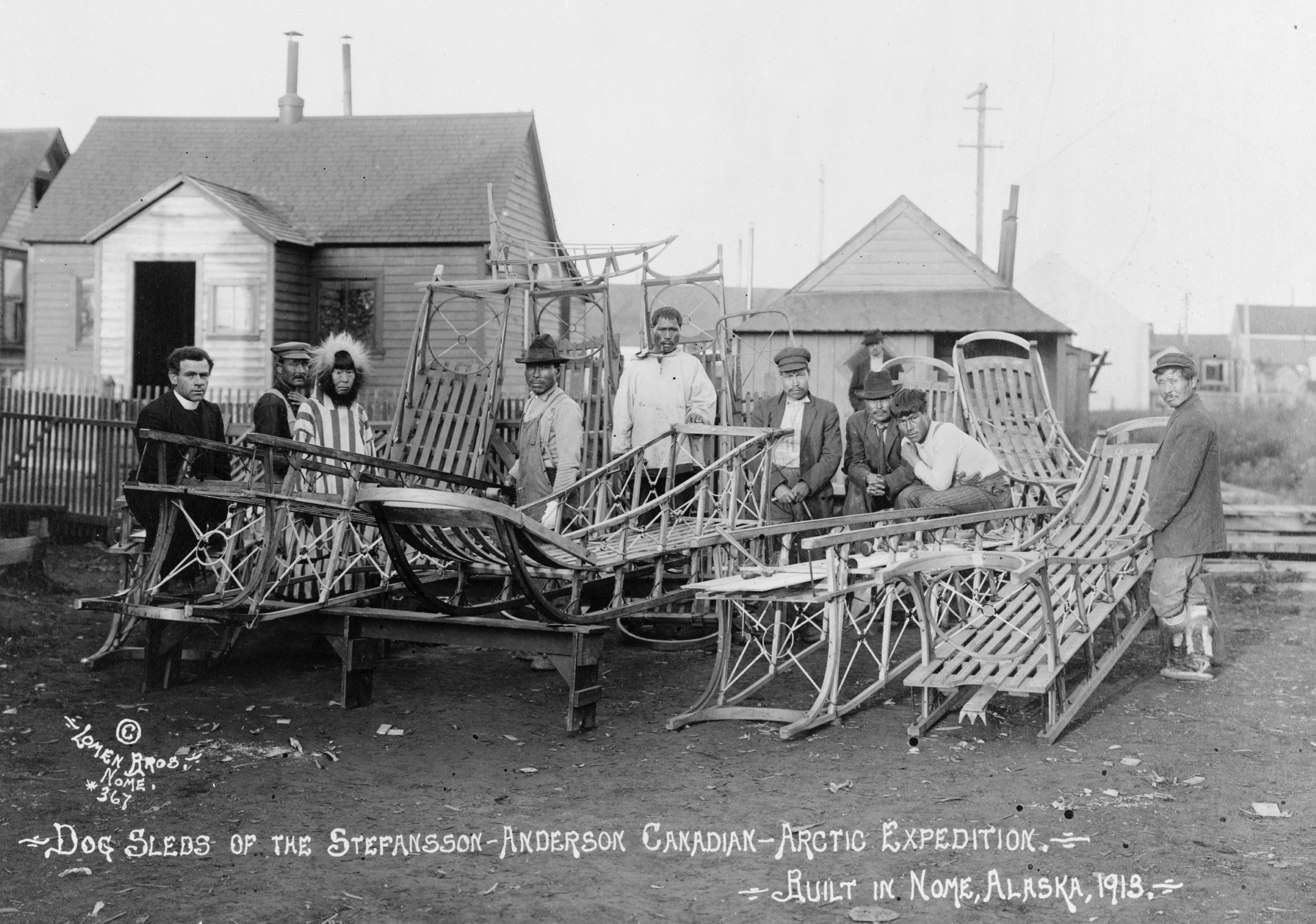
Dog sleds prepared for the expedition, Nome, 1913

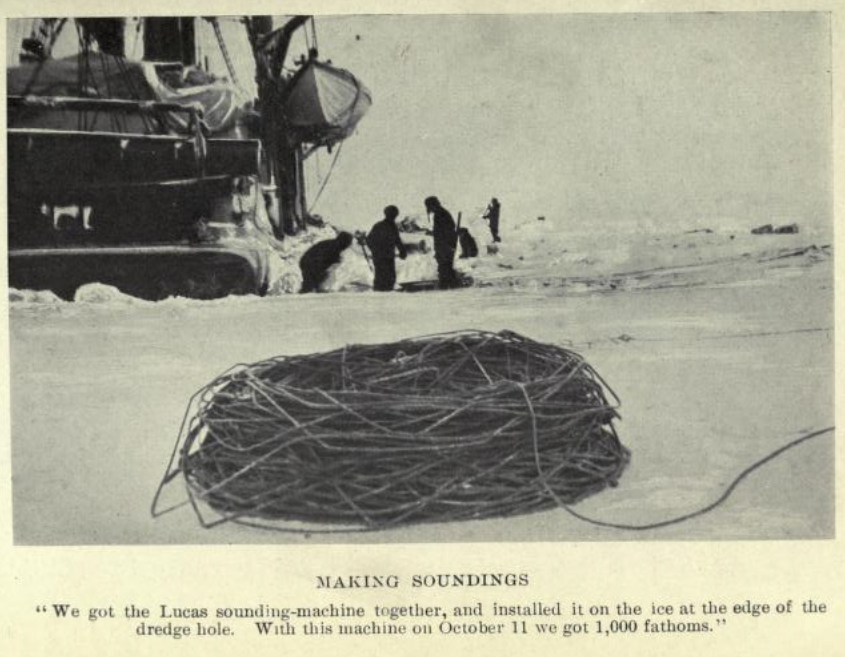
Members of Karluk's scientific staff taking depth soundings during the drift in the ice, August 1913

Karluk left Esquimalt on 17 June 1913, sailing north towards Alaska. The immediate destination was Nome, on the coast of the Bering Sea. There was trouble from the beginning with the steering gear and with the engines, both of which needed frequent attention. On 2 July Karluk reached the Bering Sea in mist, fog and rapidly falling temperatures; six days later she arrived at Nome where she joined Alaska and Mary Sachs. While the ships were being loaded in Nome, some of the scientists pressed for a meeting with the leader to clarify plans, particularly with regard to the Northern Party whose schedule was vague. The meeting was unsatisfactory. Stefansson's attitude offended several of the men, some of whom threatened to leave the expedition. They had read press reports in which Stefansson had apparently said that he expected Karluk to be crushed, and that the lives of the staff were secondary to the scientific work. Stefansson would not explain these matters, nor give further details of his plans for the Northern Party. Despite the scientists' alarm and dissatisfaction, none resigned.

At Port Clarence, just north of Nome, 28 dogs were taken on board before Karluk sailed north on 27 July. The next day she crossed the Arctic Circle, and almost immediately encountered rough weather which resulted in flooded cabins and seasickness. However, McKinlay noted that "whatever defects she had, Karluk was proving herself a fine sea-boat." On 31 July they reached Point Hope, where two Inuit hunters, known as "Jerry" and "Jimmy", joined the ship. On 1 August the permanent Arctic ice pack was seen; Bartlett made several attempts to breach the ice, but each time was forced back. On 2 August, about 25 miles (40 km) from Point Barrow, Karluk thrust her way into the ice but was soon trapped, and drifted slowly eastward for three days before reaching open water off Cape Smythe. Meanwhile, Stefansson had left to travel over the ice to Point Barrow. He rejoined the ship at Cape Smythe on 6 August, bringing with him Jack Hadley, a veteran trapper who required passage east. Hadley, a long-time acquaintance of Stefansson's, was entered in the ship's books as carpenter.

At Cape Smythe two more Inuit hunters, Keraluk and Kataktovik, joined the expedition, together with Keraluk's family—wife Keruk and their two young daughters Helen and Mugpi. As the voyage proceeded, Bartlett became increasingly anxious about the extent of ice in the area, and noted that the brass stemplates on the ship's bow had already been damaged. Over the next few days Karluk struggled to make headway, as Bartlett took the ship northwards away from the coast, following channels of open water. The only scientific tasks of substance that could be carried out during this period were Murray's dredging operations, through which he collected many species of Arctic sea life, and the regular depth soundings. On 13 August Bartlett calculated their position as 235 miles (378 km) east of Point Barrow, with a similar distance to travel to Herschel Island. This proved to be the ship's farthest point east, as at that position she became firmly trapped in the ice and began to move slowly westward; by 10 September Karluk had retreated nearly 100 miles (160 km) back towards Point Barrow. Shortly afterwards, Stefansson informed Bartlett that all hopes for further progress that year had ended, and that Karluk would have to winter in the ice.

== In the ice ==
=== Drifting west ===
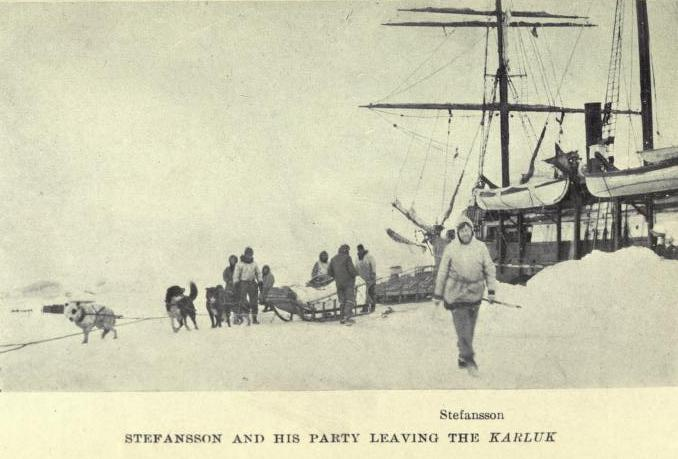
Stefansson (foreground) and his party on their departure from Karluk, 20 September 1913

On 19 September, with Karluk ice-bound and largely stationary, Stefansson announced that in view of the shortage of fresh meat and the likelihood of a long sojourn in the ice, he would lead a small hunting party that would search for caribou and other game in the area of the Colville River. He would take with him the two Inuit "Jimmy" and "Jerry", the expedition secretary Burt McConnell, the photographer George Wilkins, and the anthropologist Diamond Jenness. Stefansson expected to be gone for about ten days; Bartlett was instructed by letter that, if the ship should move from its present position, he should "send a party ashore, to erect one or more beacons giving information of the ship's whereabouts." The next day the six men departed. On 23 September, following a blizzard, the ice floe in which Karluk was trapped began to move, and soon the ship was travelling at between 30 and 60 miles (48 and 97 km) a day—but to the west, steadily further from Herschel Island and from Stefansson's party who, it soon became clear, would not be able to find their way back to the ship.

In an unpublished journal and later correspondence, McKinlay suggested that Stefansson's departure amounted to abandoning the ship to its fate. The expedition's historian S.E. Jenness (son of Diamond Jenness) rejects this view, pointing out that Stefansson and the hunting party members had left valuable property aboard Karluk; a possible motive for the trip, Jenness surmises, was to train the younger staff. The anthropologist Gísli Pálsson, writing of the expedition, asserts that while the anger of Bartlett and the crew is understandable, there is no evidence that Stefansson deliberately abandoned the men. It is arguable, Pálsson says, that Stefansson acted responsibly in attempting to secure a supply of fresh meat which would counter the possibility of scurvy, should Karluk be trapped in the ice for a long time. The historian Richard Diubaldo writes "The evidence suggests that this was a normal hunting trip" and "... there is strong evidence to suggest he [Stefansson] wished he had never left [the ship]".

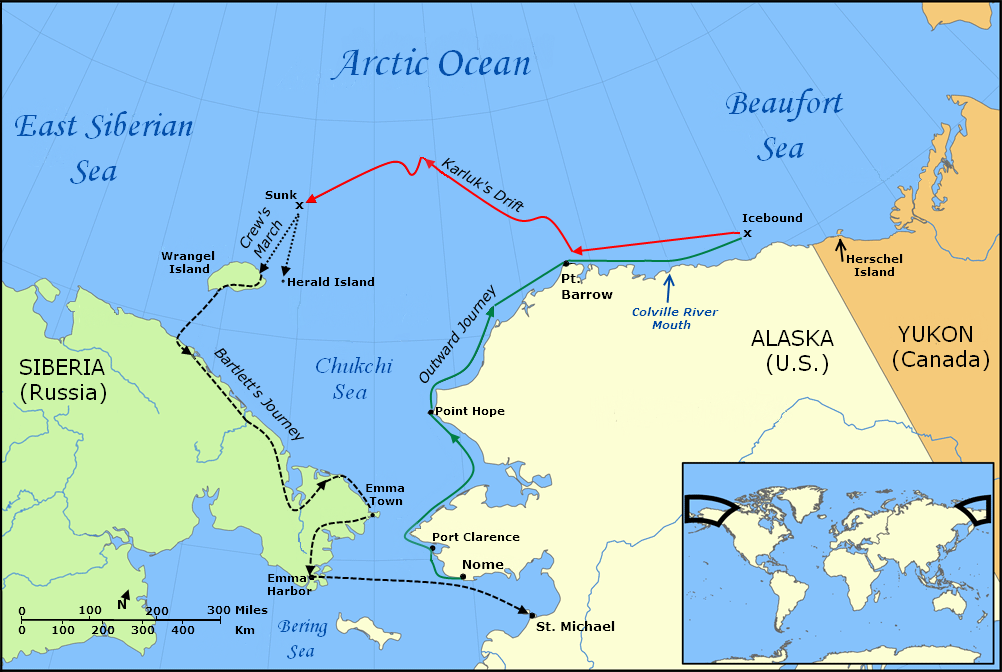
Karluk's voyage towards Herschel Island Karluk's drift in the ice floe Crew's ice marches Bartlett's rescue journey

The constant snow and thick mists made it difficult for Bartlett to calculate the Karluk's position accurately, although during a brief break in the weather on 30 September they glimpsed land which they took to be Cooper Island, in the vicinity of Point Barrow where they had been at the start of August. On 3 October the anxiety of crew and staff increased when, with Point Barrow just 5 miles (8 km) distant, the drift turned northwards, away from the land. There were fears among some that Karluk would repeat the experience of the Jeannette, an American vessel that 30 years previously had drifted in the Arctic ice for months before sinking, with the subsequent loss of most of her crew. Bartlett became aware that Murray and McKay, the two veterans of Shackleton's Nimrod expedition, were openly contemptuous of their captain's leadership. They were making plans to leave the ship at an appropriate time, and head for land on their own.

As the weather grew worse Bartlett ordered supplies and equipment to be transferred onto the ice, both to lighten the ship and as a precaution should it be necessary to abandon the vessel in a hurry. Food supplies were augmented by seal hunts—two or three seals a day was the average bag, according to McKinlay—and by a single polar bear that had wandered near the ship in mid-November. On 15 November Karluk reached 73°N, the most northerly point of its drift, and then began moving south-west, in the general direction of the Siberian coast. By mid-December the estimated position was 140 miles (230 km) from Wrangel Island. Despite the bleak outlook—Bartlett was privately convinced that Karluk would not survive the winter— a determined effort was made to celebrate Christmas, with decorations, presents, a programme of sports on the ice, and a banquet. By then they were just 50 miles (80 km) north of Herald Island, a rocky outpost east of Wrangel Island; on 29 December land was visible in the distance, though whether this was Herald Island or Wrangel Island was not clear. The sighting of land briefly raised morale, but in the New Year the ice began breaking up and forming pressure ridges. Over the next few days, wrote McKinlay, "the twanging, drumming, ominous ice sounds got louder and nearer."

=== Sinking ===
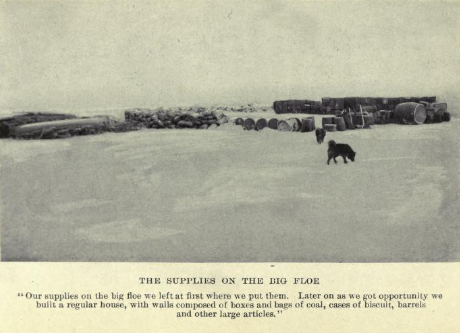
Supplies taken off the Karluk and placed on the ice at Shipwreck Camp

Early in the morning of 10 January 1914, McKinlay records, "a severe shudder shook the whole ship" as the ice attacked the hull. Bartlett, still hoping to save his ship, gave orders to lighten her by removing all accumulated snow from the decks. He also ordered all hands to have warm clothing ready. At 6.45 in the evening a loud bang indicated that the hull had been punctured; Bartlett went immediately to the engine room and observed water pouring in through a gash 10 feet (3.0 m) long. There was no possibility that the pumps could deal with the inflow, and the captain gave the order to abandon ship. Weather conditions, says McKinlay, could hardly have been worse, but the crew and staff worked throughout the night, in pitch darkness and driving snow, to add to the quantities of rations and equipment already stored on the ice. Bartlett remained on board until the last moments, playing loud music on the ship's Victrola and burning each record upon finishing it. At 3:15 p.m. on 11 January, Bartlett put on Chopin's Funeral March as a final salute to the ship, and stepped off. Karluk sank within minutes, her yardarms snapping off as she disappeared through the narrow hole in the ice. McKinlay took stock of the stranded party: 22 men, one woman, two children, 16 dogs and a cat. (Note: The cat, named by the crew Nigeraurak ("Little Black One"), had come on board at Esquimault, and had been adopted by fireman Fred Maurer. After the sinking she survived the ice marches and the period on Wrangel Island, and was rescued with the survivors in September 1914. According to Niven's account the cat lived to a grand old age, producing numerous litters.)

=== Shipwreck Camp ===
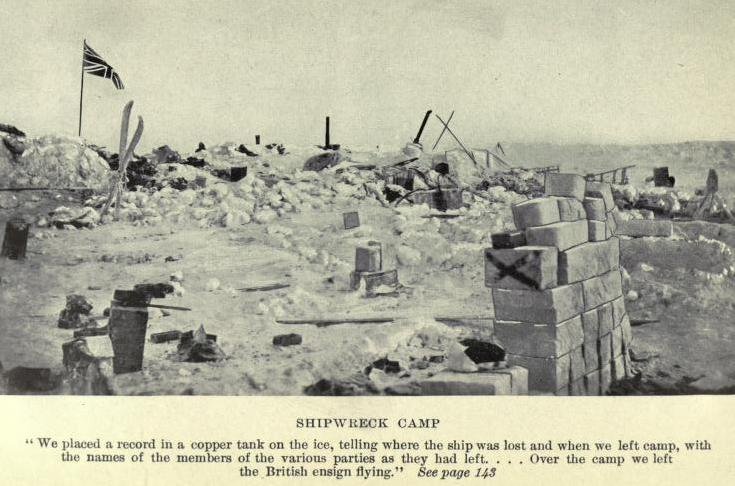
Shipwreck camp, established on the ice after Karluk's sinking

Bartlett's decision to deposit stores on the ice ensured that an ice camp, known as "Shipwreck Camp", was more or less established by the time Karluk sank. Two shelters had been built, one a snow igloo with a canvas roof, the other constructed from packing cases. To the latter was added a kitchen with a large stove rescued from Karluk's engine room. A small, separate shelter was built for the five Inuit, and a rough perimeter created from coal bags and assorted containers. In McKinlay's words, the camp provided "substantial and comfortable houses on which we could rely for shelter for a long time." Stores were plentiful, and the party was able to eat well. Much of the time in the first days of the camp was spent preparing and adjusting clothing and sleeping gear, in readiness for the forthcoming march to Wrangel Island. The ice drift was slowly moving the camp in the direction of the island, but as yet there was insufficient daylight to attempt the march.

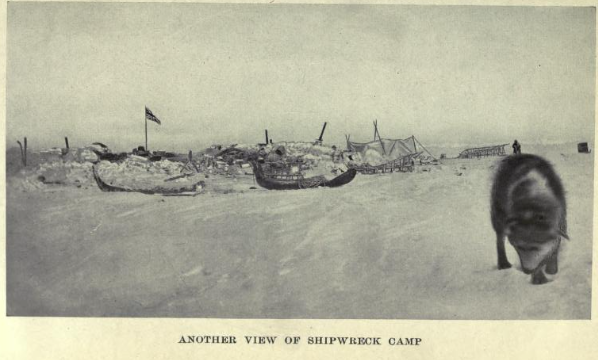
"Another view of Shipwreck Camp"

Amid this activity Mackay and Murray, now joined by the anthropologist Henri Beuchat, played little part in the general life of the camp and expressed their determination to leave it, independently, as soon as possible. Bartlett wanted to wait for the longer daylight hours of February before attempting the march, but was persuaded by McKinlay and Mamen to send a trailbreaking group to set up an advance camp on Wrangel Island. A party of four, led by Karluk's first officer Alexander Anderson and including crew members Charles Barker, John Brady and Edmund Golightly, left Shipwreck Camp on 21 January with instructions from Bartlett to establish their camp at or near Berry Point on the north shore of Wrangel Island. On 4 February Bjarne Mamen, who accompanied the party as a scout, returned to Shipwreck Camp and reported that he had left the group a few miles short of land that was evidently not Wrangel Island, and was probably Herald Island, 38 miles (61 km) from their intended destination. This was the last sighting of Anderson's party; their ultimate fate was not established until ten years later, when their remains were found on Herald Island.

=== March to Wrangel Island ===
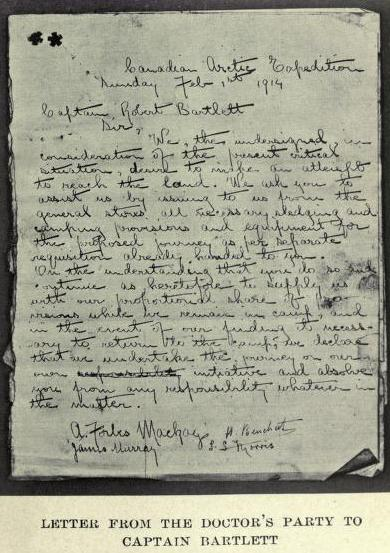
Letter to Captain Bartlett signed by Alistair Forbes Mackay and his party, informing the captain of their decision to march for land independently

Bartlett decided to send a team back to establish the exact location of the island that the Anderson party had approached, and to determine if Anderson had actually landed there. An injury to his knee ruled Mamen out from this mission, which was undertaken by ship's steward Ernest Chafe, with the Inuit pair, Kataktovik and Kuraluk. Chafe's group came within 2 miles (3 km) of Herald Island before being stopped by open water. A careful examination through binoculars revealed no signs of the missing party, and Chafe concluded that Anderson and company had not reached the island. Chafe and his party then returned to Shipwreck Camp.

Meanwhile, on 4 February, Mackay and his group (Murray and Beuchat, joined by seaman Stanley Morris) announced they were leaving the next day, to seek land. Mackay presented Bartlett with a letter dated 1 February that began: "We, the undersigned, in consideration of the present critical situation, desire to make an attempt to reach the land." The letter requested appropriate supplies, and concluded by emphasising that the journey was on their own initiative and absolving Bartlett from all responsibilities. Bartlett allocated them a sledge, a tent, six gallons of oil, a rifle and ammunition and food for 50 days. They left on 5 February; the last sighting of them was a few days later, by Chafe and the Inuit, returning from their abortive trip to Herald Island. They found Mackay's party struggling to make headway, with some of their provisions lost and clothing and other equipment discarded to lighten their load. Beuchat in particular was in a distressed state, nearly delirious and in the throes of hypothermia. However, the party refused assistance and rejected Chafe's pleas that they return with him to Shipwreck Camp. Thereafter the only hint of their fate was a sailor's scarf belonging to Morris, later found buried in an ice floe. It was assumed that the four had either been crushed by the ice or fallen through it.

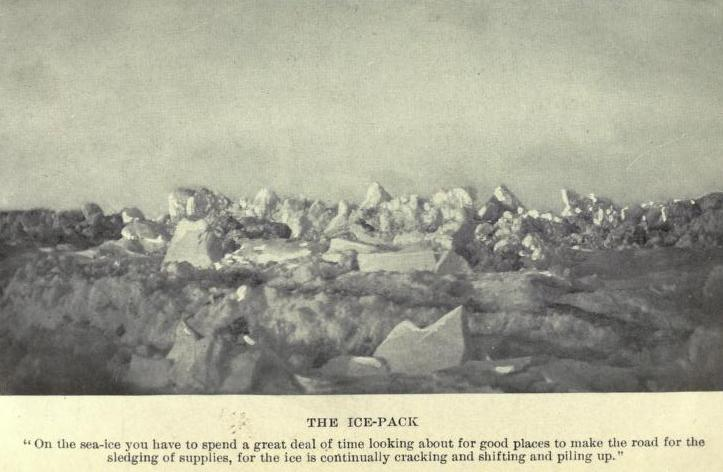
The frozen, disturbed surface of the sea around Wrangel Island

Bartlett's party now consisted of eight Karluk crew members (himself, engineers John Munro and Robert Williamson, seamen Hugh Williams and Fred Maurer, fireman George Breddy, cook Robert Templeman, and Chafe), three scientists (McKinlay, Mamen and geologist George Malloch), John Hadley, and five Inuit (the family of four and Kataktovik). Hadley, nearing 60 years of age, was one of the few, along with Bartlett and the Inuit, with experience of travelling for distances over ice. Bartlett sent his forces out, in groups, to blaze a trail and lay down supply depots on the route to Wrangel Island, thus preparing his inexperienced party for the hazards of ice travel. When he felt they were ready for the main journey he divided them into four teams and sent the first two away on 19 February. Bartlett himself led the last two groups from the camp on 24 February, leaving a note of the party's location in a copper drum in case the camp should drift into an inhabited area. The distance to Wrangel Island was estimated at 40 miles (64 km), but the journey proved to be twice that in length.

The ice surface was very broken up, making travel slow and difficult. At first the parties were able to travel along a track that had been marked out by the advance parties. However, recent storms had destroyed much of the trail, and in places progress was held up by breaking ice which at one point almost wrecked Bartlett's camp as his team slept. On 28 February all the parties came together in front of the first of a series of high ridges, from 25 to 100 feet (7.6 to 30.5 m) in height, that halted their progress. These stretched east and west, blocking any route to the island. McKinlay, Hadley and Chafe were sent on a risky journey back to Shipwreck Camp to pick up supplies that had been left there, while the rest slowly chopped and cut a pathway through the towering ridges. When McKinlay's group returned to the main party a week later, the path forward had been advanced by only three miles (5 km), but the worst of the ridges had been overcome. Hadley claimed that the ridges were worse than anything he had seen in his long years of Arctic experience. The later stages of the journey were easier, as the group travelled over steadily smoother ice, and on 12 March they reached land, a long spit of sand stretching out from the northern shores of Wrangel Island.

== Bartlett's journey ==
Bartlett's initial plan had been for the group to rest briefly on Wrangel Island and then to move on together to the Siberian coast. However, because three men—Mamen, Malloch and Maurer—were injured, and others were weak and frostbitten, Bartlett decided that the main party should remain on the island while he went for help taking only Kataktovik. The pair started off on 18 March, with seven dogs and provisions for 48 days (30 days for the dogs), and took an extended route round the island's southern shores to look for signs of Anderson's or Mackay's parties. After finding nothing, they headed across the ice towards Siberia, but progress was slow over a surface that was frequently shifting and breaking up to form leads of open water. More time was lost digging out their provisions from the steadily drifting snow. As they drew nearer to the mainland, Kataktovik became nervous; he had heard that the Alaskan Inuit were disliked in Siberia by the native Chukchi people, and feared for his life. Bartlett did his best to reassure him as they moved slowly forward.

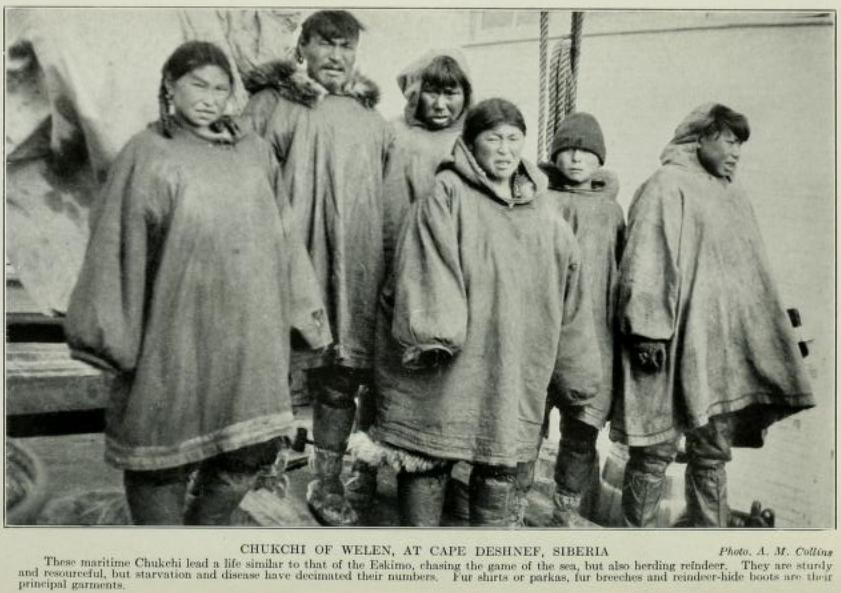
A group of North Siberian Chukchi, photographed in 1913

On 4 April the pair reached land near Cape Jakan, west of Cape North on the northern Siberian coast. The presence of sledge marks in the snow showed they had landed in an inhabited area. They followed these tracks for a day, before arriving at a small Chukchi village. Here, contrary to Kataktovik's fears, they were received hospitably, and given shelter and food. On 7 April they set out for East Cape. Bartlett had not previously experienced such relentlessly cold weather, with blizzards, hurricane-force winds, and temperatures often below −50 °C (−58 °F). On the way they passed through several Chukchi villages, where Bartlett traded goods for necessary supplies—he exchanged his Colt revolver for a young, strong dog. Bartlett was touched by the kindness and generosity shown by many of those they encountered on the way, "typical of the true humanity of these kindly people". On 24 April they arrived at Emma Town, a settlement a few miles west of East Cape. Bartlett calculated that in the 37 days since leaving Wrangel Island, he and Kataktovik had travelled about 700 miles (1,100 km), all but the last stage on foot.

At Emma Town Bartlett met Baron Kleist, a distinguished Russian official who offered to take him to Emma Harbour on the coast, a week's journey away, where he could look for a ship to Alaska. Bartlett accepted, and on 10 May, though still weak from his journey and an attack of tonsillitis, said goodbye to Kataktovik (who was remaining for the time being in Emma Town), and set off with the baron. On the way they learned that Captain Pedersen was in the area. On 16 May they reached Emma Harbour; five days later Pedersen arrived in the whaler Herman and, without delay, took Bartlett on board and set out for Alaska. They arrived off Nome on 24 May, but ice prevented them reaching the shore. After three days' waiting they turned south, and landed at St Michael, where Bartlett was at last able to send a radio message to Ottawa informing the government of Karluk's fate. He also made enquiries about the whereabouts of the United States revenue cutter Bear, which he saw as a possible rescue vessel for the stranded party.

== On Wrangel Island ==
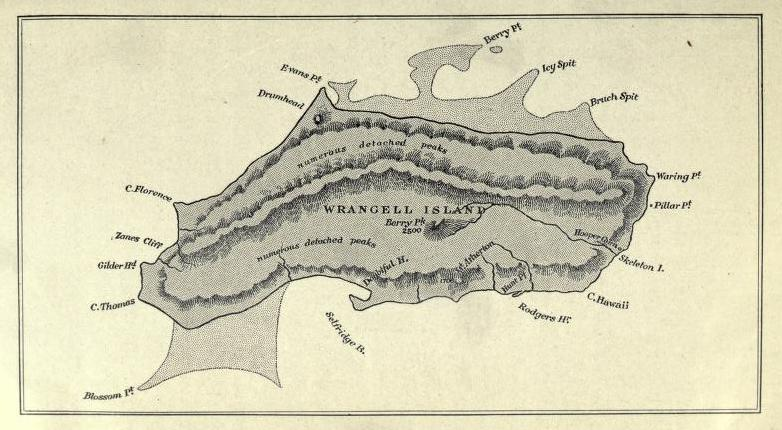
Tracing of a map of Wrangel Island drawn by Bjarne Mamen. The locations of party's various camping grounds (Icy Spit, Waring Pt., Rodgers Harbor) are indicated.

The landfall from Shipwreck Camp had been on the north side of Wrangel Island, at a spot which they named "Icy Spit". Before his departure, Bartlett asked the party to set up several camps around the island, which would increase the hunting areas. The captain also felt that separation into smaller groups would assist general harmony by keeping incompatible characters apart. He wanted all groups to reassemble at Rodgers Harbor, on the south side of the island, about the middle of July.

However, dissension broke out almost immediately after Bartlett's departure over the sharing of food. It had not been possible to drag all the supplies from Shipwreck Camp, and the trek had taken longer than expected; consequently there were shortages of biscuit, pemmican (a compound of dried meat, fat and sugar) and dog food. There was little prospect of augmenting supplies by hunting birds and game until the weather improved in May or June. When Hadley and the Inuk, Kuraluk, returned from a seal hunt on the ice, Hadley was widely suspected of concealing the proceeds of the hunt for his own consumption; the same pair were also accused of wasting scarce cooking oil. McKinlay records that the circumstances depressed morale and destroyed comradeship: "The misery and desperation of our situation multiplied every weakness, every quirk of personality, every flaw in character, a thousandfold."

Two attempts were made to travel back to Shipwreck Camp to pick up extra food, but both failed, the second resulting in further losses of dogs and equipment. Chafe, whose feet had become gangrenous after severe frostbite, had his toes removed by second engineer Williamson, with improvised tools. McKinlay and Munro risked their lives by travelling over the sea ice towards Herald Island, in a final effort to locate either of the missing parties. They could get no nearer than 15 miles (24 km), and from an examination of the distant island through binoculars could see no indications of life.

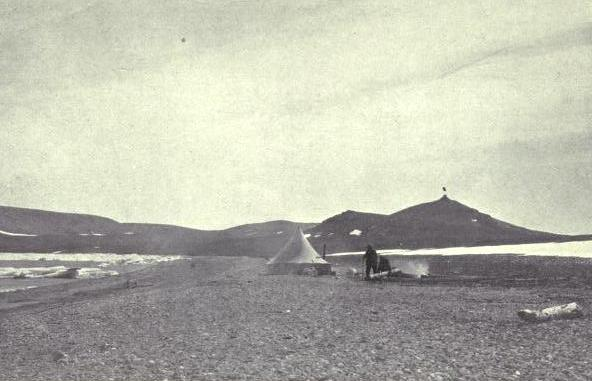
The camp at Rodgers Harbor. Wrangel Island

Other health problems persisted; Malloch's frostbitten feet failed to heal, and Mamen's knee, which he had dislocated during the days at Shipwreck Camp, troubled him continuously. A worrying illness began to affect many of the party: the general symptoms were swelling of the legs, ankles and other body parts, accompanied by acute lethargy. Malloch was the worst affected; he died on 17 May, but his tent-mate Mamen was too ill to see to his burial, so the body lay in the tent for several days, creating a "frightful smell", until McKinlay arrived to help. Mamen himself died ten days later of the same debilitating disease.

From early June the diet was augmented with the appearance of birds. These birds and their eggs became a vital source of food; as the supply of seal meat dwindled to nothing, the party was reduced to eating rotten flippers, hide, or any part of a seal that was remotely edible. The sharing of birds became another bone of contention; according to Williamson "Wednesday last, [Breddy and Chafe] really obtained 6 eggs and 5 birds instead of 2 eggs and 4 birds as they reported." Breddy was suspected of other thefts. On 25 June, after a gunshot was heard, Breddy was found dead in his tent. The circumstances of his death, whether accident, suicide or in Hadley's view, murder (with Williamson as the chief suspect) could not be determined. Williamson later called Hadley's suspicions "hallucinations and absolutely untrue." Various items stolen from McKinlay were found among Breddy's personal effects.

Despite the sombre outlook, the Canadian flag was raised at Rodgers Harbor on 1 July in honour of Dominion Day. Later in the month the party's spirits improved when Kuraluk caught a 600-pound (270 kg) walrus, which provided fresh meat for several days. As August came without sign of a ship and the weather began to turn wintry again, hopes of rescue fell; the party began to prepare for another winter.

== Rescue ==
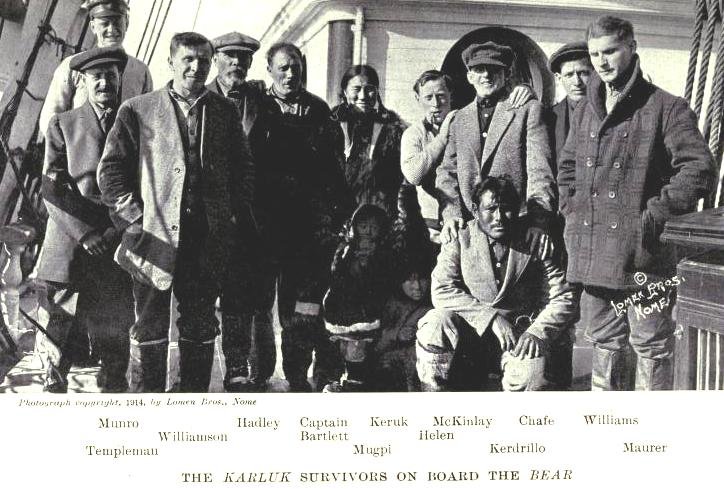
The Karluk survivors after rescue, photographed with Captain Bartlett on board the rescue vessel Bear Left to right: Munro {back row}; Templeman {front row}; Williamson; Hadley; Captain Bartlett; Keruk {back row}; Mugpi {front row}; Helen {front row}; McKinlay {back row}; Kerdrillo {front row}; Chafe {back row}; Williams {back row}; Maurer{front row}

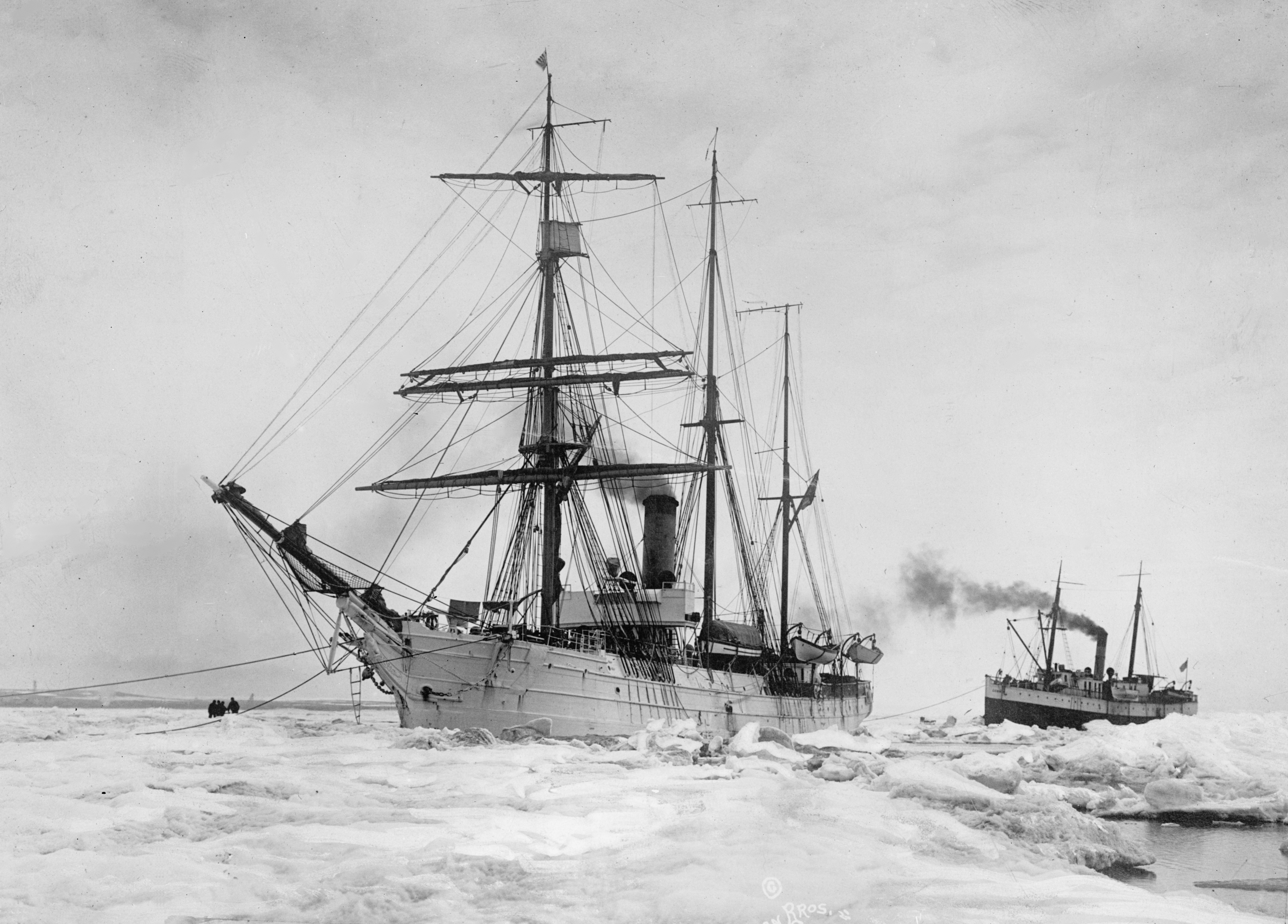
Bear and Corwin, June 1914

The revenue cutter Bear arrived in St Michael, Alaska, midway through June. Her master, Captain Cochran, agreed to go to Wrangel Island as soon as he got permission from the United States government. It would be impossible, in any event, to attempt the rescue before mid-July; ice conditions in the Arctic that year were reported as severe. After receiving permission, Bear, with Bartlett aboard, left St Michael on 13 July; the ship had many calls to make along the Alaskan coast before she could proceed with the rescue. On 5 August, at Port Hope, Bartlett met with Kataktovik and gave him his expedition wages and a new suit of clothing. At Point Barrow on 21 August Bartlett encountered Burt McConnell, Stefansson's erstwhile secretary, who gave details of Stefansson's movements after leaving Karluk the previous September. In April 1914, McConnell reported, Stefansson had headed north with two companions, searching for new lands.

McConnell left Point Barrow for Nome aboard King and Winge, an American-registered walrus hunter, while Bear finally sailed for Wrangel Island. On 25 August Bear was stopped by ice 20 miles (32 km) from the island, and after failing to force a way through, Cochran had to return to Nome for more coal—a decision which, says Bartlett, gave him "days to try a man's soul". Back in Nome Bartlett met Olaf Swenson, who had chartered King and Winge for the season and was about to sail for Siberia. Bartlett requested that, if possible, King and Winge stop by Wrangel Island and look for the stranded Karluk party. Bear left Nome on 4 September, a few days after Swenson's ship. King and Winge, with McConnell still aboard, reached Wrangel Island on 7 September. That morning the group at Rodgers Harbor were awakened early in the morning by the sound of a ship's whistle, and found King and Winge lying a quarter of a mile offshore. They were rapidly transferred to the ship, which then picked up the remainder of the stranded party who were camped along the coast at Waring Point. By the afternoon all 14 survivors were aboard.

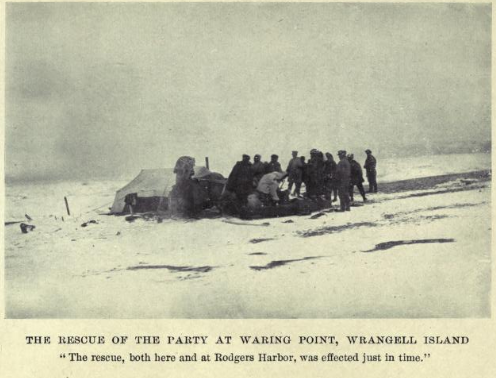
Karluk survivors camped at Waring Point, Wrangel Island are rescued.

After a futile attempt to approach Herald Island, the ship began the journey back to Alaska; next day she encountered Bear, with Bartlett aboard. McConnell records that the party were unanimous in their desire to remain with the ship that had effected their rescue, but Bartlett ordered them aboard Bear. Before returning to Alaska, Bear made a final attempt to reach Herald Island; ice limited their approach to 12 miles (19 km), and they saw no signs of life. (Note: The steamer Corwin, chartered for a rescue attempt by Jafet Lindeberg of Nome, and the Russian icebreaker Vaygach also approached Herald Island without seeing any trace of the missing men.) The reunited party arrived at Nome on 13 September, to a great welcome from the local population.

== Aftermath ==
Bartlett, celebrated as a hero by press and public, was honoured for "outstanding bravery" by the Royal Geographical Society. However, he was later censured by an admiralty commission for taking Karluk into the ice, and for allowing Mackay's party to leave the main group—despite the letter that Mackay and the others had signed, absolving the captain from responsibility. Stefansson, too, was privately critical of Bartlett's conduct. Bartlett resumed his career at sea, and over the next 30 years led many more excursions to the Arctic. During the Second World War he carried out surveying and supply work for the Allies; he died, aged 70, in April 1946. His account of the Karluk disaster, published in 1916, makes no direct criticism of Stefansson or anyone else; Niven records, however, that to his friends Bartlett was highly uncomplimentary about his former leader.

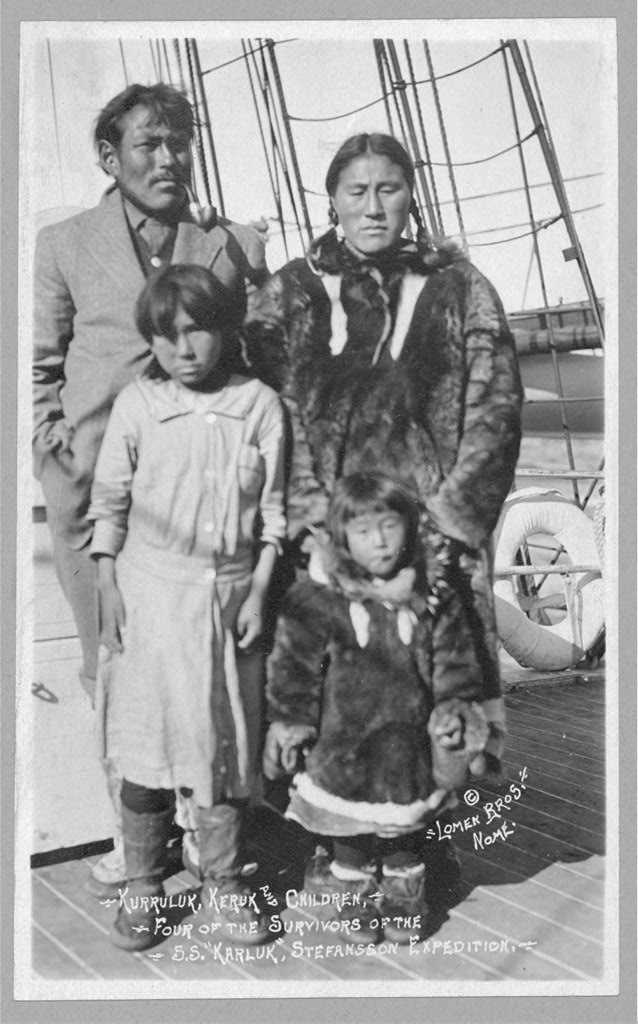
Kurruluk, Keruk and children, four of the survivors of the S.S. "Karluk" Stefansson's Canadian Arctic Expedition

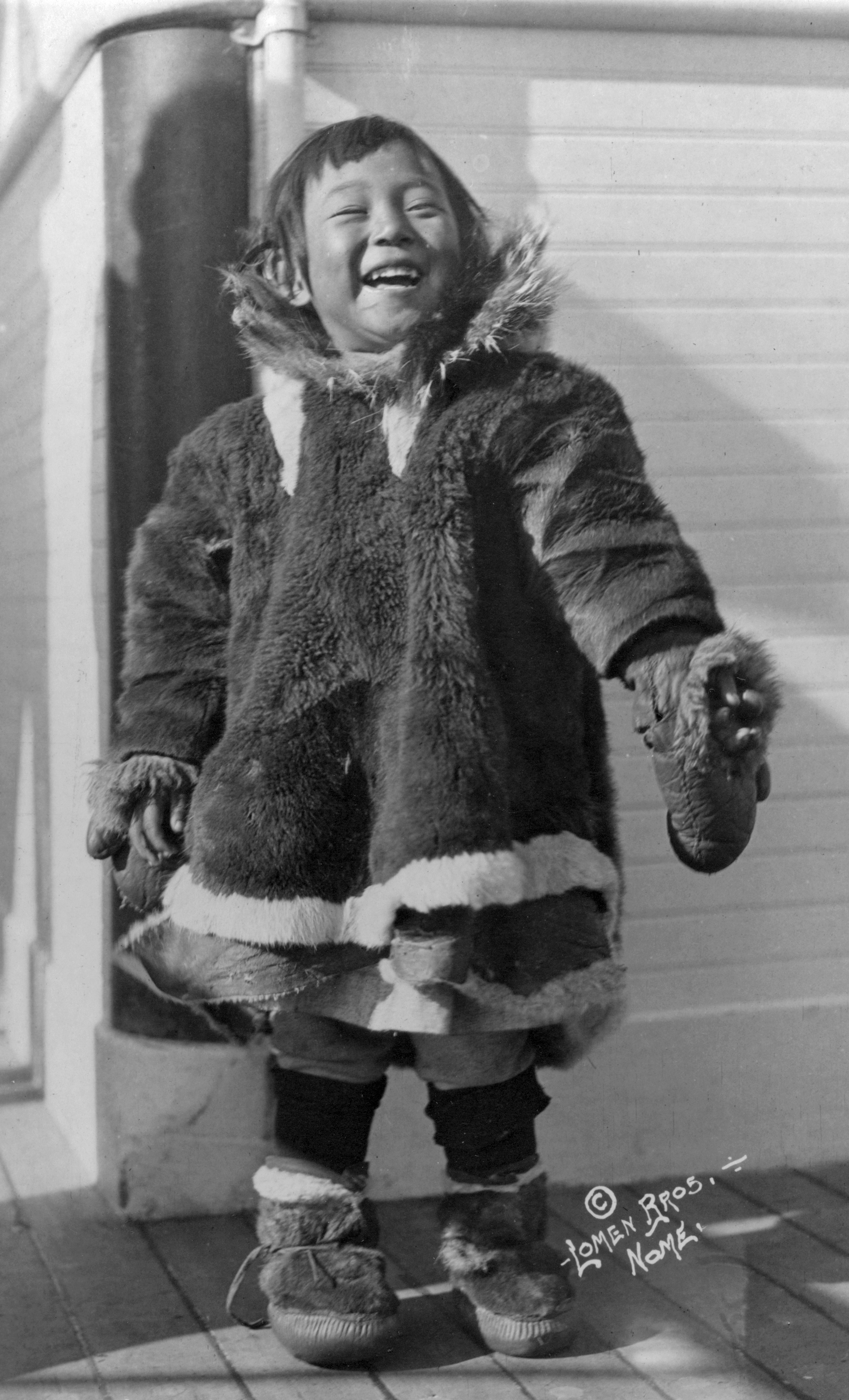
"Mugpi", the three-year-old child who with her family survived the ordeal of the Karluk voyage.

In 1918 Stefansson returned after four years' absence, reporting the discovery of three new islands. He was honoured by the National Geographical Society, received tributes from polar veterans such as Peary and Adolphus Greely, and was given the presidency of the Explorers Club of New York. In Canada his reception was more muted; there were questions relating to the overall costs of the expedition, its poor initial organisation, and his handling of the Southern Party which, under Rudolph Anderson, completed its work independently of Stefansson. Anderson and other members of the Southern Party later petitioned the Canadian government to investigate statements made by Stefansson in his 1921 book The Friendly Arctic, which they felt reflected poorly on their honour. The request was declined on the ground that "no good could come of the enquiry." In his book Stefansson takes responsibility for the "bold" decision to take Karluk into the ice rather than hugging the coast on the way to Herschel Island, and accepts that he "chose the wrong alternative". However, McKinlay felt that the book gave an inaccurate account of the Karluk voyage and its consequences, "putting the blame ... on everyone but Vilhjalmur Stefansson." The historian Tom Henighan believes that McKinlay's biggest complaint against his leader was that "Stefansson never at any time seemed able to express an appropriate sorrow over his lost men." Stefansson, who never returned to the Arctic, died in 1962 at the age of 82.

The fate of First Officer Alexander Anderson's party remained unknown until 1924, when an American vessel landed at Herald Island and found human remains, with supplies of food, clothing, ammunition and equipment. From these artefacts it was established that this was Anderson's party. No cause of death was established, though the plentiful unconsumed supplies ruled out starvation. One theory was that the tent had blown away in a storm and that the party had frozen to death. Another was carbon monoxide poisoning within the tent.

The mystery illness which affected most of the Wrangel Island party and accelerated the deaths of Malloch and Mamen was later diagnosed as a form of nephritis brought about by eating faulty pemmican. Stefansson explained this by saying that "our pemmican makers has failed us through supplying us with a product deficient in fat." Peary had emphasised that a polar explorer should "give his personal, constant and insistent attention" to the making of his pemmican; McKinlay believed that Stefansson had devoted too much time selling the idea of the expedition, and too little ensuring the quality of the food that its members would depend upon.

Of the survivors, Hadley continued working for the Canadian Arctic Expedition, becoming second officer and later master of the supply ship Polar Bear. He died of influenza, in San Francisco in 1918. Hadley and McConnell wrote accounts of their experiences for Stefansson, who incorporated them in The Friendly Arctic. Chafe also wrote and published a short account. Most of the others quickly returned to relative obscurity, but in 1922, Fred Maurer was persuaded by Stefansson to join an attempt to colonise Wrangel Island. To the embarrassment of the Canadian government, Stefansson insisted on going ahead, even though Wrangel Island was indisputably part of what had then become the Soviet Union. A party of five, including Maurer, was sent to the island; only one, an Inuk woman Ada Blackjack, survived. Despite their ordeal, many of the Karluk survivors lived long lives; Williamson, who declined to speak or write of his experiences in the Arctic, lived to be 97, dying in Victoria, Canada, in 1975. McKinlay died in 1983, aged 95, having published his account of the expedition in 1976. Kuraluk, Kuruk and their daughters, Helen and Mugpi, returned to their former life at Point Barrow. The two girls, says Pálsson, had provided "important sources of cheer at the darkest moments." Mugpi, who later was known as Ruth Makpii Ipalook, became the very last survivor of the Karluk voyage, dying in 2008 at the age of 97.

== Published voyage accounts ==
Six first-hand accounts of Karluk's last voyage have been published. These include Stefansson's account which only covers the June to September 1913 period. Expedition secretary Burt McConnell wrote an account of the Wrangel Island rescue which was published in The New York Times, 15 September 1914. A version of McConnell's account appears in Stefansson's book.

- 1914: Bartlett's story of the Karluk – Robert Bartlett
- 1916: The Last Voyage of the Karluk – Robert Bartlett and Ralph Hale
- 1918: The Voyage of the Karluk, and its Tragic Ending – Ernest Chafe
- 1921: The Friendly Arctic – Vilhjalmur Stefansson
- 1921: The Story of the Karluk – John Hadley
- 1976: Karluk: The great untold story of Arctic exploration – William Laird McKinlay
- 2001: The Ice Master: The Doomed 1913 Voyage of the Karluk - Jennifer Niven
- 2022: Empire of Ice and Stone: The Disastrous and Heroic Voyage of the Karluk – Buddy Levy

== Sources ==
- "American Offshore Whaling Voyages: a database". Mystic Seaport (Lund, Judith N., Elizabeth A. Josephson, Randall R. Reeves and Tim D. Smith; National Maritime Digital Library). November 2, 2016. (search ship "Karluk")
- Annual List of Merchant Vessels of the United States (1913). Washington DC: US Department of the Treasury. 1913. (search "Karluk")
- Bartlett, Robert; Ralph Hale (1916). The Last Voyage of the Karluk. Toronto: McLelland, Goodchild and Stewart.
- Chafe, Ernest F. (May 1918). "The Voyage of the "Karluk," and Its Tragic Ending". The Geographical Journal. 51 (5): 307–316. Bibcode:1918GeogJ..51..307C. doi:10.2307/1780073. JSTOR 1780073. (subscription required)
- Cochran, C.S. (1915). Report of northern cruise, Coast Guard cutter Bear. Annual report of the United States Coast Guard. Washington: Government Printing Office. pp. 79–86.
- Diubaldo, Richard J (1998). Stefansson and the Canadian Arctic. Montreal: McGill-Queen's Press. ISBN 0-7735-1815-0.
- Fleming, Fergus (2002). Ninety Degrees North. London: Granta Books. ISBN 1-86207-535-2.
- Harper, Kenn (July 18, 2008). "Ruth Makpii Ipalook: 1911–2008". Nunatsiaq News. Archived from the original on October 8, 2011.
- Henighan, Tom (2009). Vilhjalmur Stefansson: Arctic Traveller. Toronto: Dundurn Press. ISBN 978-1-55002-874-4.
- Higgins, Jenny (2008). "The Karluk Disaster". Memorial University of Newfoundland.
- Jenness, Stuart Edward (2004). The Making of an Explorer: George Hubert Wilkins and the Canadian Arctic Expedition, 1913–1916. Montreal: McGill-Queens University Press. ISBN 0-7735-2798-2.
- Leslie, Edward E. (1988). Desperate Journeys, Abandoned Souls. New York: Houghton Mifflin. ISBN 0-395-91150-8.
- McConnell, Burt (September 15, 1914). "Got Karluk's Men As Hope Was Dim" (PDF). The New York Times.
- McKinlay, William Laird (1976). Karluk: The great untold story of Arctic exploration. London: Weidenfeld & Nicolson. ISBN 0-297-77164-7. (The book was republished in 1999 as The Last Voyage of the Karluk: A Survivor's Memoir of Arctic Disaster)
- Niven, Jennifer (2001). The Ice Master. London: Pan Books. ISBN 0-330-39123-2.
- Pálsson, Gísli; Keneva Kunz (2005). Travelling passions: the hidden life of Vilhjalmur Stefansson. Lebanon, NH: Dartmouth College Press. ISBN 978-1-58465-510-7.
- Riffenburgh, Beau (2005). Nimrod. London: Bloomsbury Publications. ISBN 0-7475-7253-4.
- Stefansson, Vilhjalmur (1921). "The Friendly Arctic". Science. 57 (1484). New York: The Macmillan Company: 665–666. doi:10.1126/science.57.1484.665-a. PMID 17781680.
- Vanstone, James W (July 1994). "The Noice Collection of Copper Inuit Material Culture". Fieldiana. Anthropology. New York: Field Museum of Natural History (Fieldiana Series, publication no. 1455): 4–5. ISSN 0071-4739.
