= Herald Island =

Herald Island may refer to:

- Herald Island (Arctic), in Russia
- Herald Island (New Zealand), in New Zealand
- Herald Island (Queensland), Australia
