= Belvidere, Wisconsin =

- Town
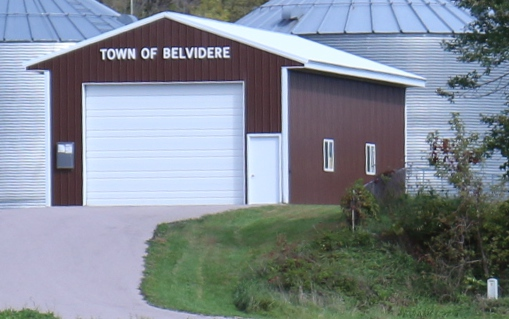
- Town hall

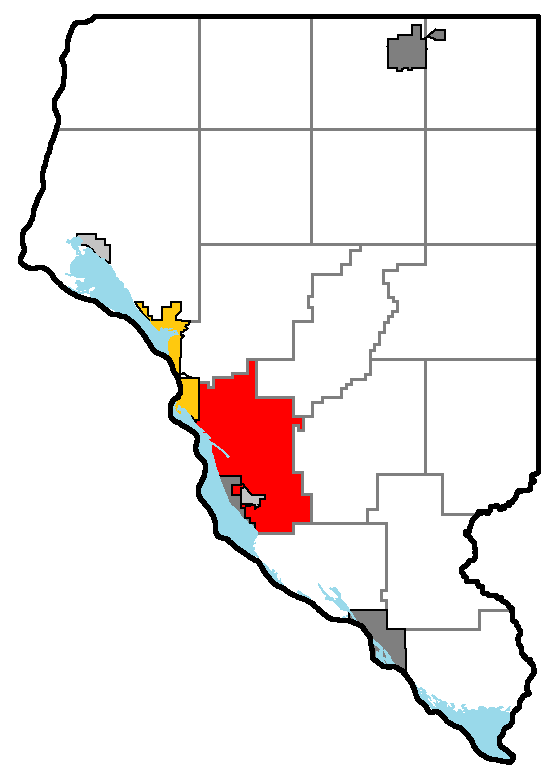
- Location of Belvidere, Buffalo County

- Location of Buffalo County, Wisconsin
- Coordinates: 44°15′1″N 91°51′17″W
- Country: United States
- State: Wisconsin
- County: Buffalo

Area
  - Total: 34.4 sq mi (89.2 km^{2})
  - Land: 32.2 sq mi (83.5 km^{2})
  - Water: 2.2 sq mi (5.6 km^{2})
- Elevation: 696 ft (212 m)

Population (2020)
  - Total: 403
  - Density: 12.5/sq mi (4.83/km^{2})
- Time zone: UTC-6 (Central (CST))
  - Summer (DST): UTC-5 (CDT)
- FIPS code: 55-06675
- GNIS feature ID: 1582793
- Website: townofbelvidere.com

Belvidere (/ˈbɛlvɪdɪər/ BEL-vid-eer) is a town in Buffalo County in the U.S. state of Wisconsin. The population was 403 at the 2020 census. The unincorporated community of Herold is located in the town.

== Geography ==
Belvidere is located in western Buffalo County, with its western boundary following the main channel of the Mississippi River and forming the state boundary with Minnesota. The city of Alma borders the northwestern corner of the town, and the city of Buffalo City and village of Cochrane are along the southwestern border.

According to the United States Census Bureau, the town has a total area of 34.4 square miles (89.2 km^{2}), of which 32.2 square miles (83.5 km^{2}) is land and 2.2 square miles (5.6 km^{2}), or 6.33%, is water.

== Demographics ==
As of the census of 2000, there were 442 people, 180 households, and 133 families residing in the town. The population density was 13.3 people per square mile (5.1/km^{2}). There were 222 housing units at an average density of 6.7 per square mile (2.6/km^{2}). The racial makeup of the town was 96.61% White, 2.04% Native American, 0.90% from other races, and 0.45% from two or more races. Hispanic or Latino of any race were 0.90% of the population.

There were 180 households, out of which 25.6% had children under the age of 18 living with them, 67.8% were married couples living together, 3.3% had a female householder with no husband present, and 26.1% were non-families. 21.1% of all households were made up of individuals, and 8.3% had someone living alone who was 65 years of age or older. The average household size was 2.46 and the average family size was 2.82.

In the town, the population was spread out, with 21.9% under the age of 18, 5.4% from 18 to 24, 26.5% from 25 to 44, 29.9% from 45 to 64, and 16.3% who were 65 years of age or older. The median age was 44 years. For every 100 females, there were 116.7 males. For every 100 females age 18 and over, there were 115.6 males.

The median income for a household in the town was $40,000, and the median income for a family was $55,500. Males had a median income of $30,909 versus $21,250 for females. The per capita income for the town was $20,297. About 6.2% of families and 10.4% of the population were below the poverty line, including 4.5% of those under age 18 and 10.9% of those age 65 or over.
