= Herold, Wisconsin =

- Unincorporated community
- Location within Wisconsin Location within the United States
- Coordinates: 44°18′20″N 91°50′32″W
- Country: United States
- State: Wisconsin
- County: Buffalo
- Town: Belvidere
- Elevation: 1,270 ft (390 m)
- Time zone: UTC-6 (Central (CST))
  - Summer (DST): UTC-5 (CDT)
- Area codes: 715 & 534
- GNIS feature ID: 1566324

Herold (/ˈhærəld/ HARR-əld) is an unincorporated community located in the town of Belvidere, in Buffalo County, Wisconsin, United States. Herold is located along County Highway E, 4 miles (6.4 km) east-southeast of Alma. The community was named for William Herold, a farmer who became the community's first postmaster when the post office opened in April 1891.
