= USS Herald =

USS Herald may refer to:

- USS Herald (1798), was built at Newburyport, Massachusetts, possibly in 1797. The US Navy purchased her in 1801. She became the French 20-gun privateer corvette Africaine. In 1804 a British privateer seized her on 4 May 1804 at Charleston, South Carolina. The seizure gave rise to a case in the U.S. courts that defined the limits of U.S. territorial waters. The U.S. courts ruled that the privateer had seized Africaine outside U.S. jurisdiction. Africaine then became a Liverpool-based slave ship that made two voyages carrying slaves from West Africa to the West Indies. After the abolition of the slave trade in 1807 she became a West Indiaman that two French privateers captured in late 1807 or early 1808.
- USS Herald (1861), a sailing ship, was one of a group of 16 old whaling vessels purchased by the US Navy in September 1861 and used as part of the Stone Fleet
- USS Herald (AM-101), was an Auk-class minesweeper launched in July 1942 and transferred to Mexico in 1973
