= Herald (1798 ship) =

Jersey-based privateering ship

History

Great Britain
- Name: Herald
- Captured: 1799

General characteristics
- Tons burthen: 80, or 101 (bm)
- Complement: 20, or 27, or 28
- Armament: 6 × 3&6-pounder guns + 4 swivel guns, or 10 × 3, 4, and 6-pounder guns

Herald, of Jersey, Thomas Peckslock, master, acquired a letter of marque on 15 January 1798.

On 14 February 1798, as the letter of marque Herald was about four leagues from the Bay of Naples with a cargo of cod fish, three French privateers attacked her. (Note: Although some accounts place the action in November 1798, this is clearly incorrect.)

In a three to four-hour action Herald repelled the attack, inflicting heavy casualties on her largest attacker. The three consisted of a cutter armed with five 18-pounder guns, a row galley with two 18-pounder guns, and a launch with one 18-pounder gun. Reportedly, the cutter suffered 14 men killed before she pulled back. The three privateers renewed their attack but Herald repelled them again. The British estimated the total French casualties at about 30 men killed and wounded. The British suffered no casualties.

That evening, or the next day, a felucca or launch, with 22 men aboard, attacked. When she was within 50 yards Herald fired a broadside, sinking the launch. There were no survivors. Herald then came into Naples.

Captain Pickstock, received presents and honours at Naples from Prince Augustus Frederick, Duke of Sussex, then in Naples, the British ambassador, Sir W. Hamilton, and other distinguished personages. The British merchants in Naples gathered $200 to be distributed to Herald's crew.

Pickstock and Herald then returned to Jersey. The entire voyage, Jersey–Naples–Jersey, had taken ten weeks.

On 21 August Lloyd's List (LL) reported that as Herald. Pickstock, master, was sailing from St Ubes to Labrador, she captured a Spanish packet ship of 10 guns and 19 men. The Spanish ship was on her way from Havana to Cadiz, and Herald sent her into Weymouth.

Fate: In January 1799 LL reported that as Herald, Pickstock, master, was sailing from Gallipoli, Apulia, to London, five Spanish frigates captured her and sent her into Cartagena, Spain. On 1 January 1799, off Cartagena, a Spanish frigate-squadron (Proserpina, Santa Teresa, Nuestra Señora de Guadalupe, and Pomona), commanded by Capitán de Navío Juan Pablo de Lodares, captured Herald.
