= Herald Island (Arctic) =

Uninhabited island in the Russian Arctic

Coordinates: 71°23′N 175°40′W

Russian: Остров Геральд
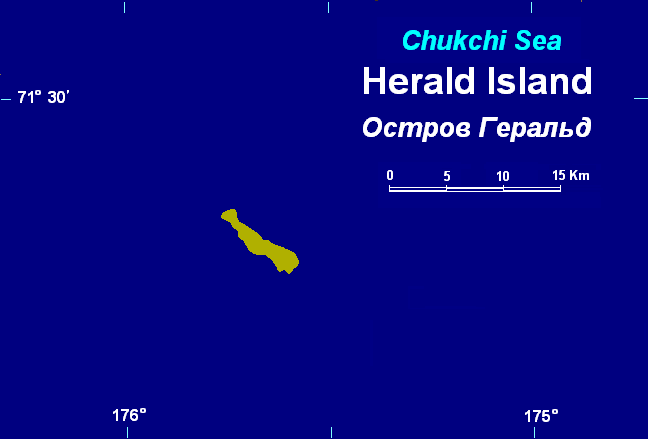
- Herald Island map

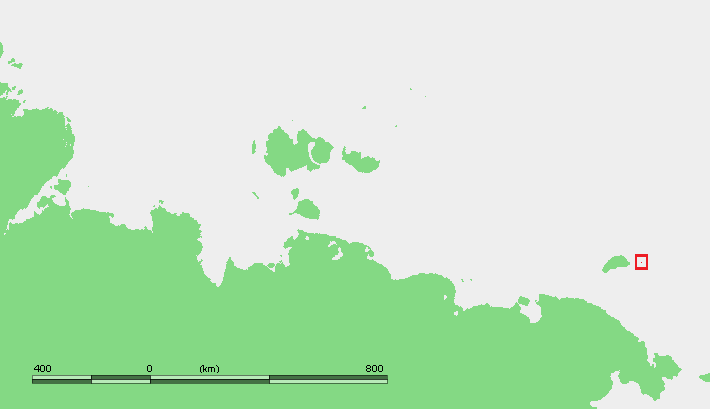
- Location of Herald Island; the larger island just to the west is Wrangel Island

- Herald Island in Chukotka Autonomous Okrug

Geography
- Area: 11.3 km^{2} (4.4 sq mi)
- Highest elevation: 364 m (1194 ft)

Administration
- Russia

Demographics
- Population: 0

Herald Island (Russian: Остров Геральд, romanized: Ostrov Gerald) is a small, isolated Russian island in the Chukchi Sea, 60 kilometres (30 nautical miles) east of Waring Point, Wrangel Island. It rises in sheer cliffs, making it quite inaccessible, either by ship or by plane. The only bit of accessible shoreline is at its northwestern point, where the cliffs have crumbled into piles of loose rocks and gravel. Its area is 11.3 km^{2} (4 3/8 sq mi) and the maximum height above sea level is 364 m (1,194 ft). The island is unglaciated and uninhabited.

Herald Island belongs administratively to the Chukotka Autonomous Okrug of the Russian Federation. Along with Wrangel Island, Herald Island has been part of the Wrangel Island Wildlife Preserve, a Russian National Park, since 1976. Cape Dmitrieva on Herald Island, marks the easternmost limits of the nature reserve.

Herald Island is named after survey vessel HMS Herald, from which the island was discovered in 1849.

The Scottish-American naturalist John Muir visited the island in 1881 on the steamship Thomas Corwin.

== Geology ==
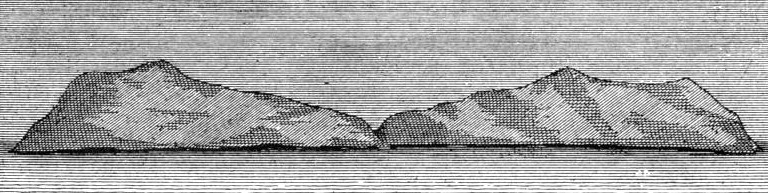
Herald Island; 1881 sketch by John Muir, who attributed the island's form to glacial action

Herald Island is composed of sedimentary, metamorphic, and igneous rocks. The northeastern tip of this island consists of a 600 m (2,000 ft) thick sequence of sandstone, phyllite, quartzose sandstone, quartz-chlorite-sericite schist mylonite, and cataclastic quartz syenite. These rocks are of either Proterozoic or Late Paleozoic age. The bulk of this island consists of a Jurassic granite pluton.

== Important Bird Area ==
Herald Island, along with nearby Wrangel Island, has been designated an Important Bird Area (IBA) by BirdLife International.

== Climate ==
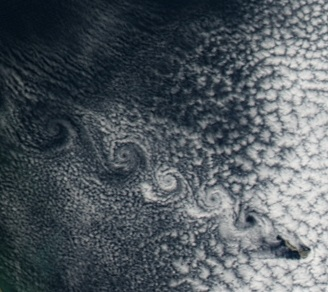
Low fog, moving north west, with Herald Island causing a Von Karman Vortex street to form, on August 19, 2008

The climate is severe. For most of the year, the region is covered by masses of cold Arctic air with low moisture and dust content. In summer, warmer and moister Pacific air blows from the south-east. Dry and strongly warmed air masses periodically blow from Siberia.

The polar day lasts from the middle of May until 20 July. The polar night lasts from the middle of November through the end of January.

Winters are prolonged, and characterized by sustained freezing weather and strong northern winds. The mean temperature in January is −21.3 °C (−6.3 °F), and the coldest months are February and March. During this period the temperature can remain below −30 °C (−22 °F) over a period of weeks, with frequent snowstorms and wind speeds of 40 m/s (80 kn) or more. The summer is cool, with some frosts and snowfall. The mean temperature in July fluctuates from 2 to 2.5 °C (35.6 to 36.5 °F). The mean relative humidity is around 88%, and the yearly precipitation is around 120 mm (4.7 in).

== History ==
Several nations have participated in the discovery and exploration of Herald Island. The island was discovered in 1849 by Sir Henry Kellett, captain of the survey vessel HMS Herald, who was searching for the vanished expedition of Sir John Franklin. Kellett landed on Herald Island and named it after his ship. He also sighted Wrangel Island in the distance.

Herald Island was next visited in 1855, by the USS Vincennes under Lieutenant John Rodgers. An attempt was made to reach Wrangel Island, which was inaccessible because of sea ice. The ill-fated Arctic expedition of George W. De Long in the USS Jeannette entered sea ice near Herald Island in 1879, hoping to reach Wrangel Island and open water near the North Pole. No landing was made, and the ship remained trapped in ice until it was finally crushed. In 1881, the USRC Thomas Corwin under Calvin L. Hooper searched Herald Island for message cairns or other signs that might have been left by the Jeannette crew. With the aid of John Muir's mountaineering skills, they were able to reach the top of the island and conduct a thorough search, as well as make geological and biological observations and collect specimens.

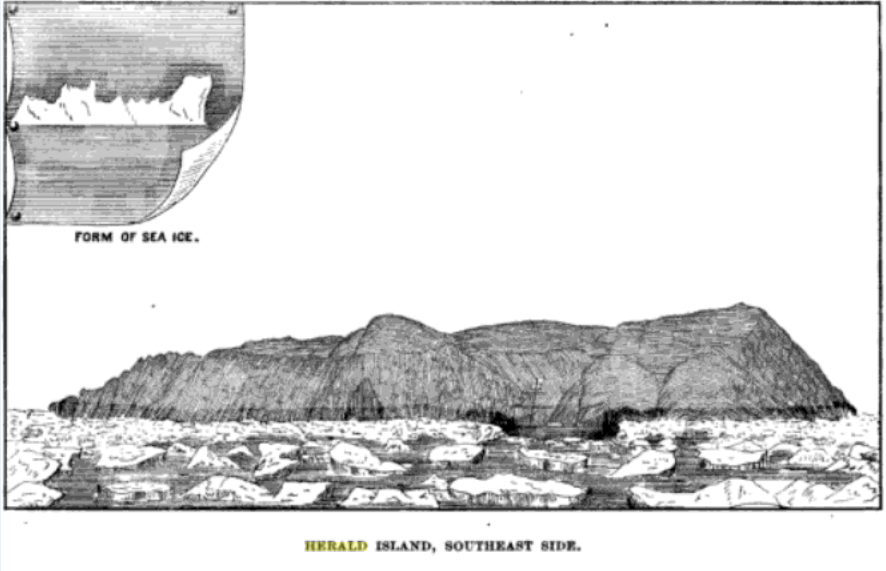
View of the southeast end of Herald Island, probably the Corwin landing site

No wintering has been recorded on Herald Island, but four crewmen of the ill-fated exploration ship Karluk, flagship of the Canadian Arctic Expedition, reached Herald Island in January 1914 after their ship sank crushed by ice. These four men, Sandy Anderson, Charles Barker, John Brady and Edmund L. Golightly, died there without leaving any record. Their skeletons were found in 1924 by Captain Louis Lane's expedition on the MS Herman. The cause of their death remains a mystery because there was enough food and ammunition in the place where their remains were found.

In 1916 the Russian ambassador in London issued an official notice to the effect that the Imperial government considered Herald, along with other Arctic islands, integral parts of the Russian Empire. This territorial claim was later maintained by the Soviet Union. In 1926, Georgy Ushakov's expedition aboard the Soviet icebreaking steamer Stavropol, led by Captain Pavel Milovzorov, approached Herald Island but was unable to come to shore because of thick sea ice. However, on its return voyage after landing Ushakov's party on Wrangel Island, Stavropol managed to break through to Herald Island, where Milovzorov raised the Soviet flag. The icebreaker Krassin made several attempts to reach Herald Island in 1935, while en route to Wrangel Island, but was hindered by thick fog. A landing was finally made on the return trip, when the island was fully surveyed. In 1932, hunting scenes for the film Eskimo were shot on the island.

Some U.S. individuals, including the group State Department Watch, assert American ownership of Herald Island based on the 1855 landing. A 1988 resolution of the Alaska State Senate supported this claim. However, the United States government has never claimed Herald Island, and recognizes it as Russian territory. In 1994, the Alaska State Supreme Court ruled in D. Denardo v. State of Alaska that Herald Island, along with several other islands, is not part of Alaska.

In 2004 Herald Island and neighboring Wrangel Island, along with their surrounding waters, were added to UNESCO's World Heritage List.

== See also ==
- List of islands of Russia
