= HMS Herald =

Five ships of the Royal Navy have been named HMS Herald:

- HMS Herald (1806) was an 18-gun ship sloop launched in 1806, re-classed as a 20-gun sixth rate in 1810 and 24-gun in 1817, and broken up in 1817.
- HMS Herald (1824) was a 500-ton, 28-gun sixth-rate, launched as HMS Termagant in 1822 and renamed in 1824. She served as a survey ship under Henry Kellett and Henry Mangles Denham and was sold in 1864.
- HMS Herald (1890) was a paddle river gunboat launched in 1890 and sold in 1903.
- HMS Herald (1923) was a 24-class minesweeping sloop launched as HMS Merry Hampton in 1918, renamed in 1923 and converted to a survey ship. She was scuttled in 1942 at Seletar, Singapore Naval Base, raised by the Japanese, renamed Heiyo, and sunk by a mine on 14 November 1944.
- HMS Herald (H138) was a hydrographic survey ship launched in 1973 and sold in 2001.
