= Ushakovsky =

Ushakovsky (Russian: Ушаковский; masculine), Ushakovskaya (Ушаковская; feminine), or Ushakovskoye (Ушаковское; neuter) is the name of several rural localities in Russia:

- Ushakovsky (rural locality), a khutor in Kolundayevskoye Rural Settlement of Sholokhovsky District of Rostov Oblast
- Ushakovskoye, Arkhangelsk Oblast, a selo in Mikhaylovsky Selsoviet of Shenkursky District of Arkhangelsk Oblast
- Ushakovskoye, Chukotka Autonomous Okrug, a selo in Iultinsky District of Chukotka Autonomous Okrug; for many years the main populated place on Wrangel Island
- Ushakovskoye, Kurgan Oblast, a selo in Ushakovsky Selsoviet of Kataysky District of Kurgan Oblast
- Ushakovskaya, Lensky District, Arkhangelsk Oblast, a village in Slobodchikovsky Selsoviet of Lensky District of Arkhangelsk Oblast
- Ushakovskaya, Velsky District, Arkhangelsk Oblast, a village in Blagoveshchensky Selsoviet of Velsky District of Arkhangelsk Oblast
- Ushakovskaya, Vologda Oblast, a village in Noginsky Selsoviet of Syamzhensky District of Vologda Oblast
