= Zvyozdny, Chukotka Autonomous Okrug =

Zvyozdny Звёздный
- Settlement (abolished)
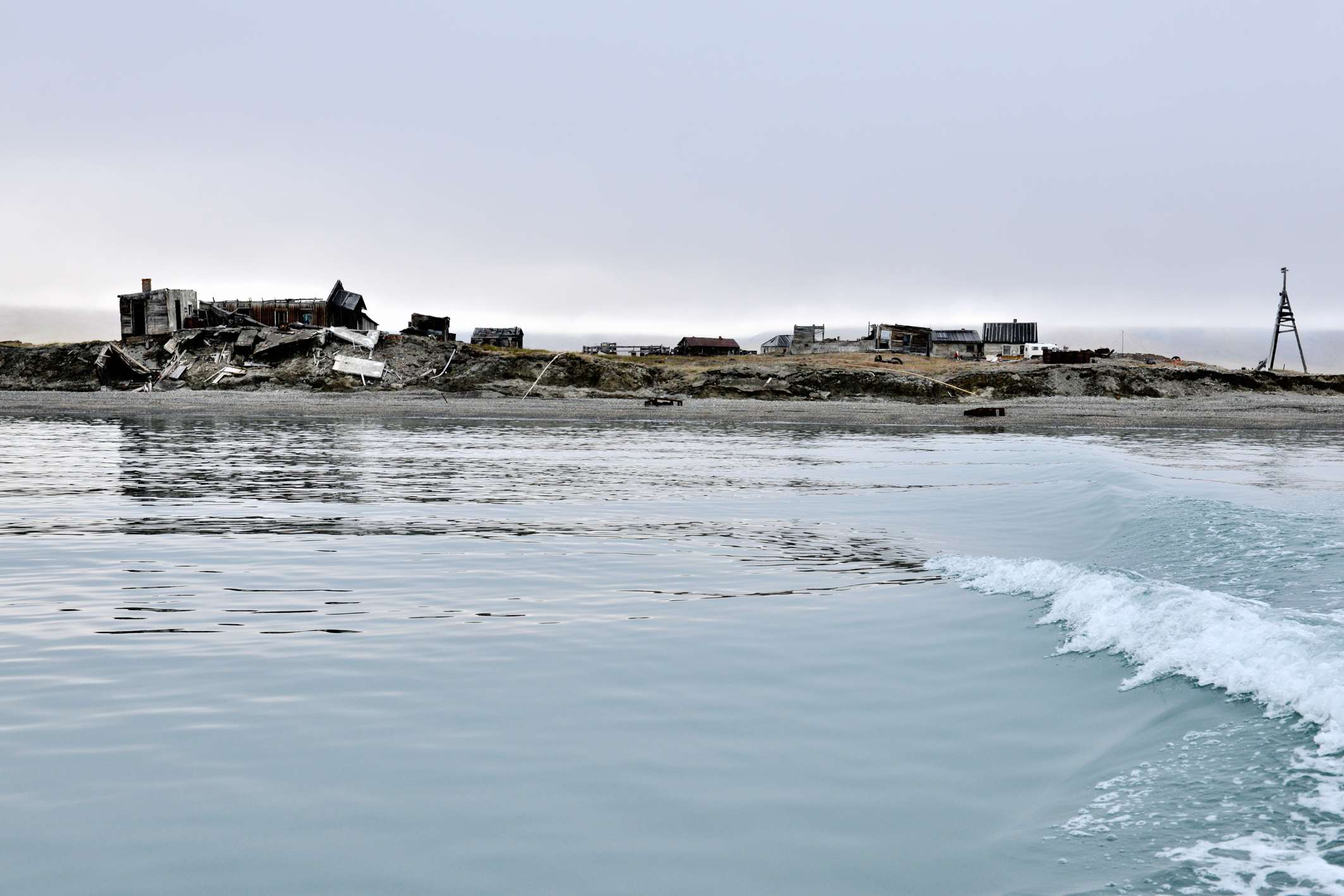
- Interactive map of Zvyozdny
- Location of Zvyozdny Zvyozdny (Chukotka Autonomous Okrug)
- Coordinates: 70°56′00″N 179°36′00″W
- Country: Russia
- Federal subject: Chukotka Autonomous Okrug
- Administrative district: Iultinsky
- Founded: 1960s
- Abolished: 1970s

Municipal status
  - Municipal district: Iultinsky

Zvyozdny (Russian: Звёздный, lit. 'Star') is an abandoned settlement on Wrangel Island, in Chukotka Autonomous Okrug, Russia. It was abandoned in the 1970s.

== Geography ==
Zvyozdny is located on the southern shore of Wrangel Island, west of Ushakovskoye. It is approximately 702 km from Anadyr, and approximately 5,634 km from Moscow.

== History ==
=== Early history ===
The earliest evidence of human habitation in the area dates back to between 2,850 and 3,360 years ago, in the form of knives, harpoons, and other tools from the Paleo-Inuit culture. These ancient inhabitants hunted marine mammals to survive.

=== Modern history ===
Wrangel Island was first discovered by Thomas Long, an American whaler. It was claimed by the Russian Empire in 1916, and then by the U.S.S.R. in 1924. The settlement was founded by the Soviet government in the 1960s, but then abolished in the 1970s. The only remaining inhabited area is the Zvyozdny airbase, which was constructed by the Soviets at Cape Hawaii. The base is equipped with S-300 air defence systems, Pantsir-S1 anti-aircraft systems, and Rubezh anti-ship coastal systems, as well as radar and electronic warfare capabilities. Training has been held there in recent years.

== Climate ==
The climate of Zvyozdny is arctic, or ET under the Köppen climate classification.
