= Cape Hawaii =

Headland in Chukotka Autonomous Okrug, Russian Federation

Cape Hawaii Мыс Гавайи
- Cape
- Coordinates: 71°1′30″N 177°54′56″W
- Location: Wrangel Island
- Offshore water bodies: Chukchi Sea

Area
  - Total: Chukotka, Russian Far East
- Elevation: 96 m (315 ft)

Cape Hawaii (Russian: Мыс Гавайи) is a headland of Wrangel Island. Administratively it belongs to the Chukotka Autonomous Okrug, Russian Federation.

This cape is located on the southeastern coast of Wrangel Island, facing the Chukchi Sea, about 40 km (25 mi) east of Rodgers Harbor.

== History ==
Cape Hawaii was named in August 1867 by Thomas Long, the captain of American whaling bark Nile, after the Hawaiian Islands, where his ship was based. On 23 August 1881 the headland was the first point of Wrangel Island sighted by Lieutenant Robert M. Berry on USS Rodgers during the search for the Jeannette.

In the 1960s, a radar station of the Soviet Air Defence Forces was built on Cape Hawaii. The military personnel lived in it autonomously with supplies delivered by air. They rarely visited neighboring Ushakovskoye village, and only following an invitation of local authorities or in connection with significant events. In 1992 the military radar installation at Cape Hawaii was closed.

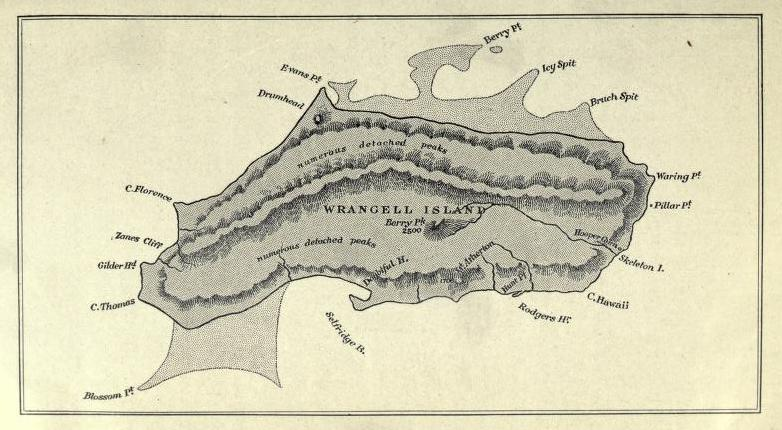
1913 map of Wrangel Island.

== See also ==
- List of research stations in the Arctic
- Waring Point
