= Gora Sovetskaya =

Mountain in Chukotka, Russia

- Berry Peak
- Location within Chukotka Autonomous Okrug

Highest point
- Elevation: 1,096 m (3,596 ft)
- Prominence: 1,096 m (3,596 ft)
- Listing: Ribu
- Coordinates: 71°05′50″N 179°21′24″W

Geography
- Location: Chukotka, Russian Far East
- Parent range: Central Range, Wrangel Island

Gora Sovetskaya (Russian: гора советская, meaning "Soviet Mountain"), also known as Berry Peak, is a mountain on Wrangel Island. Administratively it is part of the Chukotka Autonomous Okrug, Russian Federation.

This 1,096-metre-high (3,596 ft) mountain is the highest point of Wrangel Island. It is located in the area near the center of the island, in the Central Mountain Range that runs across Wrangel Island from east to west.

== History ==
The mountain is conspicuous from the sea and was first described by Captain Thomas Long in 1867 as having "the appearance of an extinct volcano." It was named "Berry Peak" by the United States Navy in 1881 after U.S. Navy Lieutenant Robert M. Berry, commanding officer of the steamer USS Rodgers, who led the group which landed on the island. As a result of the surveys of the time, Berry Peak was marked as a 762-metre-high (2,500-foot) mountain by the United States Coast and Geodetic Survey. By the early 20th century other surveys of the mountain had been carried out from the shore, but once inland it was not clear which mountain was "Berry Peak."

The mountain was properly surveyed in 1938, by which time the island had become part of the Russian Soviet Federative Socialist Republic in the Soviet Union. The correct elevation was found to be 1,096 m (3,596 ft) and the peak was named Gora Sovetskaya.

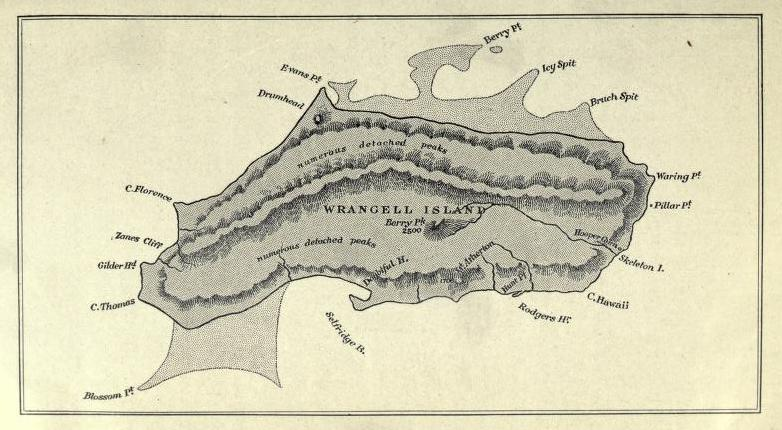
1913 map of Wrangel Island.

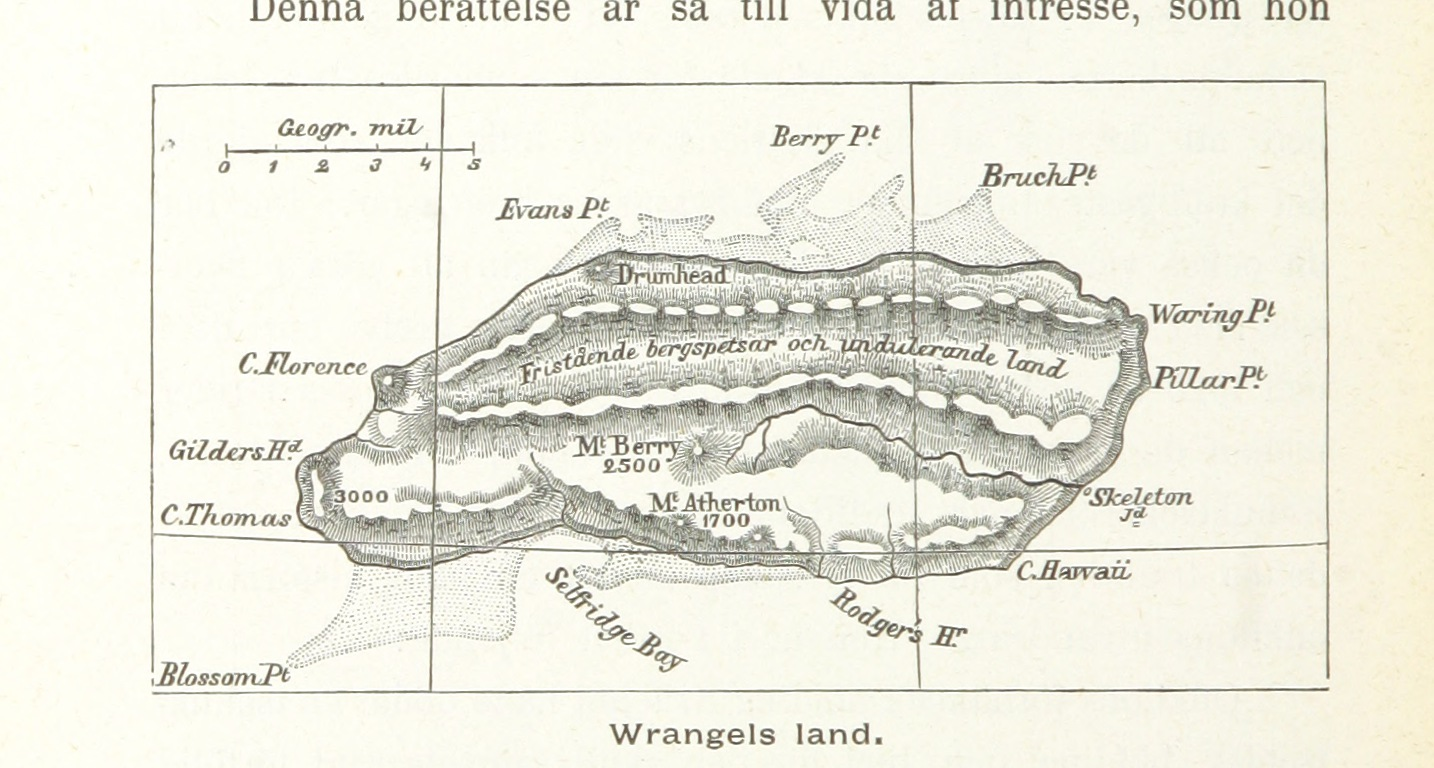
Old map of Wrangel Island with the peak marked as "Mount Berry."

== See also ==
- List of mountains in Russia
- List of islands by highest point
- Topographic isolation
