= Waring Point =

Headland on Wrangel Island, Russia

Waring Point Мыс Уэринг
- Headland
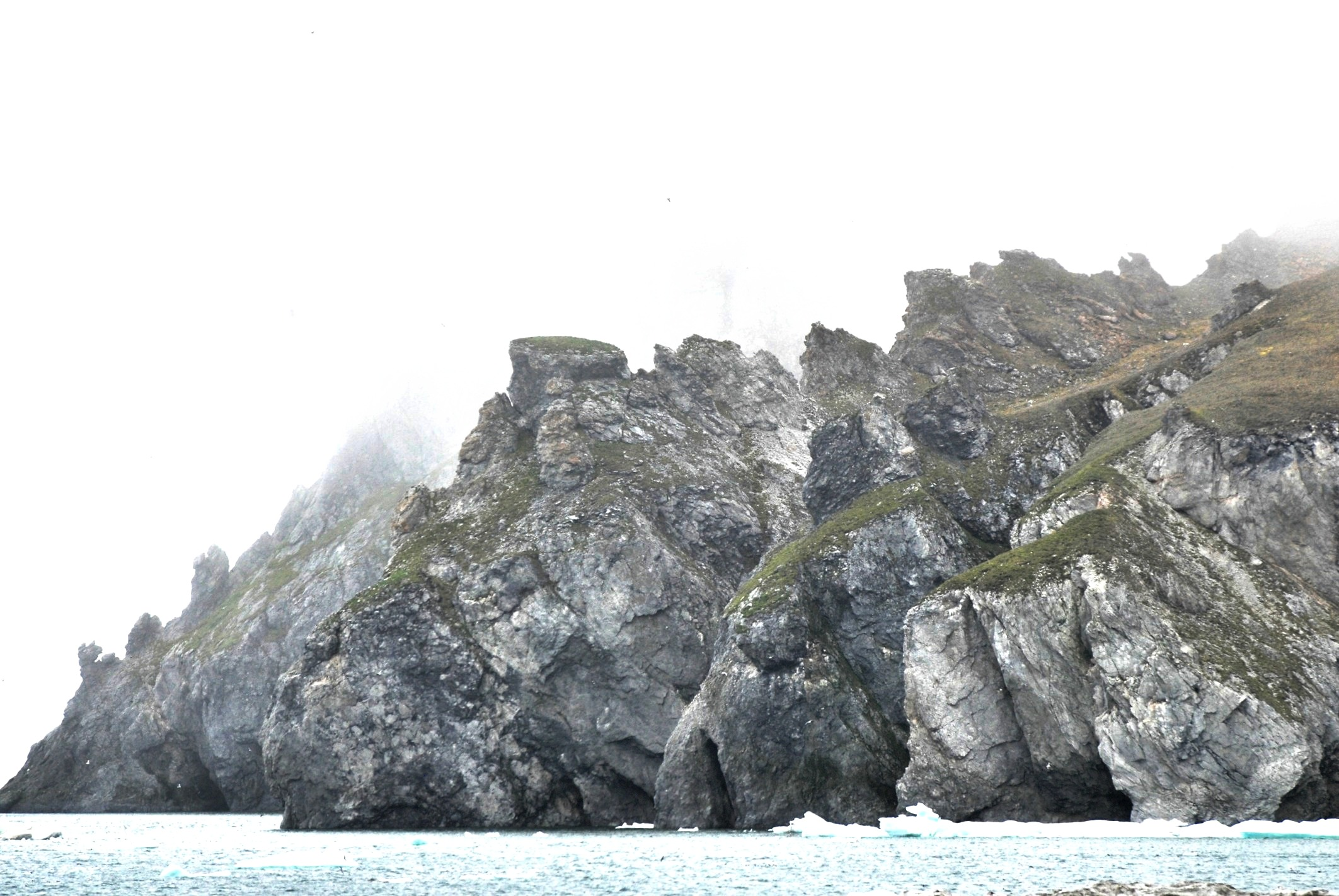
- View of the cliffs at Waring point

- Coordinates: 71°15′46″N 177°27′4″W
- Location: Wrangel Island
- Offshore water bodies: Chukchi Sea

Area
  - Total: Chukotka, Russian Far East
- Elevation: 221 m (725 ft)

Waring Point (Russian: Мыс Уэринг) is a headland of the Chukchi Sea. Administratively, it belongs to the Chukotka, Russian Federation.

It is the easternmost point of Wrangel Island.

This headland was named in 1881 after Lieutenant Waring of USS Rodgers, commanded by Lieutenant Robert M. Berry. Lt. Waring was the first to land at this point.

Very large numbers of birds are nesting on the cliffs of this cape, including the horned puffin, tufted puffin, thick-billed murre, glaucous gull and pelagic cormorant.

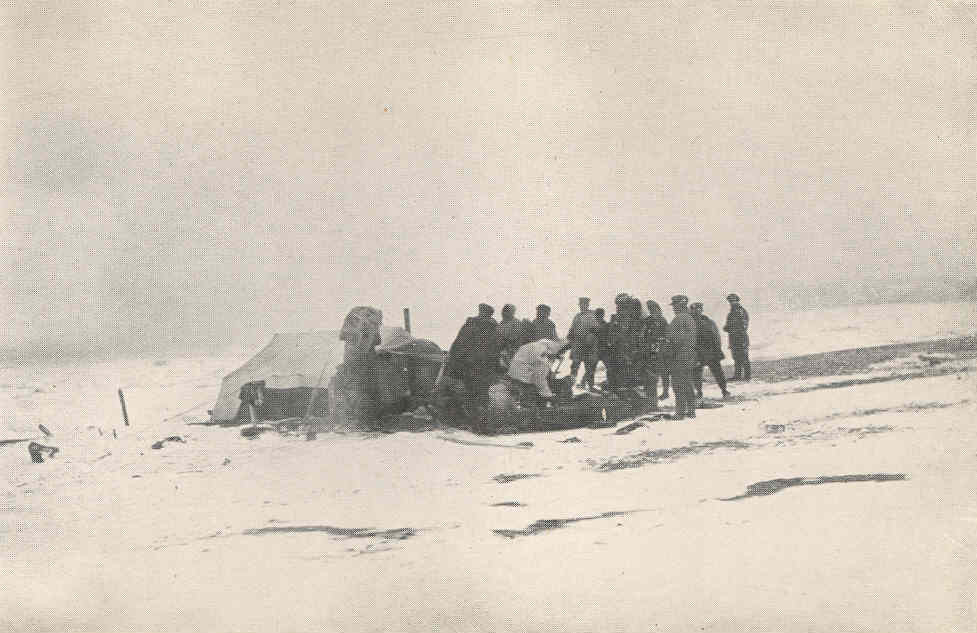
Rescue of the party at Waring Point during the last voyage of the Karluk.

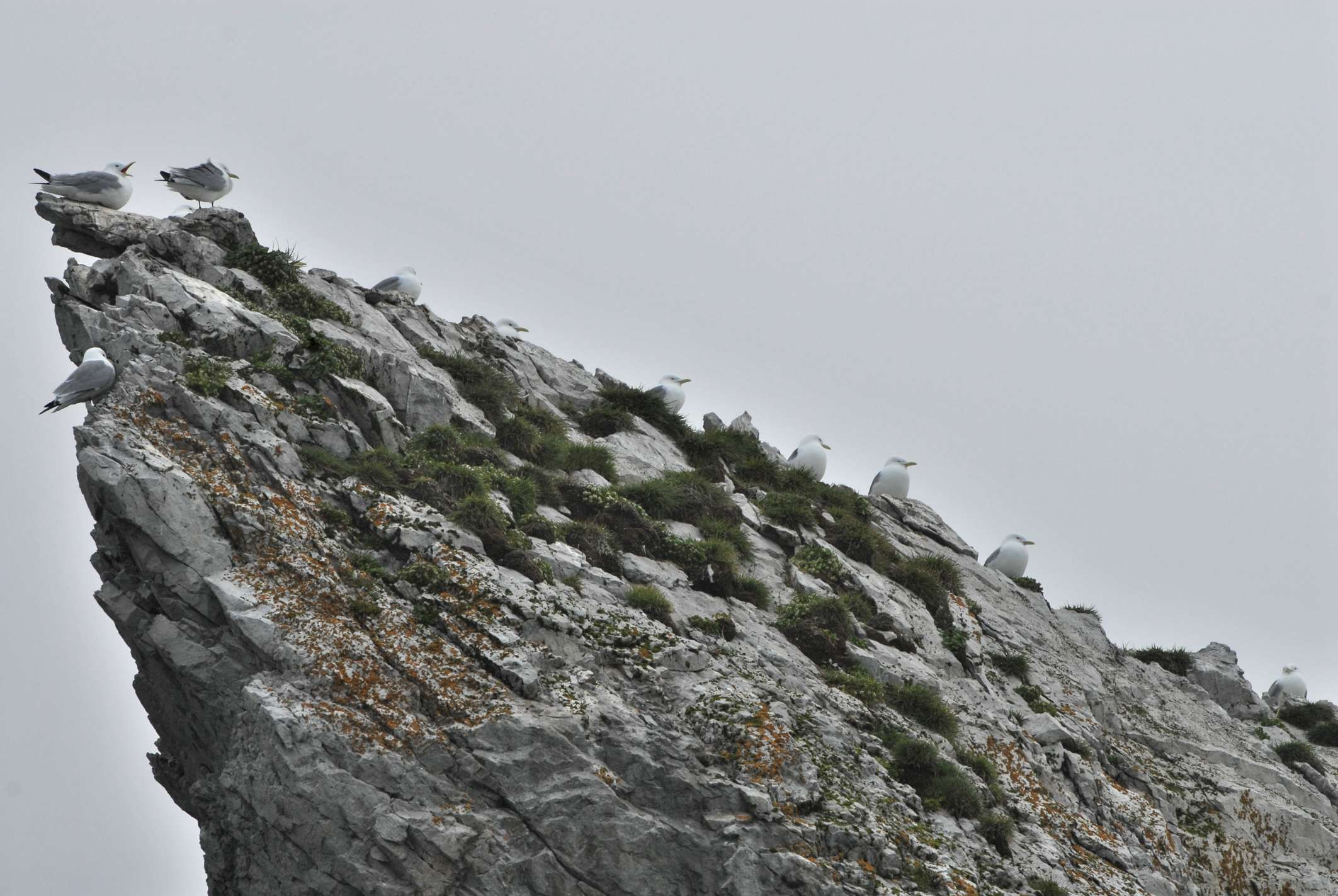
Black-legged kittiwakes at Waring Point.
