= Ushakovskaya, Vologda Oblast =

Ushakovskaya Ушаковская
- Village
- Location within Vologda Oblast Location within Russia
- Coordinates: 59°58′N 41°05′E
- Country: Russia
- Region: Vologda Oblast
- District: Syamzhensky District
- Time zone: UTC+3:00

Ushakovskaya (Russian: Ушаковская) is a rural locality (a village) in Noginskoye Rural Settlement, Syamzhensky District, Vologda Oblast, Russia. The population was 7 as of 2002.

== Geography ==
Ushakovskaya is located 6 km south of Syamzha (the district's administrative centre) by road. Trubakovo is the nearest rural locality.
