= Wrangel Island =

Russian island in the Arctic Ocean

Native name: Kellett Land (English); Остров Врангеля (Russian); Умӄиԓир (Chukot)
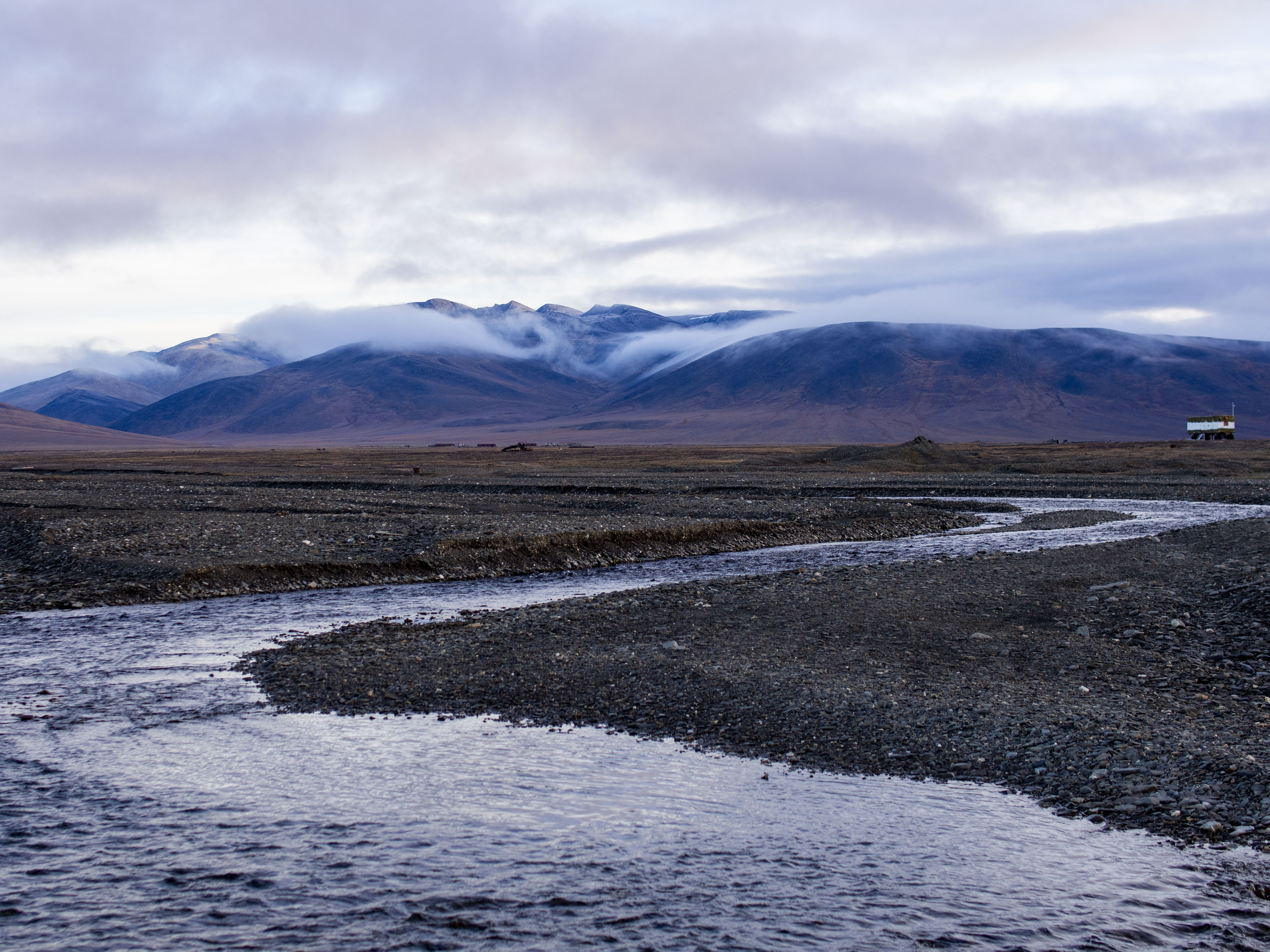
- Wrangel Island in October 2018

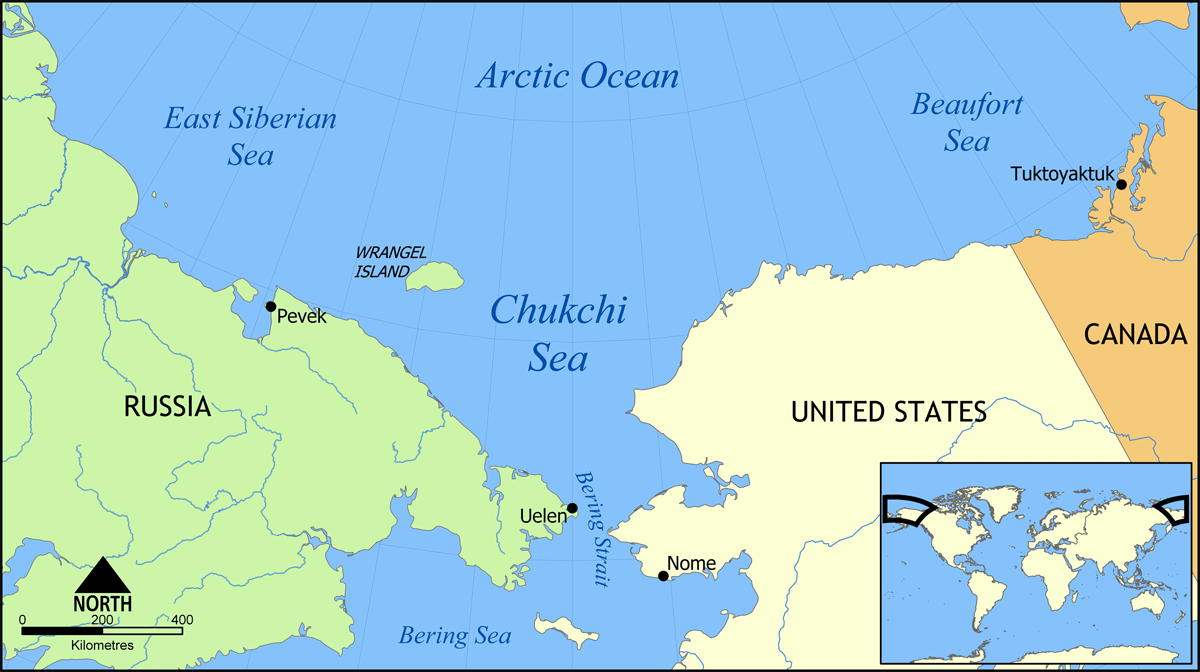
- Wrangel Island (just left of centre)

Geography
- Location: Near Chukchi Sea
- Coordinates: 71°14′N 179°25′W
- Area: 7,600 km^{2} (2,900 sq mi)
- Highest elevation: 1,096 m (3596 ft)
- Highest point: Soviet Mountain

Administration
- Russia
- Federal District: Far Eastern
- Autonomous Okrug: Chukotka

Demographics
- Population: 0

UNESCO World Heritage Site
- Official name: Natural System of Wrangel Island Reserve
- Type: Natural
- Criteria: ix, x
- Designated: 2004 (28th session)
- Reference no.: 1023rev
- Region: Asia

Map of Wrangel Island

Wrangel Island (Russian: О́стров Вра́нгеля, romanized: Ostrov Vrangelya, IPA: [ˈostrəf ˈvrangʲɪlʲə]; Chukot: Умӄиԓир, romanized: Umqiḷir, IPA: [umqiɬir], lit. 'island of polar bears') is an island of the Chukotka Autonomous Okrug, Russia. It is the 92nd-largest island in the world and roughly the size of Crete. Located in the Arctic Ocean between the Chukchi Sea and East Siberian Sea, the island lies astride the 180th meridian. The International Date Line is therefore displaced eastwards at this latitude to keep the island, as well as the Chukchi Peninsula on the Russian mainland, on the same day as the rest of Russia. The closest land to Wrangel Island is the tiny and rocky Herald Island located 60 kilometres (32 nmi) to the east. Its straddling the 180th meridian makes its north shore at that point both the northeasternmost and northwesternmost point of land in the world by strict longitude; using the International Date Line instead, those respective points become Herald Island and Alaska's Cape Lisburne.

Most of Wrangel Island, with the adjacent Herald Island, is a federally protected nature sanctuary administered by Russia's Ministry of Natural Resources and Environment. In 1976, Wrangel Island and all of its surrounding waters were classified as a "zapovednik" (a "strict nature reserve") and, as such, receive the highest level of protection, excluding virtually all human activity other than conservation research and scientific purposes. In 1999, the Chukotka Regional government extended the protected marine area to 24 nmi (44 km) offshore. As of 2003, there were four rangers who reside on the island year-round, while a core group of about 12 scientists conduct research during the summer months. Wrangel Island was home to the last generally accepted surviving population of woolly mammoths, with radiocarbon dating suggesting they persisted on the island until around 4,000 years ago.

The natural complex of the Wrangel Island Reserve has been included in the UNESCO World Heritage List since 2004.

== Toponymy ==
Captain Thomas Long named Wrangel Island after Baron Ferdinand von Wrangel, who was a Baltic German explorer and Admiral in the Imperial Russian Navy. Captain Long, published in The Honolulu Advertiser, November 1867:

I have named this northern land Wrangell Land as an appropriate tribute to the memory of a man who spent three consecutive years north of latitude 68°, and demonstrated the problem of this open polar sea forty-five years ago, although others of much later date have endeavored to claim the merit of this discovery.

Baron von Wrangel never managed to visit the island. Wrangel had noticed swarms of birds flying north, and, questioning the native population, determined that there must be an island undiscovered by Europeans existing in the Arctic Ocean. He searched for it during his Kolymskaya expedition (1823–1824), but failed to find it.

== Geography ==
Wrangel Island is about 150 km (93 mi) long from east to west and 80 km (50 mi) wide from north to south, with an area of 7,600 km^{2} (2,900 sq mi). It is separated from the Siberian mainland by the De Long Strait, and the island itself is a landmark separating the East Siberian Sea from the Chukchi Sea on the northern end. The distance to the closest point on the mainland is 140 km (87 mi).

The island's topography consists of a southern coastal plain that is on average 15 km (9.3 mi) wide; a 40 km (25 mi) wide east-west trending central belt of low-relief mountains, with the highest elevations at the Tsentral'nye Mountain Range; and a roughly 25 km (16 mi) wide northern coastal plain. The highest mountain on this island is Gora Sovetskaya with an elevation of 1,096 m (3,596 ft) above mean sea level, although mostly the mountains are a little over 500 m (1,600 ft) above mean sea level. The island's mountain ranges terminate at sea cliffs at either end of the island. Blossom Point is the westernmost point and Waring Point (Mys Uering) the easternmost point of the island. Despite its mountainous terrain and high latitude, Wrangel Island is not glaciated.

Wrangel Island belongs administratively to the Chukotka Autonomous Okrug of the Russian Federation. The island has a weather station at Blossom Point and, formerly, two Chukchi fishing settlements on the southern side of the island (Ushakovskoye and Zvyozdny on the shore of Somnitelnaya Bay).

== Geology ==
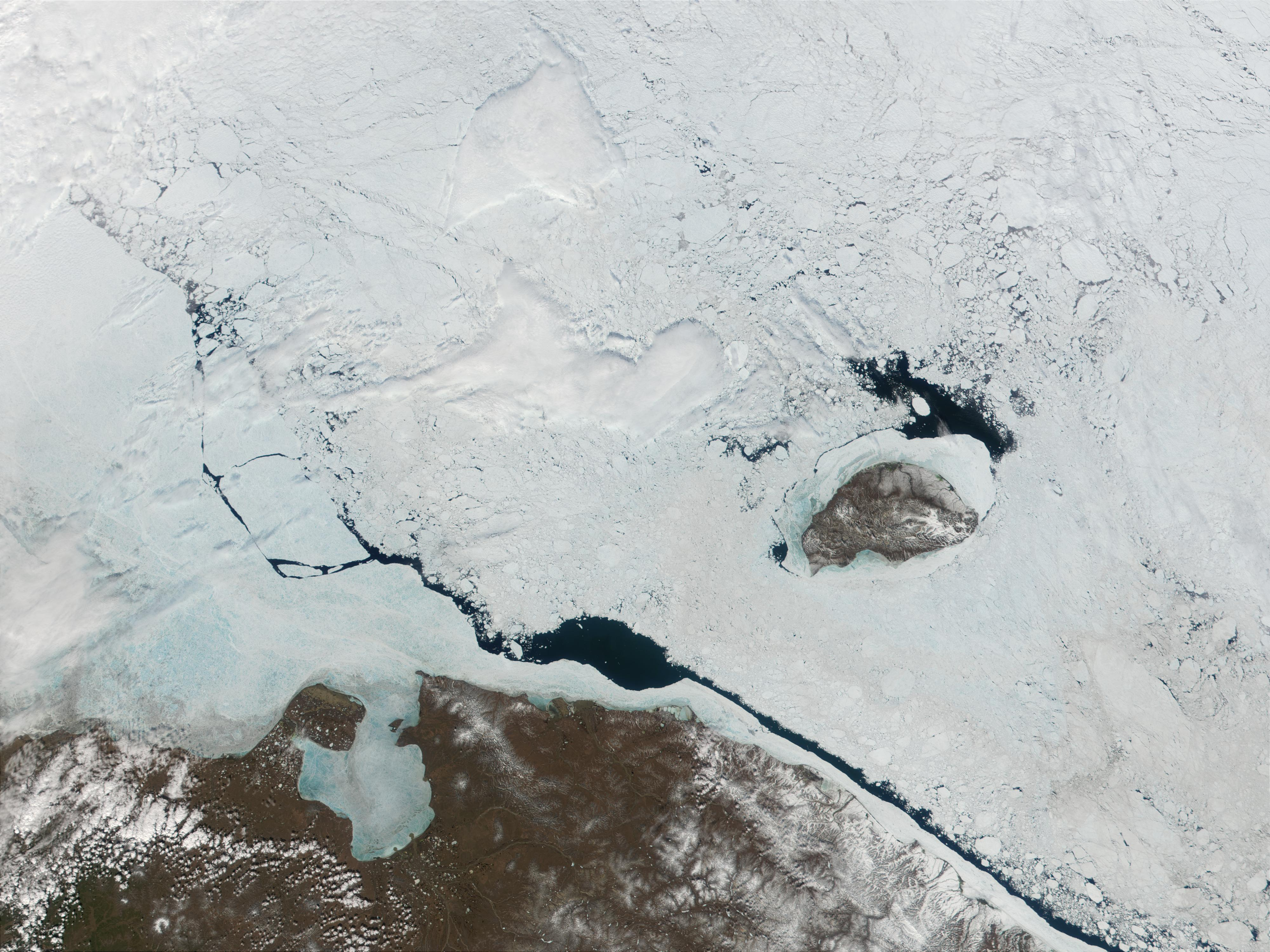
True colour MODIS photograph of Wrangel Island, taken in June 2001. Chaunskaya Bay is visible towards the bottom of the image

Wrangel Island consists of folded, faulted, and metamorphosed volcanic, intrusive, and sedimentary rocks ranging in age from Upper Precambrian to Lower Mesozoic. The Precambrian rocks, which are about 2 km (6,600 ft) thick, consist of Upper Proterozoic sericite and chlorite slate and schist that contain minor amounts of metavolcanic rocks, metaconglomerates, and quartzite. These rocks are intruded by metamorphosed gabbro, diabase, and felsic dikes and sills and granite intrusions. Overlying the Precambrian strata are up to 2.25 km (7,400 ft) of Upper Silurian to Lower Carboniferous consisting of interbedded sandstone, siltstone, slate, argillite, some conglomerate and rare limestone and dolomite. These strata are overlain by up to 2.15 km (7,100 ft) of Carboniferous to Permian limestone, often composed largely of crinoid plates, that is interbedded with slate, argillite and locally minor amounts of thick breccia, sandstone, and chert. The uppermost stratum consists of 0.7 to 1.5 km (2,300 to 4,900 ft) of Triassic clayey quartzose turbidites interbedded with black slate and siltstone.

A thin veneer of Cenozoic gravel, sand, clay and mud underlie the coastal plains of Wrangel Island. Late Neogene clay and gravel, which are only a few tens of meters thick, rest upon the eroded surface of the folded and faulted strata that compose Wrangel Island. Indurated Pliocene mud and gravel, which are only a few meters thick, overlie the Late Neogene sediments. Sandy Pleistocene sediments occur as fluvial sediments along rivers and streams and as a very thin and patchy surficial layer of either colluvium or eluvium.

Wrangel Island coastline

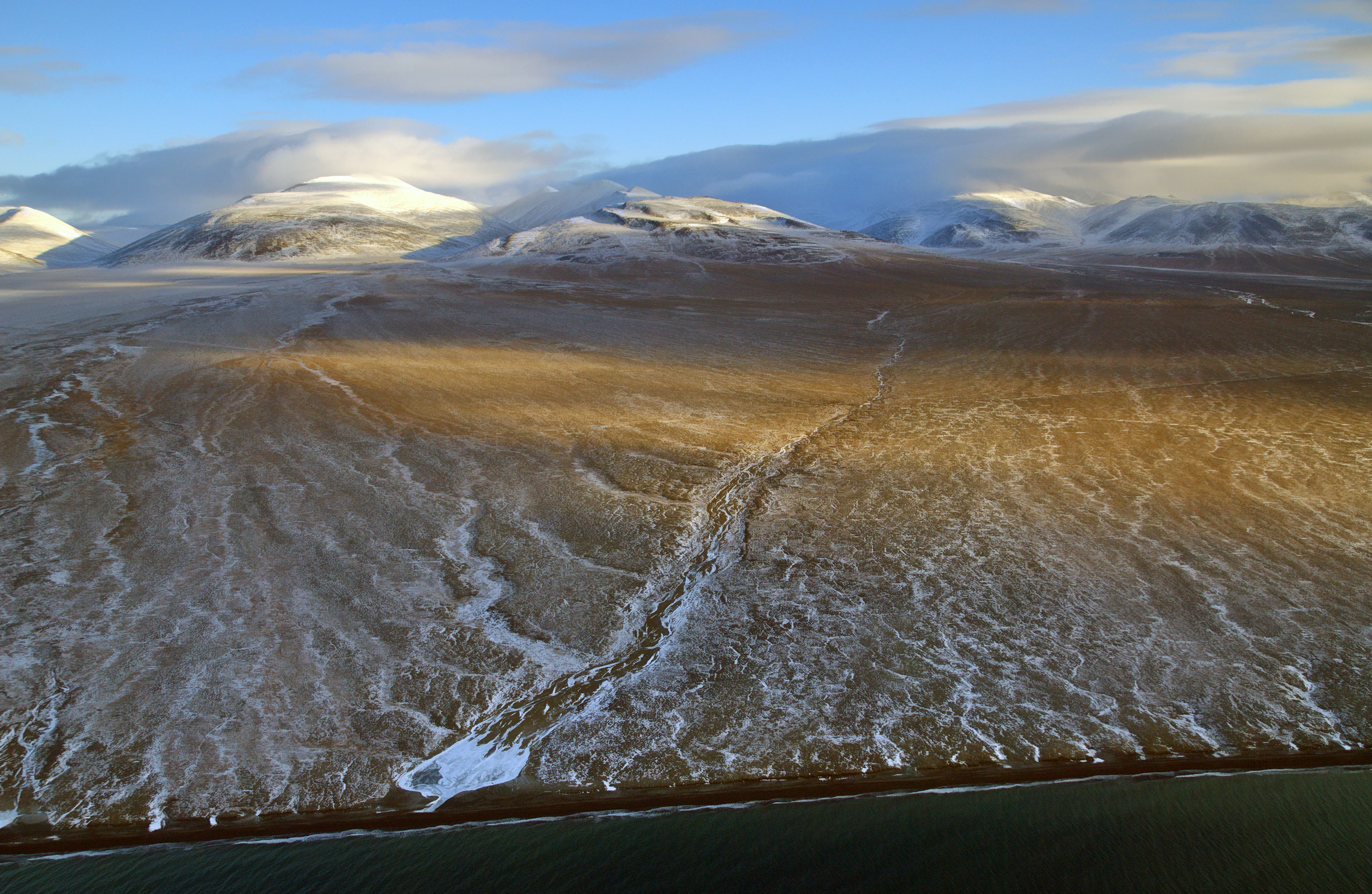

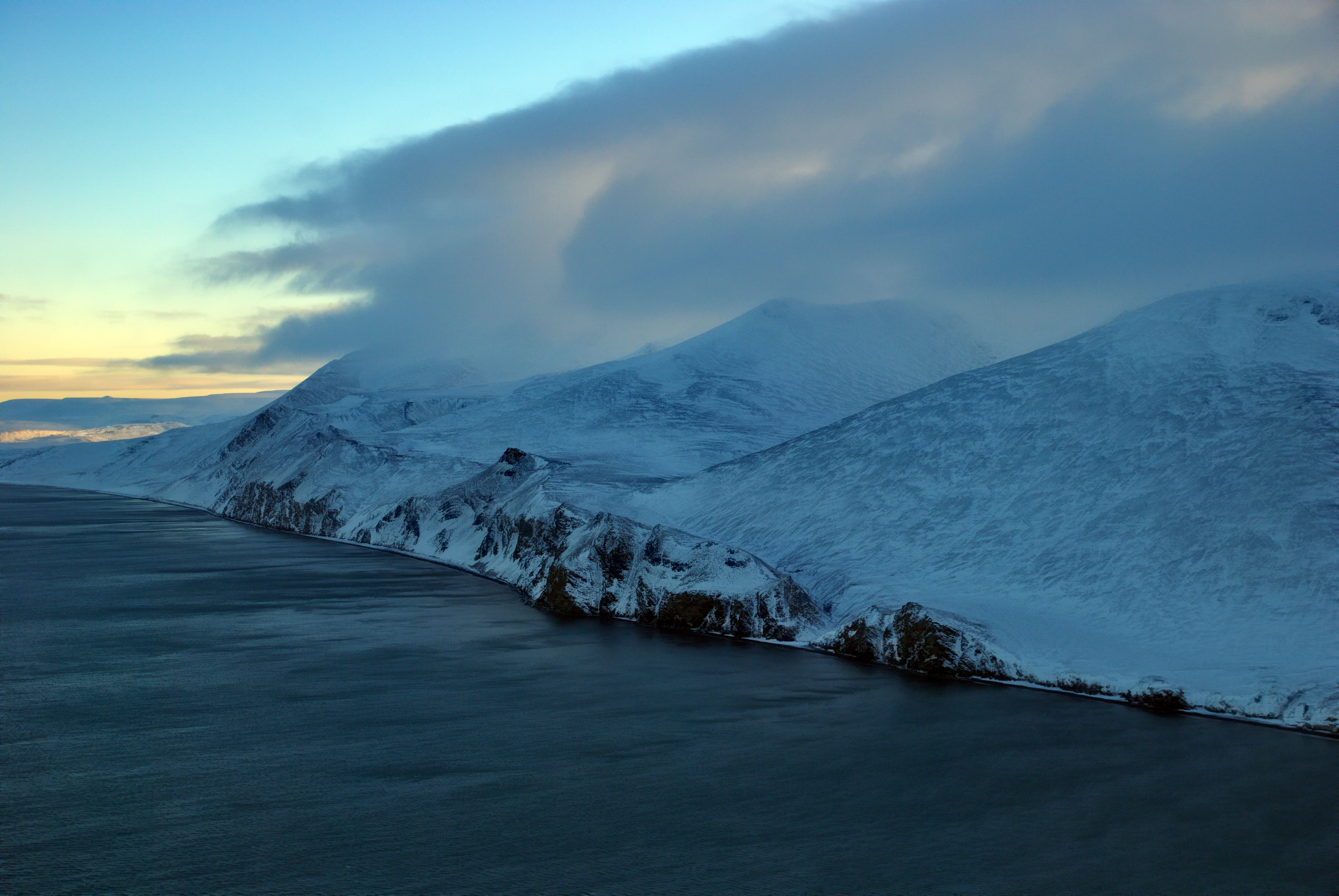

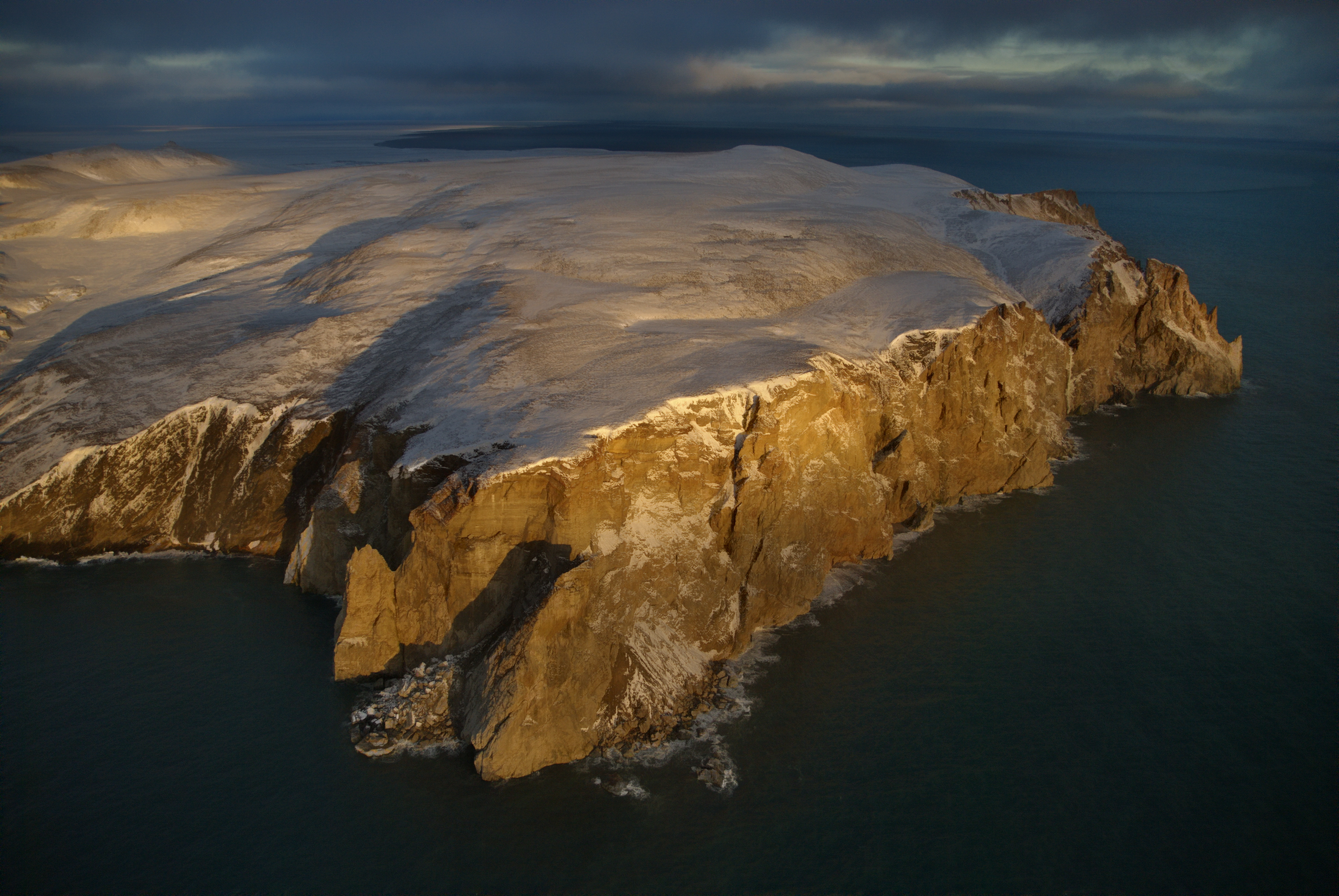

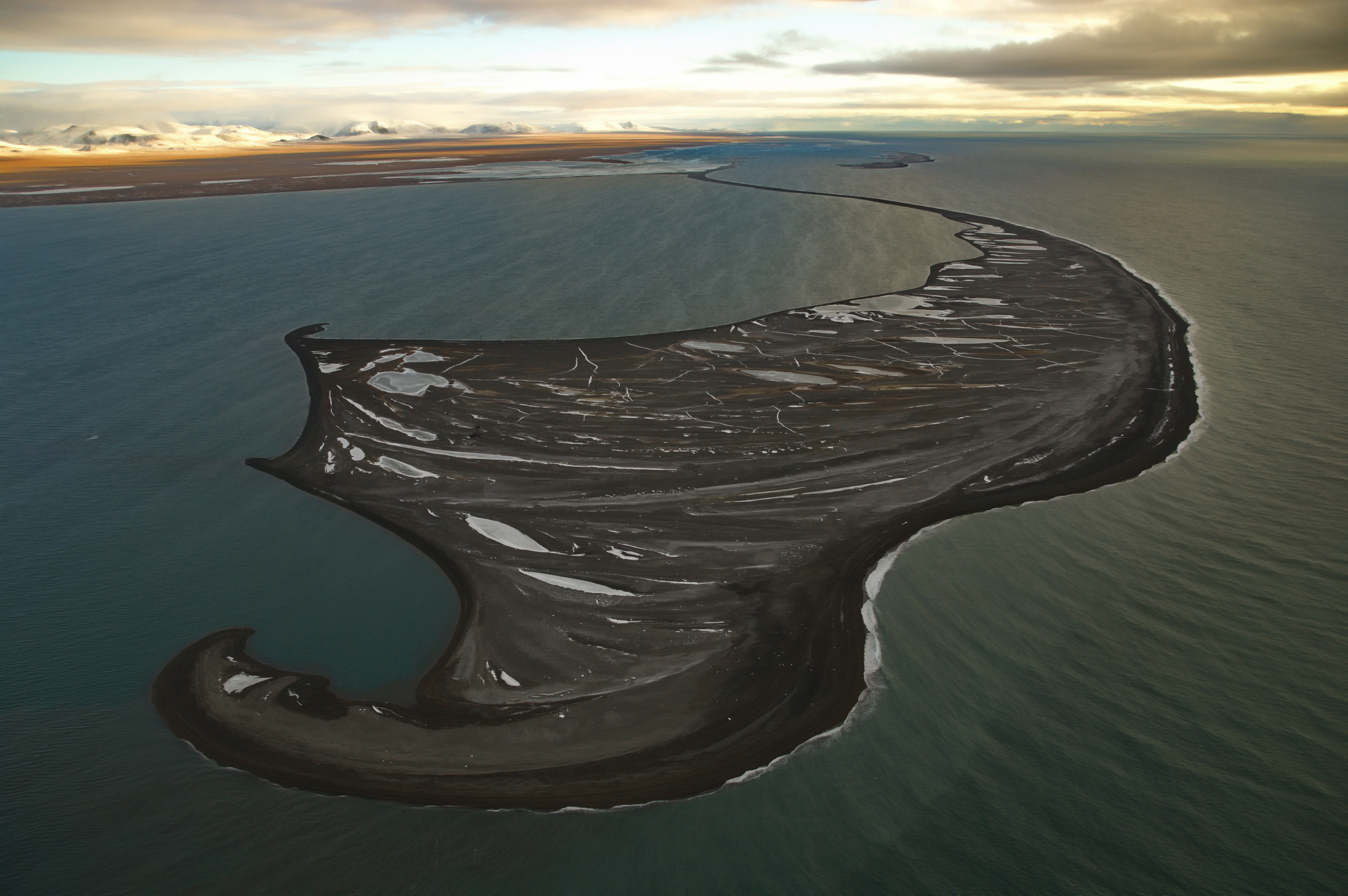

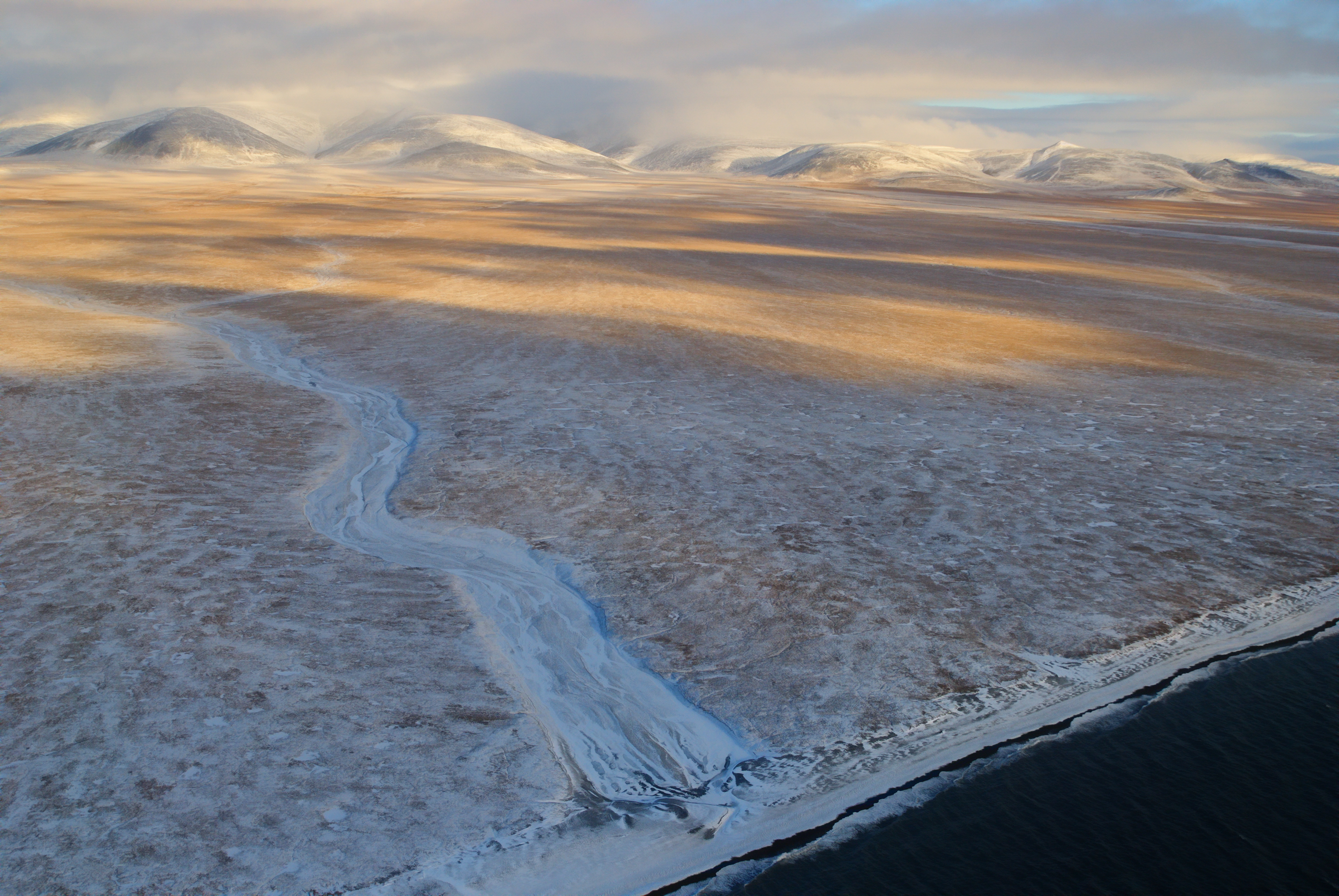

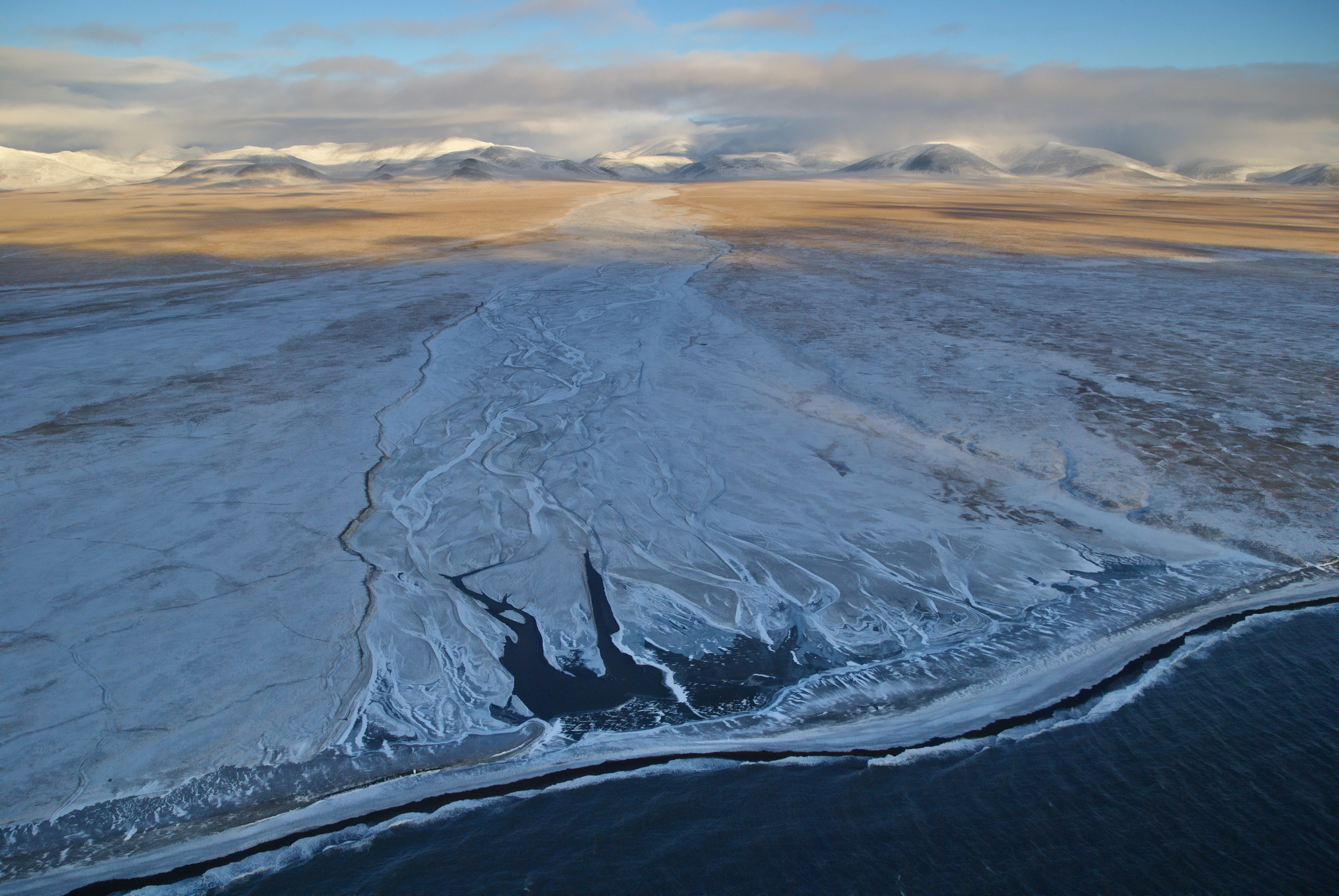

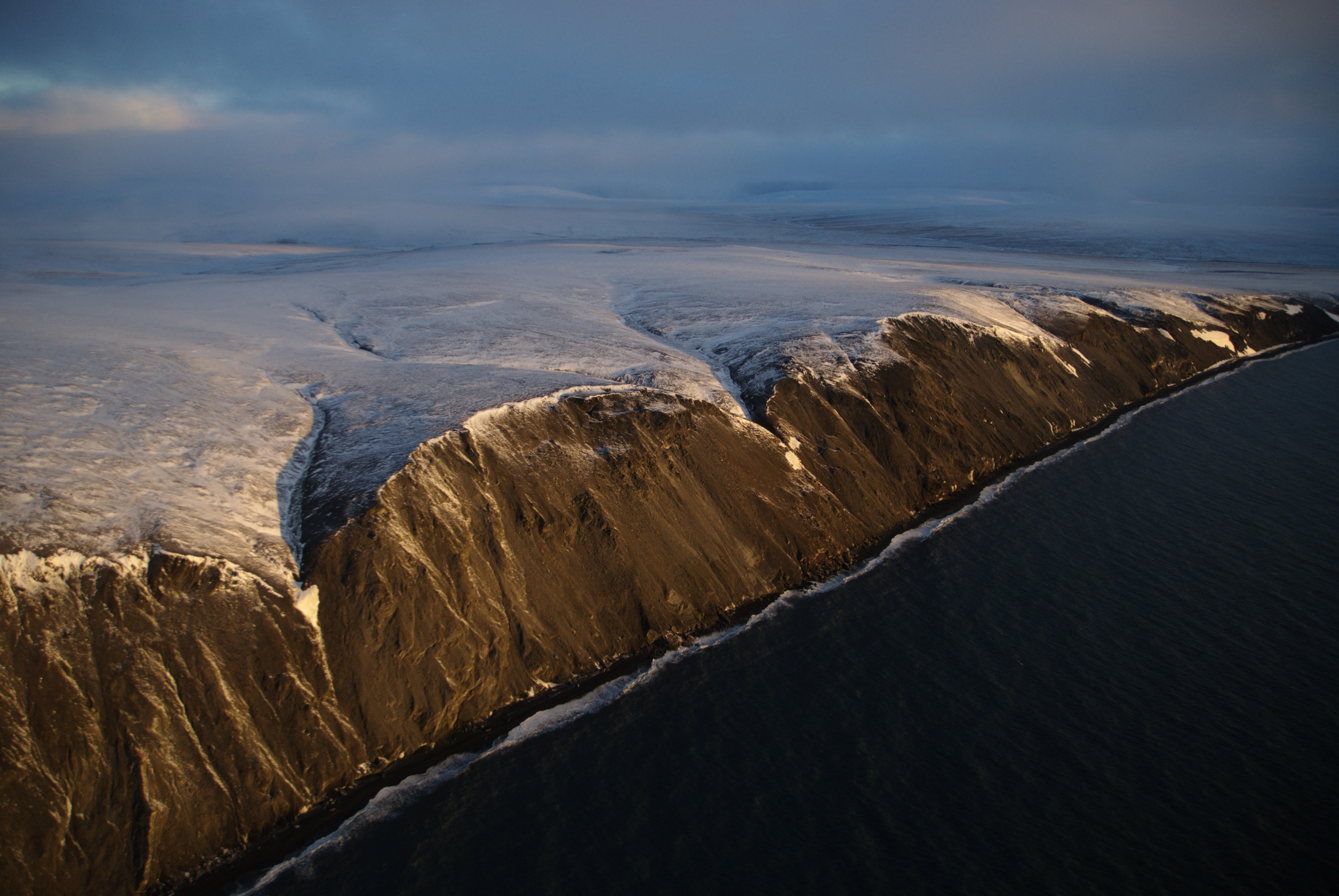

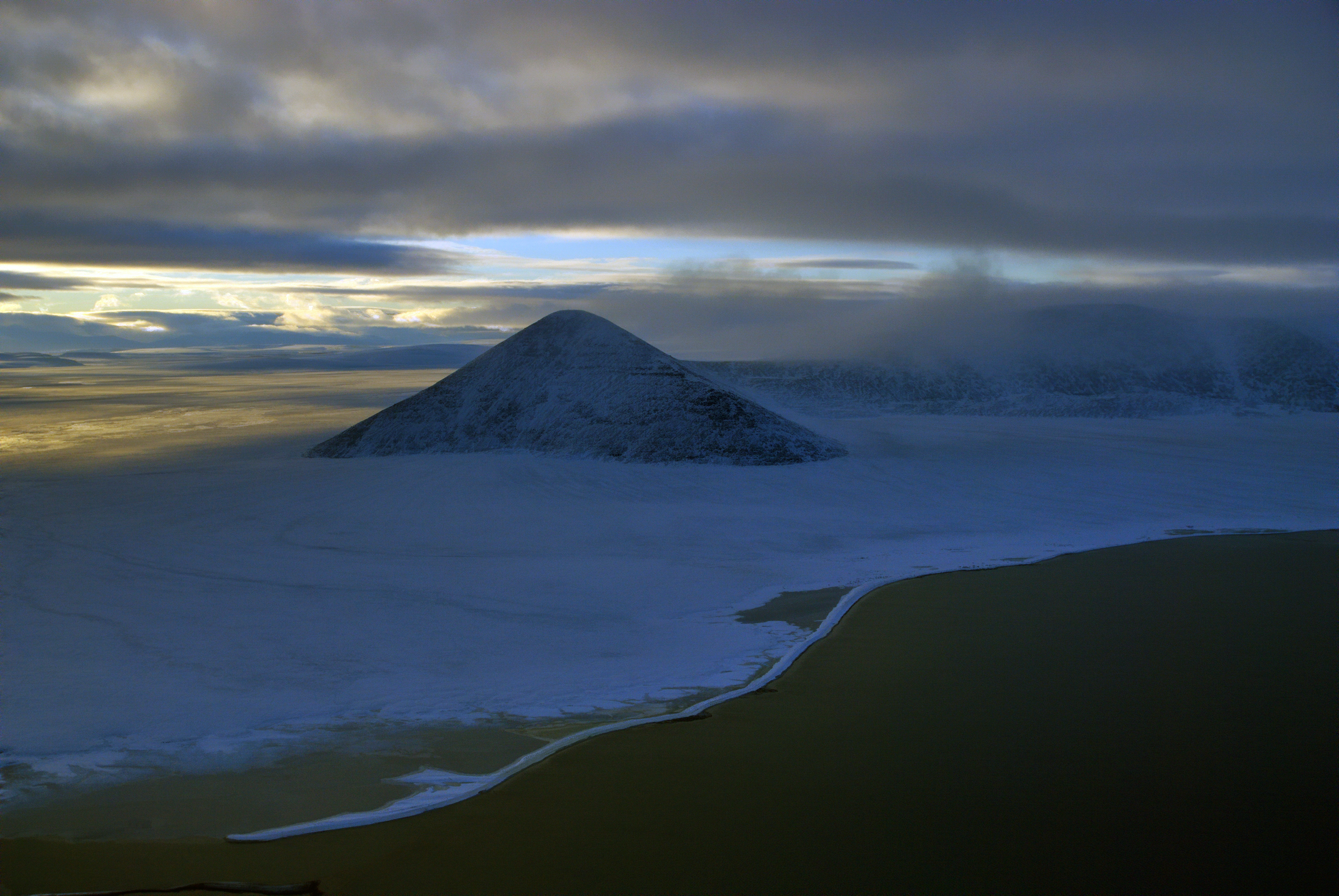

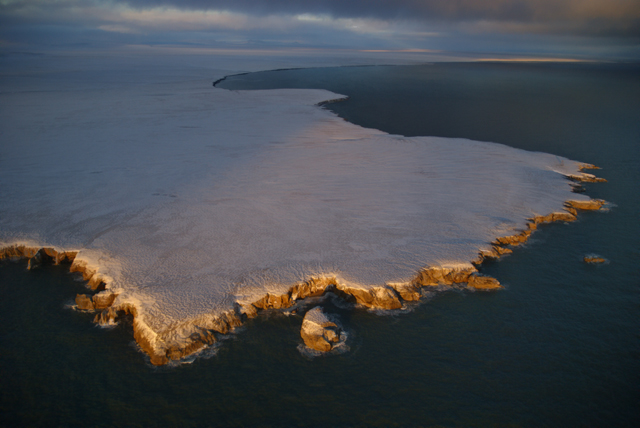

== Flora and fauna ==
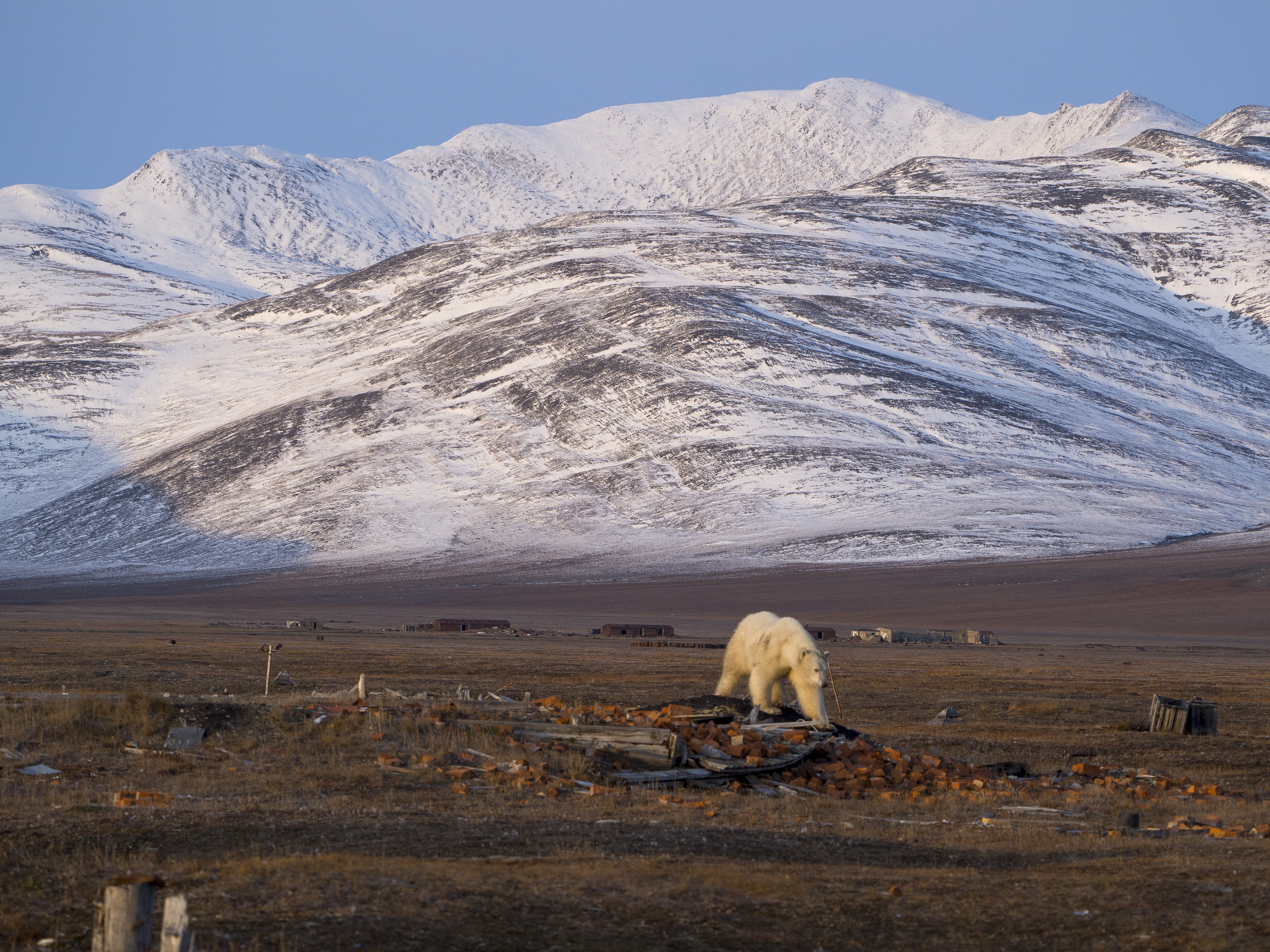
Polar bear on Wrangel Island

Wrangel Island is a breeding ground for polar bears having the highest density of dens in the world, bearded and ringed seals, walrus, as well as collared and west and east Siberian lemmings, which are a major food source for terrestrial carnivores, namely the Arctic foxes, wolverines and wolves which also inhabit the island. Cetaceans, such as Arctic bowhead whales, migratory gray whales and belugas can be seen close to shore.

Woolly mammoths survived on the island until around 2000 BC (4,000 years ago), the most recent survival of any known mammoth populations; for perspective, these mammoths were living during the times of ancient Bronze Age civilizations, post-dating the construction of the Great Sphinx and the Great Pyramid of Giza by several centuries. Mammoths, apparently, died out and subsequently disappeared from mainland Eurasia and North America around 10,000 years ago; however, about 500–1,000 mammoths were isolated on Wrangel Island and thus continued to survive for another 6,000 years.

Domestic reindeer were introduced in the 1950s, and their feral numbers are managed at around 1,000 in an effort to reduce their impact on nesting bird grounds. In 1975, musk oxen were also introduced, with a population that has grown from 20 to about 1,000. In 2002, wolves were spotted on the island; wolves had been present on the island in ancient times.

The flora of the island includes 417 species of plants, double that of any other Arctic tundra territory, of comparable size, and more than any other Arctic island. Thus, the island was proclaimed the northernmost World Heritage Site in 2004. Species and genera present include various Arctic-adapted types of Androsace, Artemisia, Astragalus, Carex, Cerastium, Draba, Erigeron, Oxytropis, Papaver, Pedicularis, Potentilla, Primula, Ranunculus, Rhodiola, Rumex, Salix, Saxifraga, Silene and Valeriana, among others.

=== Important Bird Area ===
Wrangel Island, along with nearby Herald Island, has been designated an Important Bird Area (IBA) by BirdLife International as it supports breeding colonies of many species of birds, including geese such as brant, cackling, greater white-fronted, Ross' and snow geese, and snowy owls—another Arctic predator attracted by the island's lemmings (which the owls can hear tunneling beneath the snow, catching the rodents with adept proficiency). Several gull species are present, including glaucous, Ross', Sabine's and ivory gulls, long-tailed, pomarine and parasitic jaegers, and black-legged kittiwakes, as well as many other sea and shorebird species, such as common and king eiders, horned puffins, pelagic cormorants, long-tailed ducks, red phalarope, dunlin, pectoral sandpipers, ruddy turnstones, red knots, black-bellied plovers, thick-billed murres and black guillemots. Passerine birds, though few, include Arctic warblers, Lapland longspurs and snow buntings. Wrangel Island is possibly the furthest-north that a sandhill crane has been observed, in 2014.

== Climate ==
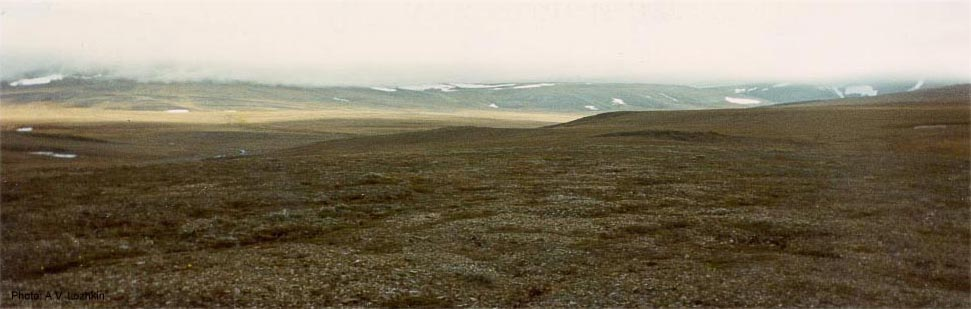
Arctic tundra on Wrangel Island

Wrangel Island has a severe polar climate (Köppen ET). The region is blanketed by dry and cold Arctic air masses for most of the year. Warmer and more humid air can reach the island from the south-east during summer. Dry and heated air from Siberia comes to the island periodically.

Wrangel Island is influenced by both the Arctic and Pacific air masses. One consequence is the predominance of high winds. The island is subjected to "cyclonic" episodes characterized by rapid circular winds. It is also an island of mists and fogs.

Winters are prolonged and are characterized by steady frosty weather and high northerly winds. During this period, the temperatures usually stay well below freezing for months. In February and March there are frequent snow-storms with wind speeds of 40 m/s (140 km/h; 89 mph) or above.

There are noticeable differences in climate between the northern, central and southern parts of the island. The central and southern portions are warmer, with some of their valleys having semi-continental climates that support a number of sub-Arctic steppe-like meadow species. This area has been described as perhaps being a relict of the Ice Age mammoth steppe, along with certain areas along the northwestern border between Mongolia and Russia.

The short summers are cool but comparatively mild as the polar day generally keeps temperatures above 0 °C (32 °F). Some frosts and snowfalls occur, and fog is common. Warmer and drier weather is experienced in the center of the island because the interior's topography encourages foehn winds. As of 2003, the frost-free period on the island was very short, usually not more than 20 to 25 days, and more often only two weeks. Average relative humidity is about 83%.

Climate data for Wrangel Island
Month	Jan	Feb	Mar	Apr	May	Jun	Jul	Aug	Sep	Oct	Nov	Dec	Year
Record high °C (°F)	1.5 (34.7)	−0.2 (31.6)	0.2 (32.4)	2.5 (36.5)	9.6 (49.3)	17.6 (63.7)	18.2 (64.8)	16.7 (62.1)	12.7 (54.9)	9.3 (48.7)	2.4 (36.3)	2.1 (35.8)	18.2 (64.8)
Mean daily maximum °C (°F)	−18.5 (−1.3)	−18.7 (−1.7)	−17.4 (0.7)	−11.7 (10.9)	−2.5 (27.5)	3.8 (38.8)	6.5 (43.7)	5.6 (42.1)	2.8 (37.0)	−2.4 (27.7)	−8.4 (16.9)	−15.5 (4.1)	−6.4 (20.5)
Daily mean °C (°F)	−21.8 (−7.2)	−22.2 (−8.0)	−21.0 (−5.8)	−15.2 (4.6)	−5.1 (22.8)	1.2 (34.2)	3.6 (38.5)	3.2 (37.8)	1.0 (33.8)	−4.2 (24.4)	−10.8 (12.6)	−18.2 (−0.8)	−9.1 (15.6)
Mean daily minimum °C (°F)	−25.1 (−13.2)	−25.7 (−14.3)	−24.5 (−12.1)	−18.8 (−1.8)	−7.5 (18.5)	−0.7 (30.7)	1.4 (34.5)	1.4 (34.5)	−0.7 (30.7)	−6.3 (20.7)	−13.5 (7.7)	−21.0 (−5.8)	−11.7 (10.8)
Record low °C (°F)	−42.0 (−43.6)	−44.6 (−48.3)	−45.0 (−49.0)	−38.2 (−36.8)	−31.5 (−24.7)	−12.3 (9.9)	−4.9 (23.2)	−6.5 (20.3)	−14.6 (5.7)	−29.8 (−21.6)	−34.9 (−30.8)	−57.7 (−71.9)	−57.7 (−71.9)
Average precipitation mm (inches)	9.1 (0.36)	10.2 (0.40)	7.6 (0.30)	6.7 (0.26)	7.9 (0.31)	9.3 (0.37)	21.5 (0.85)	22.3 (0.88)	16.3 (0.64)	16.1 (0.63)	11.5 (0.45)	9.4 (0.37)	147.9 (5.82)
Average rainy days	0.1	0.2	0.03	0.3	4	9	14	17	11	2	1	0.2	59
Average snowy days	13	13	12	14	17	9	3	6	15	22	16	13	153
Average relative humidity (%)	79	80	80	81	85	87	88	89	86	81	79	79	83
Mean monthly sunshine hours	2	59	195	267	199	233	226	125	73	50	4	0	1,433
Source 1: Климат о. Врангеля
Source 2: NOAA (sun 1961–1990)

== Waters on and around Wrangel ==
According to a 2003 report prepared by the Wrangel Island Nature Preserve, the hydrographic network of Wrangel Island consists of approximately 1,400 rivers over 1 km (0.62 mi) in length; five rivers over 50 kilometres (31.07 mi) long; and approximately 900 shallow lakes, mostly located in the northern portion of Wrangel Island, with a total surface area of 80 km^{2} (31 sq mi). The waters of the East Siberian Sea and the Sea of Chukchi surrounding Wrangel and Herald Islands are classified as a separate chemical oceanographic region. These waters have among the lowest levels of salinity in the Arctic basin as well as a very high oxygen content and increased biogenic elements.

== History ==
=== Extinction of the woolly mammoth and first human presence ===
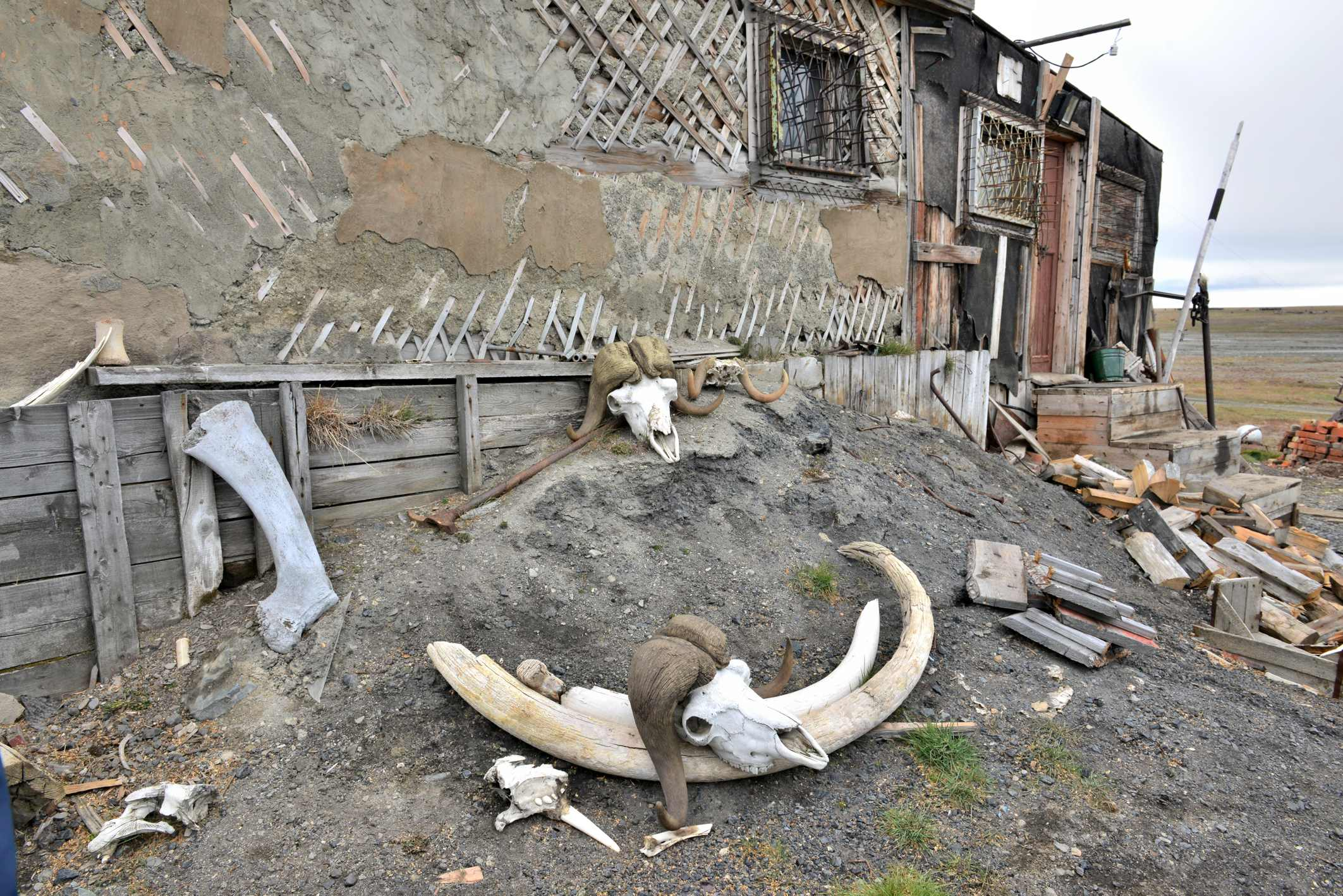
Woolly mammoth and muskox remains displayed on Wrangel Island, where mammoths survived until 4,000 years ago

Wrangel Island is generally accepted to be the final place on Earth to support an isolated population of woolly mammoths until their extinction about 2000 BC, based on directly radiocarbon dated woolly mammoth bones found on the island. Some authors have suggested that woolly mammoths survived until around the same time on the Taymyr Peninsula of mainland Siberia based on preserved environmental DNA, but the evidence in support of this claim has been questioned, as it has been demonstrated that environmental DNA in permafrost can be reworked into sediments that clearly post-date the extinction of the species in question.

Initially, it was assumed that this was a specific insular dwarf variant of the species originating from Siberia. However, after further evaluation, while their body size is relatively small, it falls within the size range known for woolly mammoths in mainland Siberia, and thus these Wrangel Island mammoths are no longer considered to have been true dwarves (though true dwarf mammoths and other dwarf elephants are known from other islands, some considerably smaller than Wrangel Island mammoths).

Research published in 2017 suggested that the mammoth population was experiencing a genetic meltdown in the DNA of the last animals, a difference when compared with examples about 40,000 years earlier, when populations were plentiful. The research suggests the signature of a genomic meltdown in small populations, consistent with nearly neutral genome evolution. It also suggests large numbers of detrimental variants collecting in pre-extinction genomes, a warning for continued efforts to protect current endangered species with small population sizes. However, this conclusion regarding the mammoth population was disputed by a later study published in 2024, who found that many of the most deleterious mutations had been purged from the genome, and instead suggested that the extinction was likely due to a catastrophic event, and that the woolly mammoths were already extinct for several centuries prior to the earliest human presence on the island.

The earliest evidence of humans (and the only known pre-modern archaeological site on the island) is Chertov Ovrag on the southern coast, a Paleoeskimo short-term hunting camp which dates to around 3,600 years ago. At the camp remains of birds (including the remains of at least 32 snow goose, six long-tailed duck, and one individual each of common murre and snow bunting), as well as two seals (including one bearded seal), a walrus and a polar bear were found in association with stone tools, as well as a toggling harpoon head made of walrus tusk. The tools show cultural similarities to other contemporaneous Paleoeskimo sites in Alaska.

A legend prevalent among the Chukchi people of Siberia tells of a chief Krachai (or Krächoj, Krahay, Khrakhai), who fled with his people (the Krachaians or Krahays, also identified as the Onkilon or Omoki – Siberian Yupik people) across the ice to settle in a northern land. Though the story may be mythical, the existence of an island or continent to the north was lent credence by the annual migration of reindeer across the ice, as well as the appearance of slate spear-points washed up on Arctic shores, made in a fashion unknown to the Chukchi. Retired University of Alaska Fairbanks linguistics professor Michael E. Krauss presented archaeological, historical, and linguistic evidence that Wrangel Island was a way station on a trade route linking the Inuit settlement at Point Hope, Alaska with the north Siberian coast, and that the coast was colonized in late prehistoric and early historic times by Inuit settlers from North America. Krauss suggested that the departure of these colonists was related to the Krachai legend.

=== Outside discovery ===
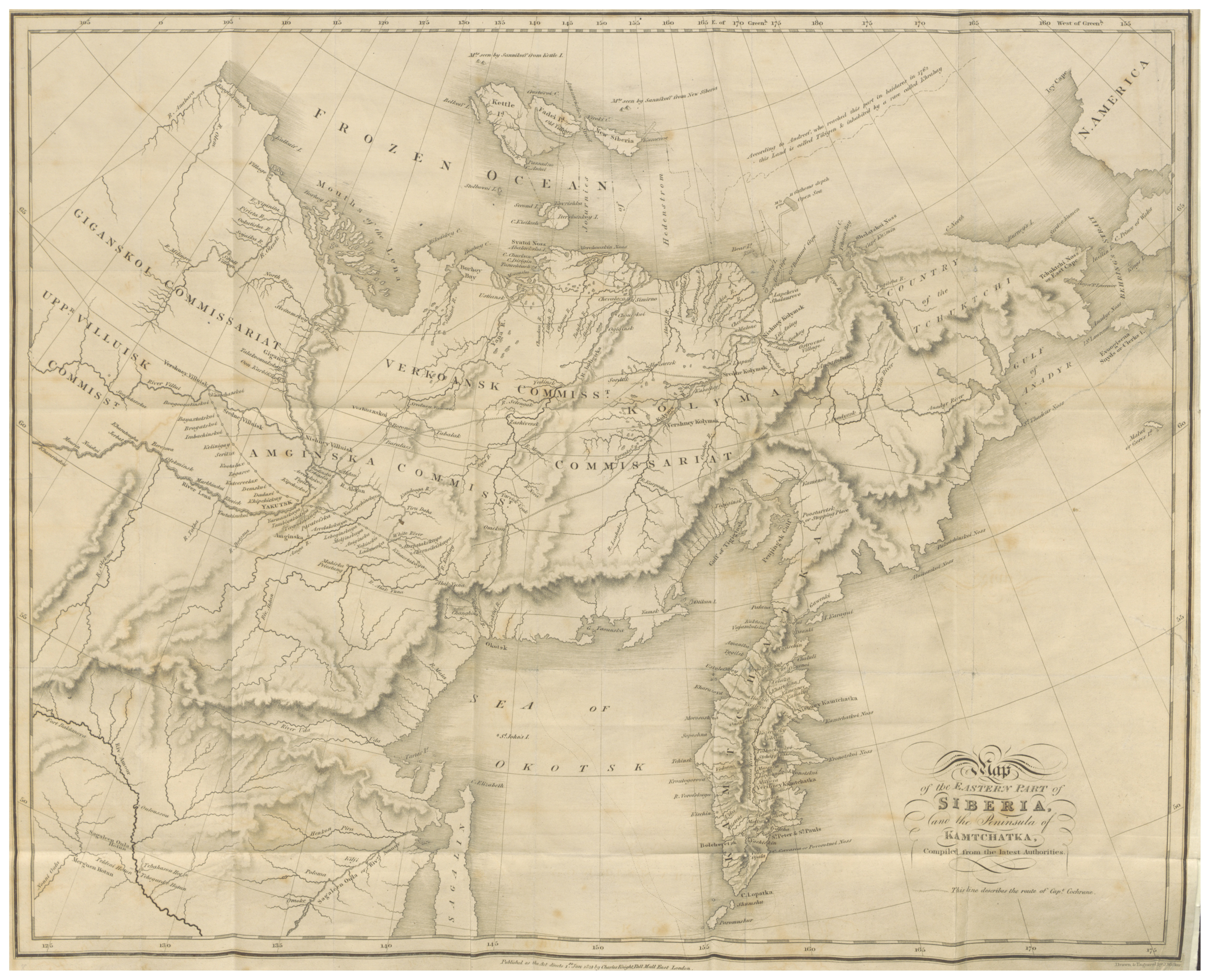
Map of Eastern Siberia with "Tikigen" Land (1825)

In 1764, the Cossack Sergeant Stepan Andreyev claimed to have sighted this island. The report of his expedition noted native accounts that it was called Tikegen and inhabited by a people called the Krahay. Eventually, the island was named after Baron Ferdinand von Wrangel, who, after reading Andreyev's report and hearing Chukchi stories of land at the island's coordinates, set off on an expedition (1820–1824) to discover the island, with no success. Wrangel, observing that Andreyev's accounts could be unreliable, suggested Andreyev must have sighted part of the mainland of Asia.

=== British, American, and Russian expeditions ===
In 1849, Henry Kellett, captain of HMS Herald, landed on and named Herald Island. He erroneously thought he saw another island to the west, which he called Plover Island; thereafter it was indicated on British admiralty charts as Kellett Land.

Eduard Dallmann, a German whaler, reported in 1881 that he had landed on the island in 1866.

Sketch of Wrangel Island as it appeared from the top of Herald Island, 1881

In August 1867, Thomas Long, an American whaling captain, "approached it as near as fifteen miles. I have named this northern land Wrangell [sic] Land ... as an appropriate tribute to the memory of a man who spent three consecutive years north of latitude 68°, and demonstrated the problem of this open polar sea forty-five years ago, although others of much later date have endeavored to claim the merit of this discovery." An account appeared in the Proceedings of the American Association for the Advancement of Science, 1868 (17th Meeting, at Chicago), published in 1869, under the title "The New Arctic Continent, or Wrangell's Land, discovered 14 August 1867, by Captain Long, of the American Ship Nile, and seen by Captains Raynor, Bliven and others, with a brief Notice of Baron Wrangell's Exploration in 1823".

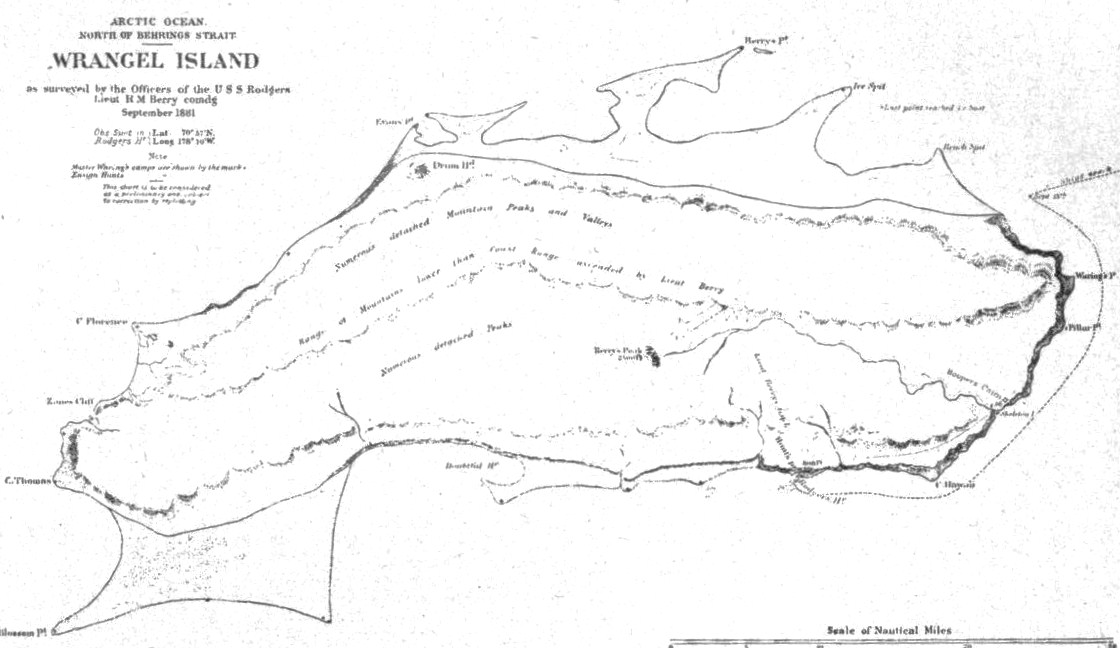
Map of Wrangel Island produced by the USS Rodgers Survey, as reproduced in John Muir's Cruise of the Corwin

George W. De Long, commanding USS Jeannette, led an expedition in 1879 attempting to reach the North Pole, expecting to go by the "east side of Kellett land", which he thought extended far into the Arctic. His ship became locked in the polar ice pack and drifted westward, passing within sight of Wrangel before being crushed and sunk in the vicinity of the New Siberian Islands which ultimately resulted in the death of 12 men, including himself .

A party from the USRC Corwin landed on Wrangel Island on 12 August 1881, claimed the island for the United States and named it "New Columbia". The expedition, under the command of Calvin L. Hooper, was seeking the Jeannette and two missing whalers in addition to conducting general exploration. It included naturalist John Muir, who published the first description of Wrangel Island. In the same year on 23 August, the USS Rodgers, commanded by Lieutenant R. M. Berry during the second search for the Jeannette, landed a party on Wrangel Island which stayed about two weeks and conducted an extensive survey of the southern coast.

In 1911, the Russian Arctic Ocean Hydrographic Expedition on icebreakers Vaygach and Taymyr under Boris Vilkitsky, landed on the island. In 1916 the Tsarist government declared that the island belonged to the Russian Empire.

=== Stefansson expeditions ===
In 1914, members of the Canadian Arctic Expedition, organized by Vilhjalmur Stefansson, were marooned on Wrangel Island for nine months after their ship, Karluk, was crushed in the ice pack. The survivors were rescued by the American motorized fishing schooner King & Winge after Captain Robert Bartlett walked across the Chukchi Sea to Siberia to summon help.

In 1921, Stefansson sent five settlers (the Canadian Allan Crawford, three Americans: Fred Maurer, Lorne Knight and Milton Galle, and Iñupiat seamstress and cook Ada Blackjack) to the island in a speculative attempt to claim it for Canada. The explorers were handpicked by Stefansson based upon their previous experience and academic credentials. Stefansson considered those with advanced knowledge in the fields of geography and science for this expedition. At the time, Stefansson claimed that his purpose was to head off a possible Japanese claim. An attempt to relieve this group in 1922 failed when the schooner Teddy Bear under Captain Joe Bernard became stuck in the ice. In 1923, the sole survivor of the Wrangel Island expedition, Ada Blackjack, was rescued by a ship that left another party of 13 (American Charles Wells and 12 Inuit).

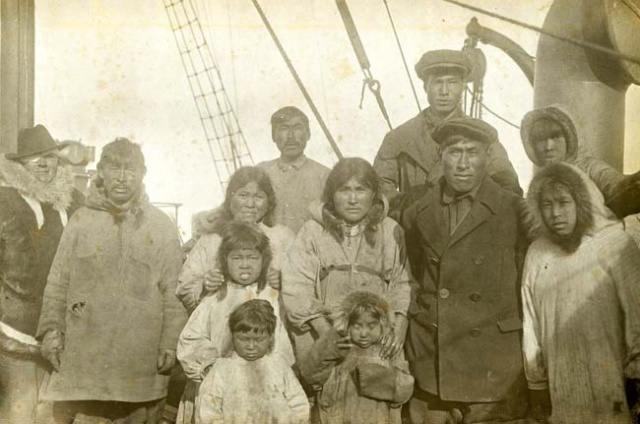
Wrangel Island Inuit inhabitants on board Krasnyy Oktyabr, 1924

In 1924, the Soviet Union removed the American and 13 Inuit (one was born on the island) of this settlement aboard the Krasny Oktyabr (Red October). Wells subsequently died of pneumonia in Vladivostok during a diplomatic American-Soviet row about an American boundary marker on the Siberian coast, and an Inuk child died of tuberculosis. The others were deported from Vladivostok to the Chinese border post Suifenhe, but the Chinese government did not want to accept them as the American consul in Harbin told them the Inuit were not American citizens. Later, the American government came up with a statement that the Inuit were 'wards' of the United States, but that there were no funds for returning them. Another child died while they were detained in Manchuria. Eventually, the American Red Cross came up with $1,600 for their return. They left China from Harbin, retrieved by a Japanese ship, and sailed to Victoria and Seattle before returning to Nome.

During the Soviet trip, the American reindeer owner Carl J. Lomen from Nome had taken over the possessions of Stefansson and had acquired explicit support ("go and hold it") from US Secretary of State Charles Evans Hughes to claim the island for the United States, a goal about which the Russian expedition got to hear during their trip. Lomen dispatched the MS Herman, commanded by captain Louis L. Lane. Due to unfavorable ice conditions, the Herman could not get any further than Herald Island, where the American flag was raised.

In 1926, the government of the Soviet Union reaffirmed the Tsarist claim to sovereignty over Wrangel Island.

=== Soviet administration ===
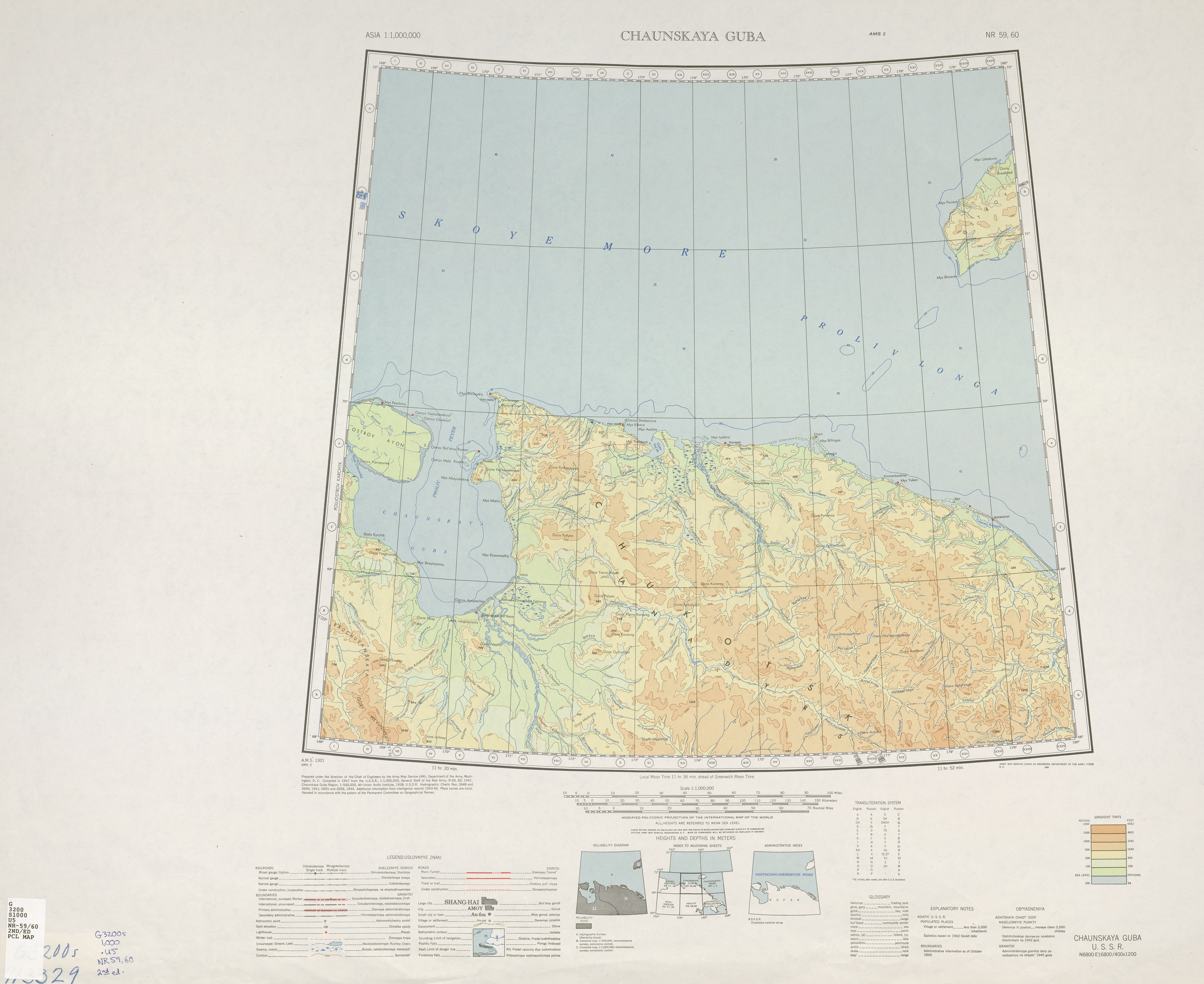

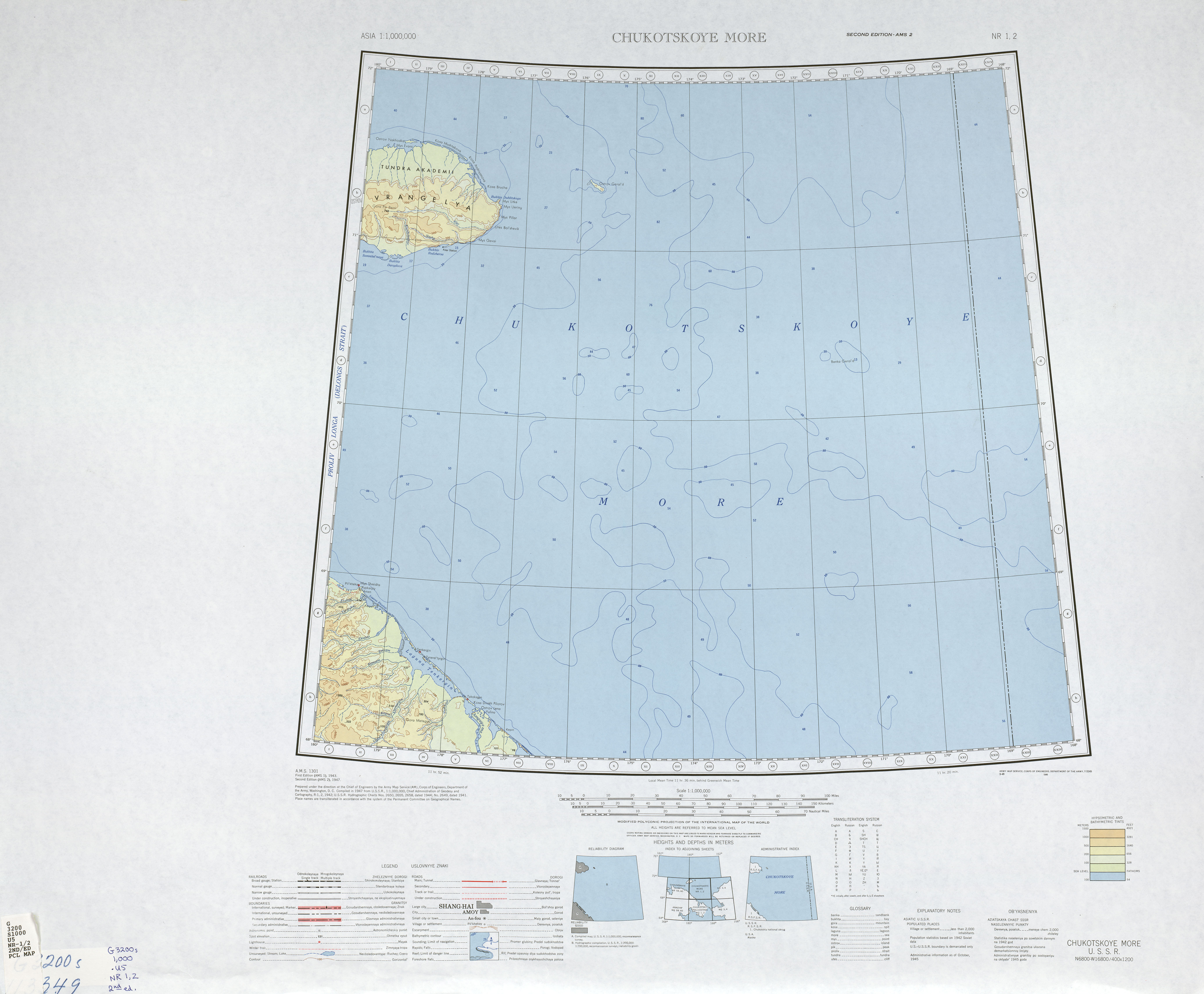

In 1926, a team of Soviet explorers, equipped with three years of supplies, landed on Wrangel Island. Clear waters that facilitated the 1926 landing were followed by years of continuous heavy ice surrounding the island. Attempts to reach the island by sea failed, and it was feared that the team would not survive their fourth winter.

In 1929, the icebreaker Fyodor Litke was chosen for a rescue operation. It sailed from Sevastopol, commanded by captain Konstantin Dublitsky. On 4 July, it reached Vladivostok where all Black Sea sailors were replaced by local crew members. Ten days later Litke sailed north; it passed the Bering Strait, and tried to pass Long Strait and approach the island from south. On 8 August a scout plane reported impassable ice in the strait, and Litke turned north, heading to Herald Island. It failed to escape mounting ice; on August 12 the captain shut down the engines to save coal and had to wait two weeks until the ice pressure eased. Making a few hundred meters a day, Litke reached the settlement August 28. On September 5, Litke turned back, taking all the 'islanders' to safety. This operation earned Litke the order of the Red Banner of Labour (January 20, 1930), as well as commemorative badges for the crew.

According to a 1936 article in Time magazine, Wrangel Island became the scene of a bizarre criminal story in the 1930s when it fell under the increasingly arbitrary rule of its appointed governor Konstantin Semenchuk. Semenchuk controlled the local populace and his own staff through open extortion and murder. He forbade the local Yupik Eskimos (recruited from Provideniya Bay in 1926) to hunt walrus, which put them in danger of starvation, while collecting food for himself. He was then implicated in the mysterious deaths of some of his opponents, including the local doctor. Allegedly, he ordered his subordinate, the sledge driver Stepan Startsev, to murder Nikolai Vulfson, who had attempted to stand up to Semenchuk, on 27 December 1934 (though there were also rumours that Startsev had fallen in love with Vulfson's wife, Gita Feldman, and killed him out of jealousy). The subsequent trial in May–June 1936, at the Supreme Court of the RSFSR, sentenced Semenchuk and Startsev to death for "banditry" and violation of Soviet law, and "the most publicised result of the trial was the joy of the liberated Eskimos". This trial had the result of launching the career of the prosecutor, Andrey Vyshinsky, who called the two defendants "human waste" and who would soon achieve great notoriety in the Moscow Trials.

In 1948, a small herd of domestic reindeer was introduced with the intention of establishing commercial herding to generate income for island residents.

Aside from the main settlement of Ushakovskoye near Rogers Bay, on the south-central coast, in the 1960s a new settlement named Zvyozdny was established 38 km (24 mi) to the west in the Somnitelnaya Bay area, where ground runways reserved for military aviation were constructed (these were abandoned in the 1970s). Moreover, a military radar installation was built on the southeast coast at Cape Hawaii. Rock crystal mining had been carried out for a number of years in the center of the island near Khrustalnyi Creek. At the time, a small settlement, Perkatkun, had been established nearby to house the miners, but later on it was completely destroyed.

=== Establishment of Federal Nature Reserve ===
Resolution #189 of the Council of Ministers of the Russian Soviet Federative Socialist Republic (RSFSR) was adopted on 23 March 1976, for the establishment of the state Nature Reserve "Wrangel Island" for the purpose of conserving the unique natural systems of Wrangel and Herald Islands and the surrounding waters out to 5 nmi (9 km). On 15 December 1997, the Russian Government's Decree No. 1623-r expanded the marine reserve out to 12 nmi (22 km). On 25 May 1999, the (regional) Governor of Chukotka issued Decree No. 91, which again expanded the protected water area to 24 nmi (44 km) around Wrangel and Herald Islands.

By the 1980s, the reindeer-herding farm on Wrangel had been abolished and the settlement of Zvezdnyi was virtually abandoned. Hunting had already been stopped, except for a small quota of marine mammals for the needs of the local population. In 1992, the military radar installation at Cape Hawaii (on the southeast coast) was closed, and only the settlement of Ushakovskoye remained occupied.

=== Post-Soviet era ===
According to some American activists and government officials, at least eight Arctic islands currently controlled by Russia, including Wrangel Island, are claimed or should be claimed by the United States. However, according to the United States Department of State no such claim exists. The USSR–USA Maritime Boundary Agreement, which has yet to be approved by the Russian Duma, does not specifically address the status of these islands nor the maritime boundaries associated with them.

On 1 June 1990, US Secretary of State James Baker signed an executive agreement with Eduard Shevardnadze, the Soviet foreign minister. It specified that even though the treaty had not been ratified, the U.S. and the USSR agreed to abide by the terms of the treaty beginning 15 June 1990. The Senate ratified the USSR–USA Maritime Boundary Agreement in 1991, which was then signed by US President George H. W. Bush.

In 2004, Wrangel Island and neighboring Herald Island, along with their surrounding waters, were added to UNESCO's World Heritage List.

=== Russian naval base ===
In 2014, the Russian Navy announced plans to establish a base on the island. The bases on Wrangel Island and on Cape Schmidt on Russia's Arctic coast reportedly consist of two sets of 34 prefabricated modules.

== In literature ==
In Jules Verne's novel César Cascabel, the protagonists float past Wrangel Island on an iceberg. In Verne's description, a live volcano is located on the island: "Between the two capes on its southern coast, Cape Hawan and Cape Thomas, it is surmounted by a live volcano, which is marked on the recent maps." In Chukchi author Yuri Rytkheu's historical novel A Dream in Polar Fog, set in the early 20th century, the Chukchi knew of Wrangel Island and referred to it as the "Invisible Land" or "Invisible Island".

The title poem of Craig Finlay's 2021 collection The Very Small Mammoths of Wrangel Island describes the last few wooly mammoths living there.

== See also ==
- Russian Arctic islands
- List of islands of Russia
- List of nature reserves in Russia
- World Heritage Sites in Russia
