= Ushakovskoye, Chukotka Autonomous Okrug =

Selo in Shmidtovsky District, Chukotka Autonomous Okrug, Russia

Ushakovskoye Ушаковское
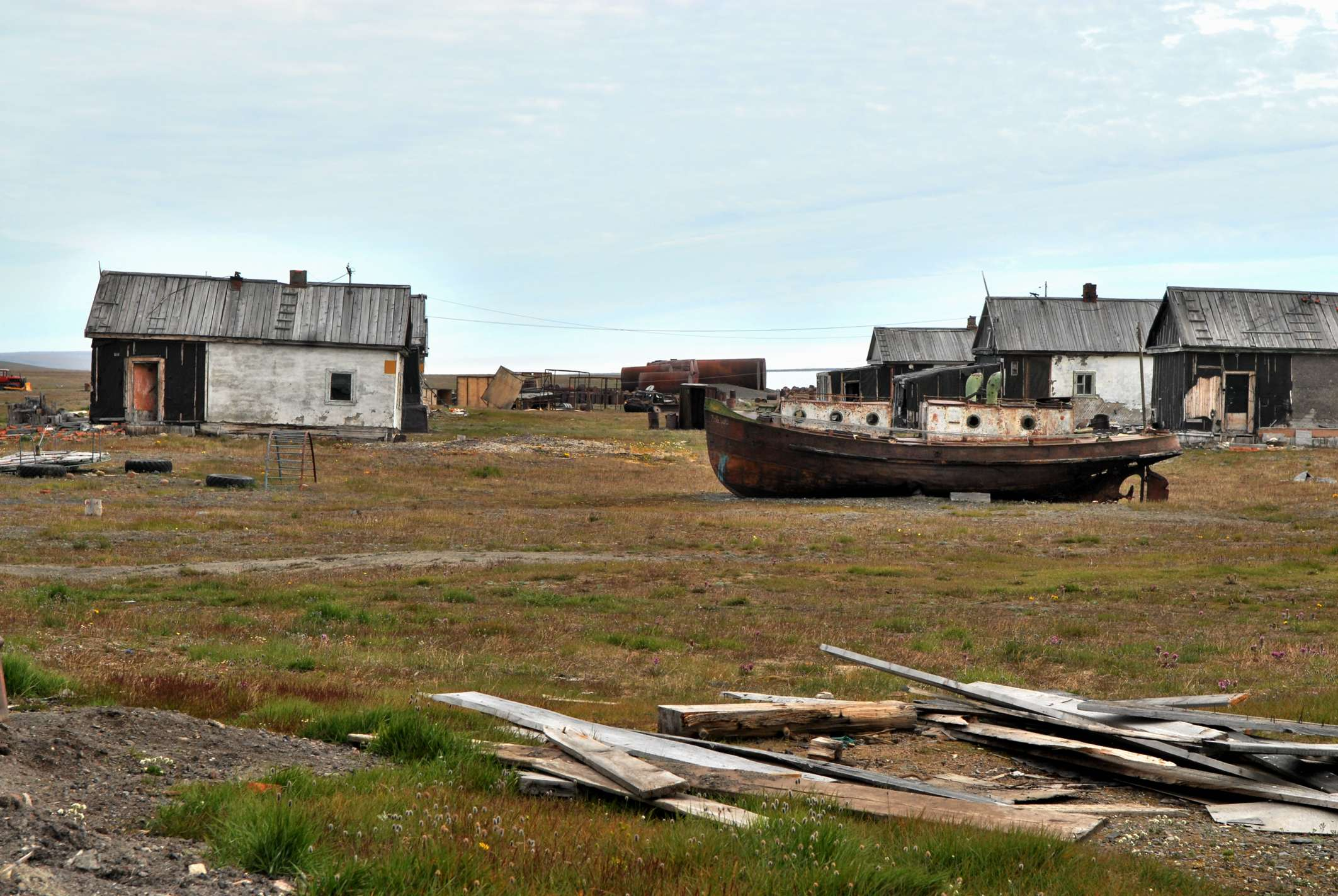
- Interactive map of Ushakovskoye
- Location of Ushakovskoye Ushakovskoye (Chukotka Autonomous Okrug)
- Coordinates: 70°58′51″N 178°29′27″W
- Country: Russia
- Federal subject: Chukotka Autonomous Okrug
- Founded: 1926

Population
  - Estimate (2002): 0 )
- Time zone: UTC+12 (MSK+9)
- OKTMO ID: 77715000131

Ushakovskoye (Russian: Ушаковское) was a rural locality (a selo) on the south east coast of Wrangel Island, Shmidtovsky District in the Russian Arctic that was deserted in 2003. Ushakovskoye was named after the explorer and founder of the polar station in Rogers Bay, Georgy Ushakov, who discovered a number of new islands in the Russian arctic. The settlement was founded as part of an attempt by Russia to assert sovereignty over the island following attempts by British and Canadian parties to claim the island and in 1935 was the scene of a grisly murder committed by the local governor. The whole area experiences a severe, almost year-round arctic climate, with temperatures rarely above freezing.

== History ==
=== Early settlement ===
Although Ushakovskoye was to become the main settlement on the island, it was not the first time that attempts had been made to settle the island. From the late 19th century, Canada and the United States were interested in Wrangel Island, and both attempted to claim the island, despite the fact that Russia had claimed it in 1911. During the Russian Civil War, the countries intensified their efforts.

In 1921, an expedition financed by Vilhjalmur Stefansson and led by Canadian Allan Crawford attempted to settle a small party to claim the island for Canada, on behalf of Great Britain, with Stefansson stating that, "We want to have Wrangel Island for the development of [British] air routes, so that it will be the home base for airships and airplanes in the same way as the Falkland Islands provide a base for our ships and cruisers". However, conditions were not favourable, with a lack of hunting available once the expedition members ran out of rations forcing the majority of the party to flee across the Chukchi Sea, leaving party member Ada Blackjack as a castaway on the island for two years.

In 1922, the Canadian Prime Minister, William Lyon Mackenzie King officially announced the Canadian claim that Wrangel Island was British territory. In 1923, in the Bay of Rogers, an American expedition landed to claim the island.

=== Russian settlement ===
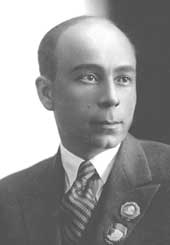
Georgy Ushakov, the Arctic explorer after whom the settlement was named.

In response, in 1924, the Soviet Union sent the gunboat Red October; the crew stopped the activities of American firms and Stefensson, declaring the island to be Soviet territory. The Soviet Government, in 1926, declared its sovereignty over the island; and, to confirm this, Ushakovskoye was founded by Georgy Ushakov's expedition on August 14, 1926. Ushakov had stopped off in Provideniya Bay and had brought with him several Inuit families from the village of Ureliki.

The initial population of the settlement included Chukchi and Russian families, totalling about 60 people In 1928, the first child, PI Pavlov, was born in the village. During the first three years, a hydrometeorological station was established on the island. The settlers established themselves on the island and few chose to return to the mainland after their first posting ended in 1929. Indeed, so successful was the initial settlement that resulted in the founding of Ushakovskoye, that a second village, Zvyozdny, literally, Star, was founded some 30 km west of Ushakovskoye on the shores of Somnitelnaya Bay. Zvyozdny would later become linked with the Russian airbase at Cape Hawaii and would become the landing point for supplies delivered to the island from Mys Shmidta as well as mail, which would be delivered to Ushakovskoye along the dirt track which links the two settlements.

=== Murder ===
The establishment of the Russian claim and the settlement was also not without its troubles when, in September 1934, a new governor, Konstantin Semenchuk, previously posted to Iran, took office to supervise the attempts by the Russians to turn the tundra into a vegetable garden for all Russia, allegedly announcing the commencement of his time in office by gathering the people of Ushakovskoye together and informing them that, "Up here I am everything. I have all the rights, up to shooting people!"

Due to the isolated nature of the settlement, it was only in the winter of 1935, over a year after Semenchuk's arrival, that suspicions were first aroused when Otto Schmidt received a communication from Semenchuk requesting additional medical assistance to deal with an outbreak of typhoid and scurvy, despite there having been no previous outbreaks of typhoid being reported in the Arctic. This radio message, swiftly followed by the news that hitherto loyal party member Mrs Wulfson, the doctor's wife, was being returned to the mainland as a result of counter-revolutionary activities, resulted in dispatching of a GPU agent to investigate.

The agent amassed a large quantity of evidence against Semenchuk including the murder of the doctor, rape of local Yupik women and assault against the local Yupik men and charges of banditry, a more serious charge simply than murder, were brought against Semenchuk. The case was deemed so important as an example to dissuade other rural governors from lapsing into autocracy that Chief Public Prosecutor André Vishinsky took personal charge of the trial and, despite allegedly presenting signs of insanity during the trial, Semenchuk was convicted and sentenced to death by firing squad.

=== Modern history ===
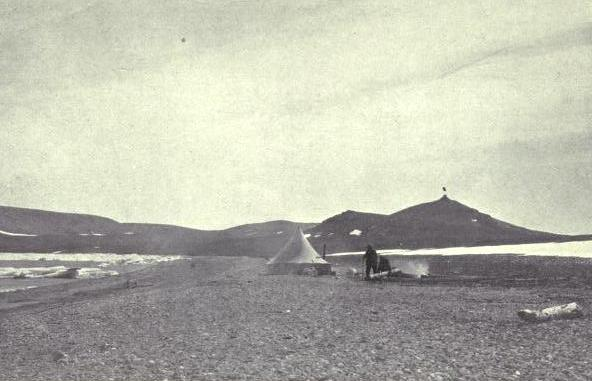
The camp of the 1914 Canadian expedition in Rodgers Bay at the site of the village.

The settlement grew and developed, until at the end of 1970 it had a school, club, shop, post office, hospital, helipad, a modest museum of natural history, an underground repository in the permafrost for storing meat, a temporary corral (for the slaughter of reindeer), the polar station "Rogers Bay" airport for An-2, Mi-2, Mi-6 and Mi-8 aircraft, fuel storage and bulk storage of coal, library and a communal bath. Electricity was supplied to the homes.

The airbase at Cape Hawaii closed in the 1970s and the settlement of Zvyozdny was abandoned, but for a handful of Chukchi hunters, in the 1980s.

In 1984, a monument to Georgy Ushakov was erected in the settlement by the Geographical Society of the USSR, and the population of the settlement had grown to around 180 people.

From the early 1990s, subsidies were reduced and in 1994 the last supply ship brought provisions and fuel to the settlement. Afterwards, cargo and mail were carried by helicopter. People began to leave Ushakovskoye and in 1997 it was decided to resettle the inhabitants at Mys Shmidta. The last resident of Ushakovskoye, Vasilina Alpaun, was killed by a polar bear on October 13, 2003, not far from her home.

However, Google Earth satellite imagery dated 21 July 2016, shows that in the preceding two years there had been considerable development of habitation and radar facilities to the east and north east of the village.

== Climate ==
With a tundra climate (Köppen climate classification ET), Ushakovskoye experiences harsh weather almost all year round, and with temperatures only struggling above freezing for a few brief summer months, with temperatures often below freezing from September all the way through to the following June.

Climate data for Ushakovskoye
| Month | Jan | Feb | Mar | Apr | May | Jun | Jul | Aug | Sep | Oct | Nov | Dec | Year |
|---|---|---|---|---|---|---|---|---|---|---|---|---|---|
| Record high °C (°F) | 1.5 (34.7) | −0.2 (31.6) | 0.2 (32.4) | 2.2 (36.0) | 9.6 (49.3) | 17.4 (63.3) | 18.2 (64.8) | 16.7 (62.1) | 11.9 (53.4) | 5.3 (41.5) | 1.8 (35.2) | 2.0 (35.6) | 18.2 (64.8) |
| Mean daily maximum °C (°F) | −19.3 (−2.7) | −21.0 (−5.8) | −19.3 (−2.7) | −13.1 (8.4) | −3.9 (25.0) | 3.1 (37.6) | 5.5 (41.9) | 4.7 (40.5) | 1.2 (34.2) | −5.0 (23.0) | −11.6 (11.1) | −17.8 (0.0) | −8.0 (17.5) |
| Daily mean °C (°F) | −23.0 (−9.4) | −24.7 (−12.5) | −23.2 (−9.8) | −17.0 (1.4) | −6.7 (19.9) | 0.6 (33.1) | 2.7 (36.9) | 2.3 (36.1) | −0.8 (30.6) | −7.2 (19.0) | −14.4 (6.1) | −21.0 (−5.8) | −11.0 (12.1) |
| Mean daily minimum °C (°F) | −26.7 (−16.1) | −28.4 (−19.1) | −27.1 (−16.8) | −20.9 (−5.6) | −9.5 (14.9) | −1.4 (29.5) | 0.7 (33.3) | 0.5 (32.9) | −2.6 (27.3) | −9.7 (14.5) | −17.5 (0.5) | −24.3 (−11.7) | −13.9 (7.0) |
| Record low °C (°F) | −42.0 (−43.6) | −44.6 (−48.3) | −45.0 (−49.0) | −38.2 (−36.8) | −31.5 (−24.7) | −12.3 (9.9) | −4.9 (23.2) | −6.5 (20.3) | −21.4 (−6.5) | −29.8 (−21.6) | −34.9 (−30.8) | −57.7 (−71.9) | −57.7 (−71.9) |
| Average precipitation mm (inches) | 12.5 (0.49) | 10.9 (0.43) | 8.7 (0.34) | 7.2 (0.28) | 8.1 (0.32) | 11.4 (0.45) | 23.3 (0.92) | 26.7 (1.05) | 19.9 (0.78) | 15.1 (0.59) | 13.6 (0.54) | 10.9 (0.43) | 168.3 (6.62) |
| Average precipitation days (≥ 0.1 mm) | 12.4 | 10.4 | 9.4 | 9.5 | 14.3 | 10.0 | 10.3 | 14.5 | 16.0 | 18.7 | 14.6 | 12.6 | 152.7 |
| Average relative humidity (%) | 77.9 | 80.1 | 80.2 | 81.6 | 84.6 | 87.1 | 86.8 | 89.3 | 87.2 | 81.7 | 78.7 | 79.6 | 82.9 |
| Mean monthly sunshine hours | 3.1 | 44.8 | 176.7 | 279.0 | 155.0 | 252.0 | 238.7 | 133.3 | 84.0 | 46.5 | 3.0 | 0.0 | 1,416.1 |
Source: climatebase.ru

== See also ==
- List of inhabited localities in Shmidtovsky District
- List of inhabited localities in Iultinsky District
