= Robert Mallory Berry =

American naval officer (1846–1929)

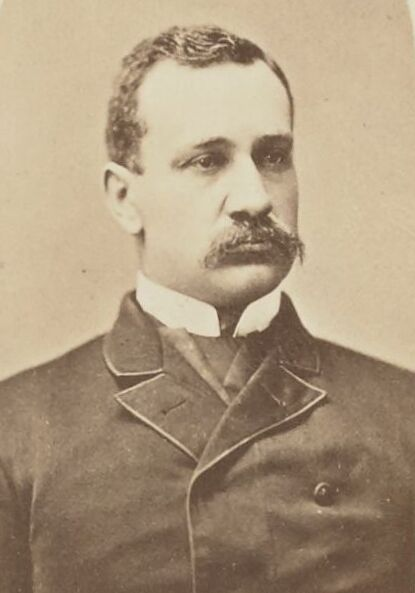
- Born: Robert M. Berry; January 28, 1846; Henry County, Kentucky, USA
- Died: May 19, 1929 (aged 83); Tryon, Polk County, North Carolina USA
- Military career
- Allegiance: United States of America
- Branch: United States Navy
- Service years: 1862–1908 (USN)

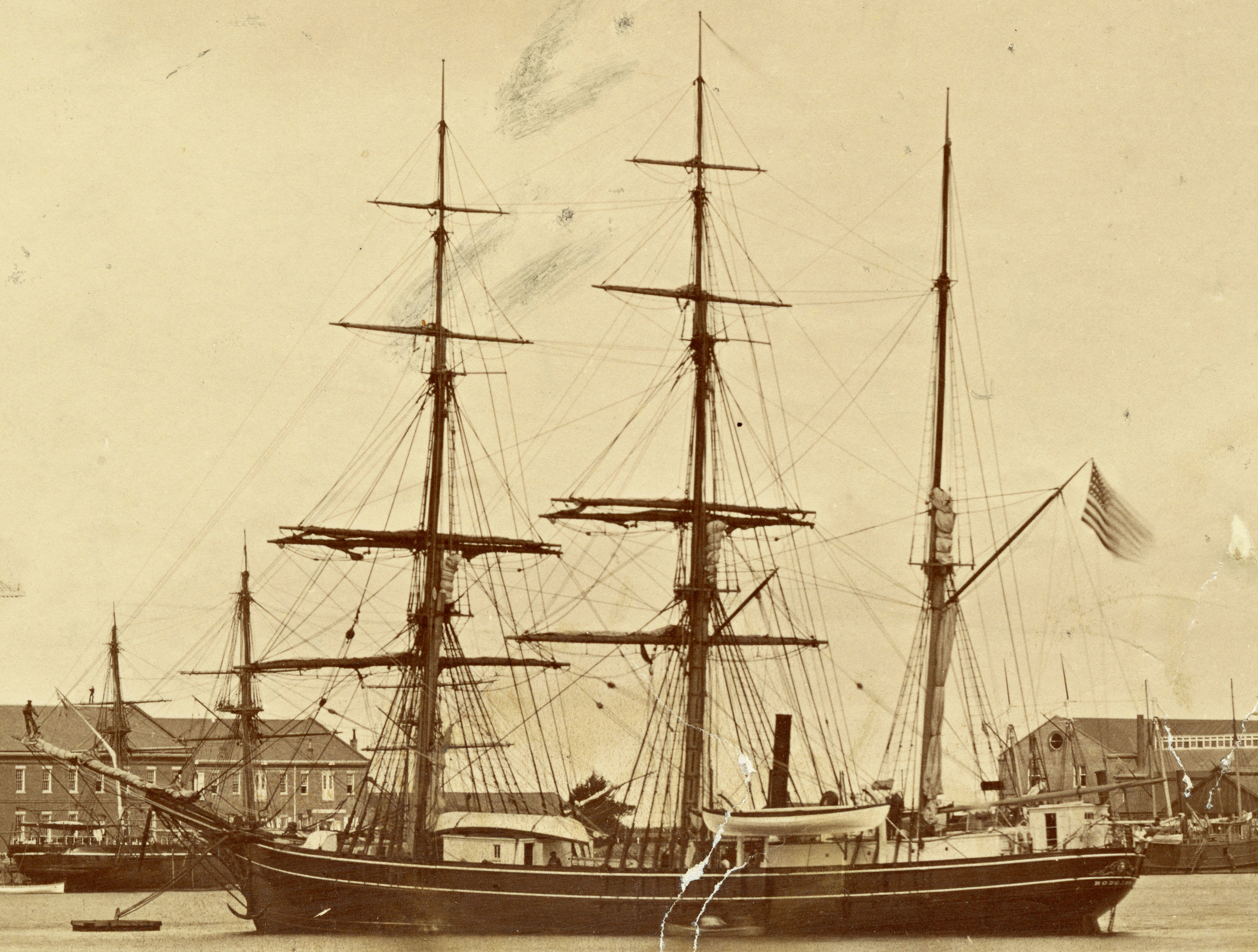
USS Rodgers, commanded by Lt. Robert M. Berry

Robert Mallory Berry (28 Jan 1846 – 19 May 1929) was an American naval officer and Arctic explorer.

== Biography ==
Berry began his naval career attending the United States Naval Academy from January 1862 until June 1866.

=== Search for the Jeannette ===
In May 1881, Berry became commander of USS Rodgers, a ship built for Arctic navigation. He was part of the second relief effort of the ill-fated Jeannette expedition. The ship left San Francisco in June and arrived at Petropavlovsk 33 days later, where the captain of the Russian corvette Streloch offered "any needed assistance" on behalf of his government in the search for clues of the missing ship.

Berry took on two Chukchis as hunters and dog drivers at Saint Lawrence Bay, and on 20 August, entered the Arctic Ocean. At Herald Island, Berry found out that the crew of the preceding ship, USRC Thomas Corwin, had already covered the island without success. Three days later Berry landed with a party at then still little explored Wrangel Island further to the west and was the first to survey the southern coast and part of the interior, proving that Wrangel was an island and not the southern edge of a polar land mass.

Berry left Wrangel Island on 13 September, and moved north and west until stopped by pack ice on 18. Returning to Wrangel, the search was continued choosing another course until 27. Again blocked by ice, Berry decided to turn south for winter quarters. The first week in October a party was left under Master Charles F. Putnam on Tiapka Island off Cape Serdtse-Kamen with provisions, supplies, and fuel for a year; as well as a boat, dogs, and sleds to explore the coast westward in search of the crews of Jeanette and the missing whalers.

On October 8, 1881, the ship returned to Saint Lawrence Bay in Chukotka, but bad weather prevented the transfer of a large part of her provisions and supplies to the shore. On 30 November, fire broke out in the hold. Through the day, stores were removed to ease the firefighting efforts, but at midnight, the fires still raged and USS Rodgers was abandoned. The burning ship drifted up the bay and early the next day her magazine exploded. A temporary shore camp sheltered the crew until the next day when they moved to the village of Noomamoo, seven miles (10 km) away. Later divided into four parties, most of the crew wintered there and in three nearby villages. As the crew adjusted to life ashore, Lieutenant Berry set out to inform Putnam's camp of the fire. Meanwhile, Master Putnam had learned of the disaster and had started for Saint Lawrence Bay with supplies for the relief of survivors. After reaching the bay, Putnam returned to his camp but lost his way in a blizzard and drifted out to sea on an ice floe. An unsuccessful, month-long search for him was conducted along the coast.

On February 8, 1882, a party under Lieutenant Berry —who had not yet learned of Putnam's loss—set out on another search along the coast for Jeanette's crew. On 24 March, they arrived at the Russian post at Nishne and learned of the landing of part of Jeanette's crew at the mouth of the Lena River the previous September. Berry and his party then returned home.

=== Later life ===
Berry married Mary Augusta Berry (née Brady; 1870–1928) on October 9, 1895; they had no children. He was promoted to the rank of captain on February 1a, 1901 and of rear admiral on July 29, 1906. Berry finally retired from active service in the U.S. Navy on 28 January 1908.

== Honors ==
Rear Admiral Berry died in 1929 and was buried with full military honors at Arlington National Cemetery.

Berry Point, a headland in Wrangel Island, as well as Berry Peak, the highest point of the island, were named after him.
