= Thomas Long (captain) =

American whaling ship master

Thomas W. Long
- Born: 1814
- Died: 1875 (aged 60–61); Tiksi Bay, Sakha, Russia (disputed) or Honolulu, Hawaii
- Resting place: 71°39′N 129°8′E
- Occupation: Whaler
- Known for: Discoverer of Wrangel Island

Thomas W. Long was an American whaling ship master.

== Whaling career ==
Long was captain of the ship John and Elizabeth (296 tons), of New London, in 1854; the ship India (433 tons), of New London, in 1855, 1856, and 1857; the barque Merrimac (414 tons), of New London, in 1858; and the ship Isaac Howland (399 tons), of New Bedford, in 1860, 1861, 1862, and 1863. He used the schooner Caroline (106 tons), of New London and then Honolulu, as tender from 1855 to 1858 and from 1860 to 1862. He sailed to the Sea of Okhotsk each season. In 1854 he obtained 800 barrels of oil. In 1855, up to September 8, he had taken 39 whales, which produced 1,800 to 1,900 barrels of oil; and in three seasons from 1855 to 1857, he got 8,000 to 9,000 barrels of whale oil with the help of his tender Caroline, mainly cruising in Tugur Bay and Academy Bay. He left the Caroline in Mamga Bay for the winter of 1856–1857. When he returned the following season three of the four men left with her had died, with the last expiring shortly after being taken aboard India. In 1858 he caught 52 whales, which produced 1,600 barrels of oil. In 1860 he caught three sperm whales outside of the Sea of Okhotsk as well as four bowhead whales in the sea, which yielded 40 and 200 barrels, respectively. In 1861 he got 1,450 barrels of whale oil and 70 of sperm, and in 1862 he caught 32 bowheads – one of which yielded 250 barrels of oil – for a total of 1,700 barrels of oil. In 1863 he was only able to obtain 600 barrels of oil.

Among his commands was the barque Nile. In 1867, as captain of the Nile during a whaling voyage in the North Pacific Ocean, Long entered the Chukchi Sea and sighted Wrangel Island. He described its southern shores, deeming it was a bigger landmass. Long named it "Wrangel Land" after Russian Navy seaman Ferdinand Wrangel (1797–1870). He also named Cape Hawaii and Cape Thomas on the same island.

...sailed to the eastward along the land during the fifteenth and part of the sixteenth (August 1867), and in some places approached it as near as fifteen miles. I have named this northern land Wrangell Land as an appropriate tribute to the memory of a man who spent three consecutive years north of latitude 68°, and demonstrated the problem of this open polar sea forty-five years ago, although others of much later date have endeavored to claim the merit of this discovery. The west cape of this land I have named Cape Thomas, after the man who first reported the land from the masthead of my ship, and the southeastern cape I have named after the largest island in this group (Hawaii).

== Death ==
Thomas Long died at Tiksi Bay, then known as "Gorely Bay", in the Laptev Sea. There is a cross there marking the site where he perished.

== Honors ==
Long Strait, connecting the East Siberian Sea and the Chukchi Sea, was named after him.
