= USS Rodgers (1881) =

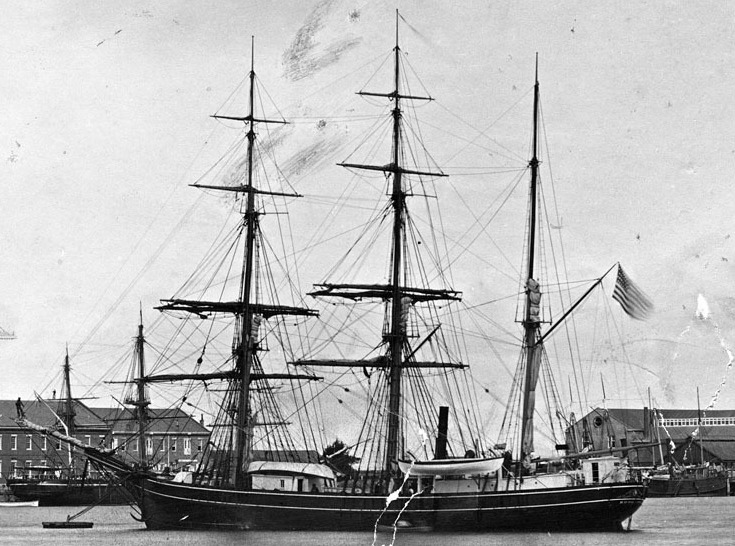

History
- Name: Mary and Helen
- Port of registry: New Bedford, Massachusetts
- Builder: Goss, Sawyer & Packard
- Launched: 17 July 1879
- Fate: purchased by US Navy, 1881

History

United States
- Name: USS Rodgers
- Namesake: Commodore John Rodgers; Rear Admiral John Rodgers
- Operator: United States Navy
- Port of registry: San Francisco, California
- Commissioned: 30 May 1881

General characteristics
- Class & type: Steam whaling barque
- Tonnage: 420 metric tons (413 long tons)
- Length: 138 feet (42.1 meters)
- Beam: 30 1/4 feet (9.2 meters)
- Depth of hold: 16 2/3 feet (5.1 meters)
- Speed: 7 knots (13 km/h; 8.1 mph)
- Complement: 35

USS Rodgers was an American 420-ton steam whaler. Launched in 1879 as Mary and Helen, she was acquired by the United States Navy after Congress—besieged by constituents as well as government agencies—appropriated $175,000 "to enable the Secretary of the Navy to charter, or purchase, equip, and supply a vessel for the prosecution of a search for the USS Jeannette and such other vessels as might be found to need assistance during said cruise; provided that the vessel be wholly manned by volunteers from the Navy." The "other vessels" of most immediate concern were two whalers, Vigilant and Mount Wollaston missing in the Arctic Ocean since 1879.

== Characteristics ==
The vessel purchased was the whaler Mary and Helen, specifically built for Arctic navigation by Goss, Sawyer & Packard of Bath, Maine. Launched on 17 July 1879, she was the first steam whaler built as such for American registry and during her first, and only, season not only justified the faith of her owner, Captain William Lewis of New Bedford, Massachusetts, but revolutionized the American whaling industry.

== Career ==
=== Search for Jeannette ===
Acquired by the Navy at San Francisco, the whaler Mary and Helen was renamed Rodgers and commissioned on 30 May 1881, Lieutenant Robert M. Berry in command. She sailed north on 16 June, and arrived at Petropavlovsk 33 days later, where the captain of the Russian corvette Streloch offered "any needed assistance" on behalf of his government.

Continuing on, Rodgers took on two Chukchis as hunters and dog drivers at Saint Lawrence Bay, and on 20 August, entered the Arctic Ocean. At Herald Island, Berry found that the crew of USRC Thomas Corwin on her second search for Jeanette, had already covered the island, unsuccessfully. Wrangel Land was next. As they looked for clues of the missing ship, the crew of Rodgers surveyed the area and proved that Wrangel was an island and not the southern edge of a polar land mass.

Rodgers departed the island on 13 September, and moved north and west until stopped by pack ice on the 18th. Returning to Wrangell, she continued the search on another course until the 27th. Again blocked by ice, she turned south for winter quarters. The first week in October she left a party, under Master Charles F. Putnam, on Tiapka Island off Cape Serdze with provisions, supplies, and fuel for a year; and a boat, dogs, and sleds to explore the coast westward in search of the crews of Jeanette and the missing whalers.

=== Burning ===
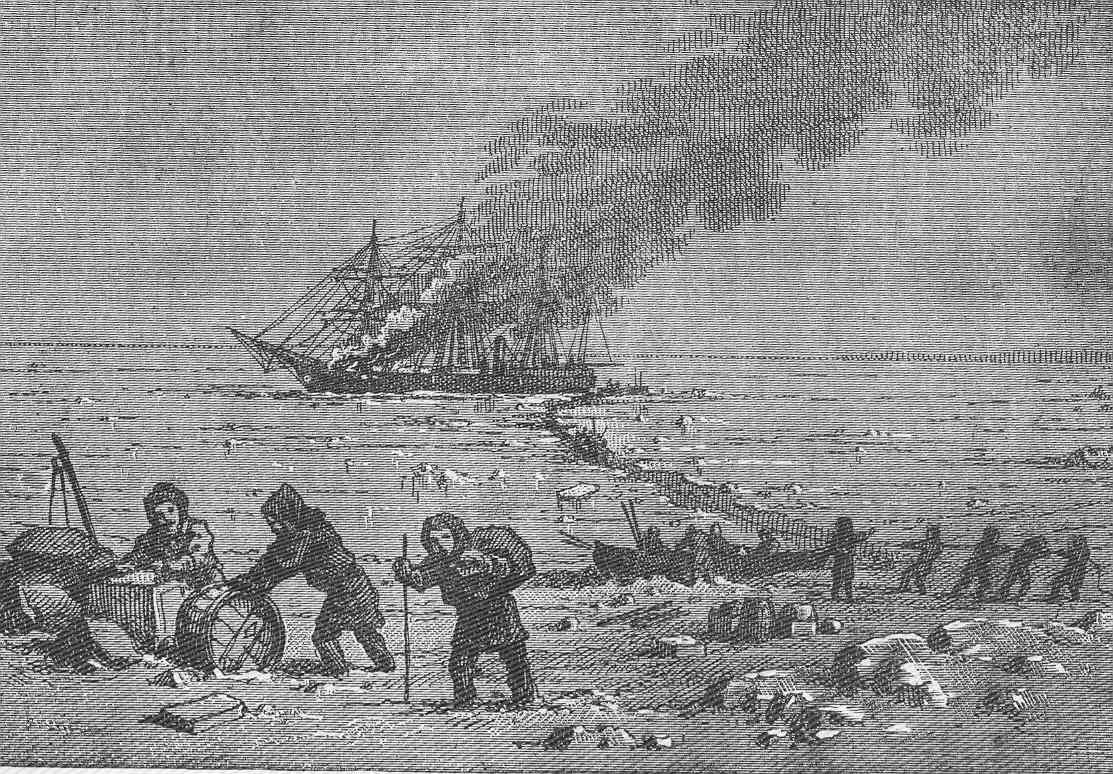
Fires still raged when the former whaler was abandoned

On 8 October 1881, Rodgers steamed for Saint Lawrence Bay, where bad weather prevented the transfer of a large part of her provisions and supplies to the shore. On 30 November, fire broke out in the still tightly-packed hold. Through the day, stores were removed to ease the firefighting efforts, but at midnight, the fires still raged and the former whaler was abandoned.

Rodgers then drifted up the bay, her rigging and sails ablaze. Early the next day her magazine exploded. A temporary shore camp sheltered the crew until the next day when they moved to the village of Noomamoo, seven miles (10 km) away. Later divided into four parties, most of the crew wintered there and in three nearby villages.

As the crew adjusted to life ashore, Lieutenant Berry set out to inform Putnam's camp of the fire. Meanwhile, Master Putnam had learned of the disaster and had started for the Bay with supplies for the relief of survivors. Putnam reached Saint Lawrence Bay, but on returning to his camp lost his way in a blizzard and drifted out to sea on an ice floe. An unsuccessful, month-long search for him was conducted along the coast.

=== Aftermath ===
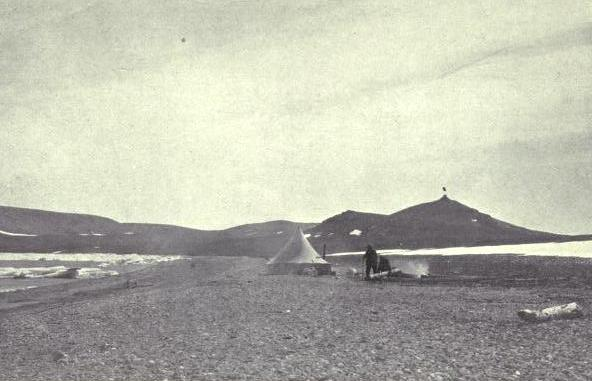
View of Rodgers Harbor

On 8 February 1882, a party under Lieutenant Berry—who had not yet learned of Putnam's loss—set out on another search along the coast for Jeanette's crew. On 24 March, they arrived at the Russian post at Nishne and learned of the landing of part of Jeanette's crew at the mouth of the Lena River the previous September. Berry and his party then returned home from Nishne.

The remaining members of the crew departed Saint Lawrence Bay in May on board the New Bedford whaler North Star and were subsequently transferred to the revenue cutter USRC Thomas Corwin. They returned to San Francisco by way of Sitka, Alaska. During the stop at Sitka, the two surgeons of the Rodgers were kept busy dealing with local epidemics of measles and scarlet fever.

On 12 March 1883, Congress appropriated $3,000 to "suitably reward the natives at and about Saint Lawrence Bay who housed, fed, and extended other kindness to the officers and men of USS Rodgers."

Rodgers Harbor on Wrangel Island was named after this ship.
