= 111th Cavalry =

111th Cavalry may refer to:

- 111th Cavalry Division, Soviet Union
- 111th Cavalry Regiment, United States
- 111th Armored Cavalry Regiment, United States
- 111th (Yorkshire Dragoons) Company, Imperial Yeomanry

== See also ==
- 111th Brigade (disambiguation)
- 111th Division (disambiguation)
- 111th Regiment (disambiguation)
- 111th (disambiguation)
