= 111th =

111th may refer to:

- 111th Delaware General Assembly, a meeting of the legislative branch of the state government
- 111th Engineer Brigade (United States), a combat engineer brigade of the United States Army
- 111th Field Artillery Regiment (United States), a 155MM towed artillery unit with a General Support/Reinforcing mission
- 111th Fighter Escadrille (Poland) of the Polish Air Force, a fighter unit of the Polish Army
- 111th Fighter Wing, an Air National Guard fighter unit located at NAS Willow Grove, Pennsylvania
- 111th Indian Infantry Brigade, an Infantry formation of the Indian Army during World War II
- 111th Infantry Brigade (Pakistan), an infantry brigade of the Pakistan Army
- 111th Infantry Division (German Empire), a unit of the Imperial German Army in World War I
- 111th Infantry Regiment (United States), represented in the U.S. Army by 1st Battalion, 111th Infantry
- 111th Maneuver Enhancement Brigade (United States), an air defense artillery brigade of the United States Army
- 111th meridian east, a line of longitude 111° east of Greenwich
- 111th meridian west, a line of longitude 111° west of Greenwich
- 111th Ohio General Assembly, the legislative body of the state of Ohio in 1975 and 1976
- 111th Ohio Infantry, an infantry regiment in the Union Army during the American Civil War
- 111th Reconnaissance Squadron, an MQ-1 flying squadron attached to the 147th Operations Group, 147th Reconnaissance Wing
- 111th Regiment of Foot (1761), an infantry regiment of the British Army from 1761 to 1763
- 111th Regiment of Foot (Loyal Birmingham Volunteers), an infantry regiment of the British Army from 1794 to 1796
- 111th Space Operations Squadron, an Air National Guard space communications unit at Sky Harbor International Airport, Arizona
- 111th Street – Morgan Park (Metra), one of two Metra railroad stations in the Morgan Park neighborhood of Chicago, Illinois
- 111th Street (BMT Jamaica Line), a skip-stop station on the BMT Jamaica Line of the New York City Subway
- 111th Street (IND Fulton Street Line), a station on the IND Fulton Street Line of the New York City Subway
- 111th Street (IRT Flushing Line), a local station on the IRT Flushing Line of the New York City Subway
- 111th Street (IRT Second Avenue Line), a station on the demolished IRT Second Avenue Line
- 111th United States Congress, from January 3, 2009, until January 3, 2011

Other

- 111 Squadron (disambiguation)
- 111th Regiment (disambiguation)
- 111th Division (disambiguation)

== See also ==
- 111 (number)
- 111, the year 111 (CXI) of the Julian calendar
