= 65th =

65th is the ordinal form of the number 65. 65th or Sixty-fifth may also refer to:

- A fraction, 1/65, equal to one of 65 equal parts

== Geography ==
- 65th meridian east, a line of longitude
- 65th meridian west, a line of longitude
- 65th parallel north, a circle of latitude
- 65th parallel south, a circle of latitude
- 65th Street (disambiguation)

== Military ==
- 65th Army (Soviet Army)
- 65th Air Army
- 65th Army (People's Republic of China)
- 65th Brigade (disambiguation)
- 65th Division (disambiguation)
- 65th Regiment (disambiguation)
- 65th Squadron (disambiguation)

== Other ==
- 65th century
- 65th century BC

== See also ==
- 65 (disambiguation)
