= LXV Corps =

LXV Corps or 65th Corps may refer to:

- 65th Corps (German Empire)
- LXV Army Corps, Wehrmacht, Germany
- 65th (2nd Rutherglen) Lanarkshire Rifle Volunteer Corps, United Kingdom

== See also ==
- List of military corps by number
- 65th Brigade (disambiguation)
- 65th Division (disambiguation)
- 65th Regiment (disambiguation)
- 65th (disambiguation)
