= 67th Army =

67th Army may refer to:

- 67th Group Army, People's Liberation Army, China
- 67th Army (Soviet Union)

== See also ==
- List of armies by number
- 67th Division (disambiguation)
- 67th Brigade (disambiguation)
- 67th Regiment (disambiguation)
- 67th (disambiguation)
