= LXVII Corps =

LXVII Corps or 67th Corps may refer to:

- 67th Corps (German Empire)
- LXVII Army Corps, Wehrmacht, Germany
- 67th Rifle Corps, Soviet Union
- 67th (Worsley) Lancashire Rifle Volunteer Corps, United Kingdom

== See also ==
- List of military corps by number
- 67th Brigade (disambiguation)
- 67th Division (disambiguation)
- 67th Regiment (disambiguation)
- 67th (disambiguation)
