= 65th Cavalry =

65th Cavalry may refer to:

- 65th Cavalry Division, United States
- Cavalry Corps Schmettow, German Army, later reclassified as the 65th Corps
- 65th (Leicestershire) Company, Imperial Yeomanry

== See also ==
- 65th Division (disambiguation)
- 65th Brigade (disambiguation)
- 65th Regiment (disambiguation)
- 65th (disambiguation)
