= 67 =

67 may refer to:

- 67 (number), the number following 66 and preceding 68
- One of the following years: 67 BC, AD 67, 1967, 2067
- "67", a 1992 song by Love Battery from the album Between the Eyes
- 67 (rap group), a drill music group from London
- 67 Asia, a main-belt asteroid
- 6-7, an Internet meme

== See also ==
- "Doot Doot (6 7)", 2025 single by Skrilla
- 6/7 (disambiguation)
- 67th (disambiguation)
- 67th Regiment (disambiguation)
- 67th Division (disambiguation)
- 67 Squadron (disambiguation)
