= 65th Army =

65th Army may refer to:

- 65th Group Army, People's Liberation Army, China
- 65th Army (Soviet Union)
- 65th Air Army, Soviet Union

== See also ==
- List of armies by number
- 65th Division (disambiguation)
- 65th Brigade (disambiguation)
- 65th Regiment (disambiguation)
- 65th (disambiguation)
