= 67th =

67th is the ordinal form of the number 67. 67th or Sixty-seventh may also refer to:

- A fraction, 1/67, equal to one of 67 equal parts

== Geography ==
- 67th meridian east, a line of longitude
- 67th meridian west, a line of longitude
- 67th parallel north, a circle of latitude
- 67th parallel south, a circle of latitude
- 67th Street (disambiguation)

== Military ==
- 67th Division (disambiguation)
- 67th Regiment (disambiguation)
- 67th Squadron (disambiguation)

== Other ==
- 67th century
- 67th century BC

== See also ==
- 67 (disambiguation)
