= 66th meridian =

66th meridian may refer to:

- 66th meridian east, a line of longitude east of the Greenwich Meridian
- 66th meridian west, a line of longitude west of the Greenwich Meridian

66th meridian west	66th meridian east
