= 111 Squadron =

111 Squadron or 111th Squadron may refer to:

- No. 111 Squadron RCAF, Canada
- No. 111 Squadron RAF, United Kingdom
- No. 111 Squadron SLAF, Sri Lanka
- 111 Squadron PN, Pakistani Navy
- 111 Squadron, Republic of Singapore Air Force
- 111th Aero Squadron, Air Service, United States Army
- 111th Attack Squadron, United States Air Force
- 111th Reconnaissance Squadron, United States Air Force
- 111th Space Operations Squadron, United States Air Force
- VF-111, United States Navy
- VF-111 (1956–1995), United States Navy
- VFC-111, United States Navy

== See also ==
- 111th Division (disambiguation)
- 111th Regiment (disambiguation)
