= 111th Regiment =

111th Regiment or 111th Infantry Regiment may refer to:

- 111th Aviation Regiment (United States)
- 111th Fighter Aviation Regiment, Yugoslavia
- 111th Helicopter Regiment, Yugoslavia
- 111th Regiment of Foot (Loyal Birmingham Volunteers), a unit of the British Army
- 111th Regiment of Foot (1761), a unit of the British Army
- 111th Infantry Regiment (United States), a unit of the United States Army
- 111th Armored Cavalry Regiment, a unit of the United States Army National Guard
- 111th Cavalry Regiment, a unit of the United States Army National Guard

== See also ==
- 111th Brigade (disambiguation)
- 111th Division (disambiguation)
- 111 Squadron (disambiguation)
