= 67th meridian =

67th meridian may refer to:

- 67th meridian east, a line of longitude east of the Greenwich Meridian
- 67th meridian west, a line of longitude west of the Greenwich Meridian

67th meridian west	67th meridian east
