= 65th meridian =

65th meridian may refer to:

- 65th meridian east, a line of longitude east of the Greenwich Meridian
- 65th meridian west, a line of longitude west of the Greenwich Meridian

| 65th meridian west | 65th meridian east |
