= 111th Regiment of Foot =

Two regiments of the British Army have been numbered the 111th Regiment of Foot:

- 111th Regiment of Foot (1761), raised in 1761
- 111th Regiment of Foot (Loyal Birmingham Volunteers), raised in 1794
