= 68th meridian =

68th meridian may refer to:

- 68th meridian east, a line of longitude east of the Greenwich Meridian
- 68th meridian west, a line of longitude west of the Greenwich Meridian

68th meridian west	68th meridian east
