= 115th meridian =

115th meridian may refer to:

- 115th meridian east, a line of longitude east of the Greenwich Meridian
- 115th meridian west, a line of longitude west of the Greenwich Meridian

115th meridian west	115th meridian east
