= Aulitiving Island =

Island in Canada

- Location within Nunavut Location within Canada

Geography
- Location: Northern Canada
- Coordinates: 69°33′36″N 067°33′00″W
- Archipelago: Arctic Archipelago
- Area: 78 km^{2} (30 sq mi)

Administration
- Canada
- Territory: Nunavut
- Region: Qikiqtaaluk

Demographics
- Population: Uninhabited

Aulitiving Island is an uninhabited island located in the Qikiqtaaluk Region of Nunavut, Canada. It is located in Baffin Bay's Isabella Bay by the Davis Strait. It is situated north of Baffin Island's Henry Kater Peninsula. Aulitivik Island is 19.5 km (12.1 mi) to the west, with tiny Bearslide Island lying between them.

== Geography ==
It has an area of 78 km^{2} (30 sq mi).
