= 111th meridian =

111th meridian may refer to:

- 111th meridian east, a line of longitude east of the Greenwich Meridian
- 111th meridian west, a line of longitude west of the Greenwich Meridian

111th meridian west	111th meridian east
