= 113th meridian =

113th meridian may refer to:

- 113th meridian east, a line of longitude east of the Greenwich Meridian
- 113th meridian west, a line of longitude west of the Greenwich Meridian

113th meridian west	113th meridian east
