= 112th meridian =

112th meridian may refer to:

- 112th meridian east, a line of longitude east of the Greenwich Meridian
- 112th meridian west, a line of longitude west of the Greenwich Meridian

112th meridian west	112th meridian east
