= 69th meridian =

69th meridian may refer to:

- 69th meridian east, a line of longitude east of the Greenwich Meridian
- 69th meridian west, a line of longitude west of the Greenwich Meridian

69th meridian west	69th meridian east
