= 114th meridian =

114th meridian may refer to:

- 114th meridian east, a line of longitude east of the Greenwich Meridian
- 114th meridian west, a line of longitude west of the Greenwich Meridian

| 114th meridian west | 114th meridian east |
