= 200th Infantry Regiment (United States) =

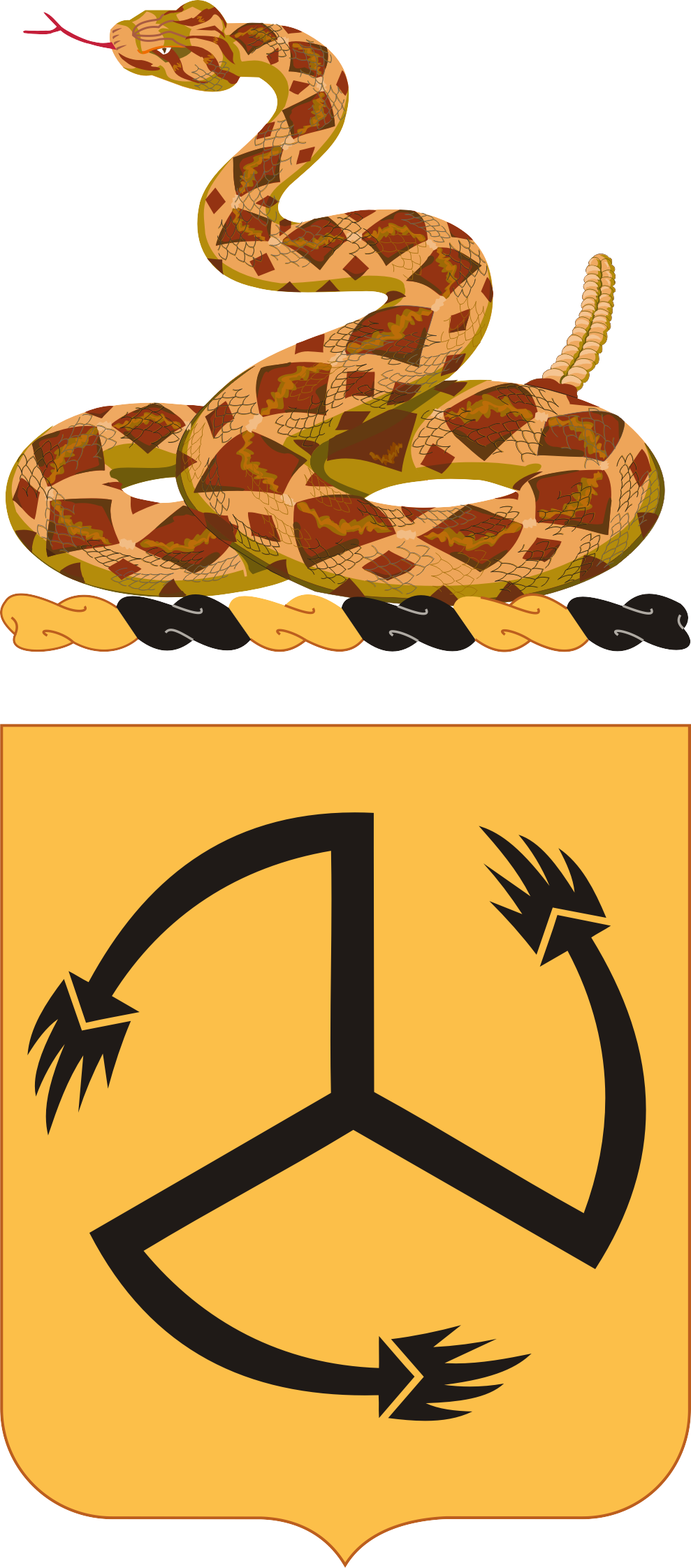
- Coat of arms
- Active: 1880
- Country: United States
- Branch: United States Army
- Type: Light infantry
- Mottos: "Pro Civitate et Patria" (For state and country)
- Branch color: Scarlet
- Mascot: Oozlefinch
- Decorations: Presidential Unit Citation with two oak leaf clusters Philippine Republic Presidential Unit Citation

Commanders
- Notable commanders: Colonel Charles Sage

The 200th Coast Artillery (AA) (200 CA) was a United States Army unit during the first half of World War II. Today descendant elements serve with the New Mexico Army National Guard as the 200th Infantry.

== History ==
Most of this section is taken from Army Lineage Series: Air Defense Artillery by Janice E. McKenney.

=== Cavalry and infantry ===
The 200th Infantry Regiment traces its origins to the organization, on 1 September 1880, of the 1st Regiment in the New Mexico Volunteer Militia in west-central New Mexico from previous independent companies. It was divided on 18 February 1882 into the 1st Regiment, with headquarters at Socorro; and the 2nd Regiment with headquarters at Albuquerque.

The 1st Regiment was expanded 25 April 1883 to form the 1st Regiment and the 2nd Cavalry Battalion (1st Regiment; hereafter, separate lineage). 2nd Cavalry was reorganized and redesignated 14 September 1883 as the 1st Regiment of Cavalry (less 3rd Battalion; see below). It was reorganized 10 November 1885 as the 1st Regiment of Cavalry. It was disbanded 29 December 1893 and two remaining troops attached to the 1st Regiment of Infantry. The unit was reorganized 12 September 1896 in the New Mexico Volunteer Militia as the 1st Battalion of Cavalry with headquarters at Santa Fe. (New Mexico Volunteer Militia redesignated 17 March 1897 as the New Mexico National Guard.) The unit was redesignated in 1897 as the 1st Squadron of Cavalry. While remaining in state service the 1st Squadron of Cavalry additionally formed the 2nd Squadron, 1st United States Volunteer Cavalry, also known as the "Rough Riders" (mustered into federal service 6–7 May 1898 at Santa Fe; mustered out of federal service 15 September 1898 at Montauk Point, New York). Troop A attached 5 February 1908 to the 1st Regiment of Infantry (see below); remainder of squadron concurrently disbanded.

The 2nd Regiment was expanded 25 April 1883 to form the 2nd Regiment and the 1st Cavalry Battalion. The 2nd Regiment was redesignated 10 November 1885 as the 1st Regiment of Infantry with headquarters at Santa Fe. Location of headquarters was changed 16 August 1886 to Albuquerque.

The 1st Cavalry Battalion was reorganized and redesignated 14 September 1883 as the 3rd Battalion, 1st Regiment of Cavalry. The unit was expanded, reorganized and redesignated 10 November 1885 as the 2nd Regiment of Cavalry.

The 1st Regiment of Infantry and elements of the 2nd Regiment of Cavalry were consolidated 24 December 1890 and consolidated unit designated at the 1st Regiment of Infantry. 1st Regiment of Infantry was consolidated in 1909 with Troop A (see above) and consolidated unit designated as the 1st Regiment of Infantry. The unit was mustered into federal service 21 April 1917 and its elements reorganized and redesignated as elements of the 115th Train Headquarters and Military Police and the 143rd and 144th Machine Gun Battalions, elements of the 40th Division.

The Military Police section of the 115th Train Headquarters and Military Police was reorganized and redesignated 27 October 1918 as the 40th Military Police Company, an element of the 40th Division, and the 115th Train Headquarters and Military Police was concurrently reorganized and redesignated as the 115th Train Headquarters. The 40th Military Police Company demobilized 2 May 1919 at Camp Kearny, California, and the 115th Train Headquarters was demobilized 25 April 1919 at Camp Kearny.

The 143rd and 144th Machine Gun Battalions demobilized 30 April 1919 at Camp Grant, Illinois.

The former 1st Regiment of Infantry was reconstituted 16 July 1919 in the New Mexico National Guard as a separate squadron of cavalry and organized with Troops A and B at Albuquerque and Carlsbad, respectively. It was expanded, reorganized and redesignated 3 December 1920 as the 1st Cavalry. It was redesignated 2 May 1922 as the 111th Cavalry. Headquarters federally recognized 4 May 1924 at Santa Fe. Assigned 5 November 1923 to the 23rd Cavalry Division. Relieved 15 March 1929 from assignment to the 23rd Cavalry Division.

=== First creation of 200th Coast Artillery (AA) in North Carolina ===
The first entity designated the 200th Coast Artillery Regiment (Antiaircraft) existed from 1921 until 5 September 1927 in the North Carolina National Guard. The regiment was constituted in the National Guard in 1921 as the 200th Artillery Regiment (Antiaircraft), Coast Artillery Corps. Battery G, its only active element, was organized on 5 August 1921 at Raeford, North Carolina and assigned to the IV Corps. Additional elements were allocated as follows, but were never organized: Regimental Headquarters and Headquarters Battery (HHB) and Batteries B, C, D, E, F, I, K, and L allotted to Louisiana; Battery A allotted to Alabama; and Battery M allotted to Florida. New Orleans, Louisiana was designated as the headquarters location on organization, but the unit was never organized at that location. Regiment redesignated 200th Coast Artillery (Antiaircraft) on 27 September 1924. On 1 December 1926 Battery G was redesignated as Battery F, 252nd Coast Artillery Battalion (Harbor Defense) in the North Carolina National Guard; the other elements were withdrawn from their allotted states and transferred to the deferred list. When the deferred list was abandoned, the regiment was withdrawn from the National Guard and demobilized on 5 September 1927. It had a separate lineage from the New Mexico National Guard unit.

At some later time the designation was transferred to the New Mexico National Guard.

=== Antiaircraft artillery ===
The 111th Cavalry, tracing its lineage back to the 1st Regiment, New Mexico Volunteer Militia (1880), was converted and redesignated on 26 April 1940 as the 207th Coast Artillery Regiment (Antiaircraft). Redesignated as the 200th Coast Artillery (AA) on 1 July 1940, with the "207th CA" designation being transferred to the converted 107th Infantry Regiment, a New York National Guard unit.

It was inducted into federal service 6 January 1941 at home stations in New Mexico. The 200th CA was equipped with 12 3-inch guns (an older model with a vertical range of 8,200 m), water-cooled .50-caliber machine guns, and 60-inch (1.5 m) Sperry searchlights.

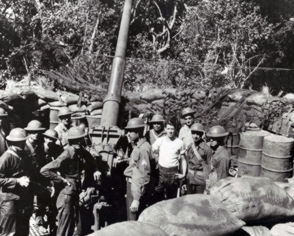
200th Coast Artillery gunners in the Philippines, 1942.

The 200th was doubled in size with draftees to 1,800 men while at Fort Bliss preparing for overseas deployment. In August 1941, the 200th was given notice that it had been selected for an overseas assignment of great importance. The Arkansas National Guard 206th CA and the 200th competed for deployment to either the Philippines or the Aleutian Islands. The 200th, whose personnel virtually all spoke fluent Spanish, were chosen to go to the Philippines, and arrived there in September 1941. Upon arrival it was assigned to the US Army Forces in the Far East (USAFFE) and ordered to provide air defenses for Clark Field while based at Fort Stotsenburg, although they were not attached to the Philippine Coast Artillery Command, which was primarily a harbor defense command. At about 0300 hours on 8 December 1941, the 200th went on full alert when the night radio crew picked up commercial broadcasts telling of the Japanese attack on Pearl Harbor, Hawaii.

The 200th CA surrendered on 9 April 1942 to the Japanese 14th Army. Elements of the unit were forced by the Japanese to march into captivity in the Bataan Death March.

The Headquarters, 200th Coast Artillery, was redesignated 31 May 1946 as Headquarters and Headquarters Battery, 200th Antiaircraft Artillery Group. Headquarters, 200th Antiaircraft Artillery Group, organized and federally recognized 25 September 1947 at Roswell. It was reorganized and was redesignated 1 September 1959 as Headquarters, 200th Artillery Group. It was consolidated 15 December 1967 with the 200th Artillery and consolidated unit designated at the 200th Artillery, a parent regiment under the Combat Arms Regimental system.

The 2nd Battalion, 200th Coast Artillery, was redesignated 31 May 1946 as the 697th Antiaircraft Artillery Automatic Weapons Battalion. It was reorganized and federally recognized 2 November 1947 in southeastern New Mexico with headquarters at Roswell. Redesignated 1 October 1953 as the 697th Antiaircraft Artillery Battalion.

The 716th, 717th, 726th and 697th Antiaircraft Artillery Battalions; Headquarters, 515th Antiaircraft Artillery Group; 502nd Field Artillery Battalion (organized and federally recognized 21 September 1956 in eastern New Mexico with headquarters at Clovis); 120th Antiaircraft Artillery Battalion; and 804th Antiaircraft Artillery Battalion consolidated 1 September 1959 and consolidated unit reorganized and redesignated as the 200th Artillery, a parent regiment under the Combat Arms Regimental System, to consist of the 1st Automatic Weapons Battalion; the 2nd, 3rd, 4th, 5th and 6th Gun Battalions; and the 7th and 8th Detachments. The headquarters battery of the 2nd Battalion, reorganized from that of the 200th Antiaircraft Artillery Group, was at Las Cruces. Reorganized 1 April 1962 to consist of the 1st, 2nd, 3rd, 4th, 5th and 6th Automatic Weapons Battalions and the 7th and 8th Detachments. Consolidated 15 December 1967 with Headquarters, 200th Artillery, a parent regiment under the Combat Arms Regimental system, to consist of the 1st, 2nd, 3rd and 4th Battalions.

The unit was redesignated 1 November 1972 as the 200th Air Defense Artillery. Reorganized 1 September 1975 to consist of the 1st Battalion, an element of the 49th Armored Division; the 2nd Battalion, an element of the 47th Infantry Division; the 3rd Battalion, an element of the 50th Armored Division; and the 4th Battalion, an element of the 40th Infantry Division. 1st Battalion headquarters was at Roswell, 2nd Battalion at Las Cruces, 3rd Battalion at Albuquerque, and 4th Battalion at Tucumcari. Equipped with the M42 Duster self-propelled anti-aircraft gun, the battalions served as divisional air defense artillery units of National Guard divisions but were under the administrative control of the 111th Air Defense Artillery Brigade headquarters. The 5th Battalion was activated on 1 July 1983, the first and only Roland-equipped United States Army unit, and reached initial operating capability in December 1985. The majority of its personnel volunteered for full-time service at McGregor Range, administered by Fort Bliss. As a result, the battalion was affiliated with the active 11th Air Defense Artillery Brigade and under the control of Central Command and Forces Command. During its five years of existence, the battalion made 101 Roland firings during exercises.

The 4th Battalion replaced its now obsolete M42 Dusters with the Chaparral missile system and its Battery B at Springer became the headquarters and headquarters battery of the new 6th Battalion on 15 November 1986. Battery A of the 6th Battalion was at Raton with Detachment 1 at Clayton, Battery B at Taos, and Battery C at Espanola. Battery C was converted from a heavy equipment maintenance detachment.

It was reorganized on 3 March 1987 to consist of the 1st Battalion, an element of the 49th Armored Division; the 2nd Battalion, an element of the 4th Infantry Division; the 3rd Battalion, an element of the 50th Armored Division; 4th Battalion, an element of the 40th Infantry Division; and the 5th and 7th Battalions. The 5th and 7th Battalions were equipped with the Roland and Hawk air defense missiles respectively.

The 5th Battalion, with 300 out of 400 personnel full-time, was inactivated on 30 September 1988 due to budget cuts and the retirement of the Roland system; 143 of its full-time personnel transferred to the 7th Battalion at Rio Rancho. The regiment was withdrawn on 1 June 1989 from the Combat Arms Regimental System and reorganized under the United States Army Regimental System with headquarters at Roswell.

During annual training in 1989, 7th Battalion, 200th ADA, became the first Army reserve component unit to live-fire the Hawk air defense missile.

On 1 October 1993, the Headquarters Battery of the 2nd Battalion at Las Cruces was expanded into a new 2nd Battalion, transitioning from the Chaparral to the Hawk. Hawk-trained personnel from the 7th Battalion were planned to transfer to the new unit if they desired to. HHB and Batteries A and B were located in Las Cruces, while Battery C was in Alamogordo. The battalion was converted into the 1st Battalion, 202nd Field Artillery on 15 December 1995. By 1996, 6th Battalion was assigned as the divisional air defense battalion for the 42nd Infantry Division and in the process of transitioning to the Avenger missile system.

The 7th Battalion was announced as the second National Guard Patriot missile battalion in December 1997, but the equipment did not begin arriving until March 1998, piecemeal. As a result of the Patriot conversion, the 7th was redesignated as the 2nd that year. Due to the demanding nature of Patriot training, the 2nd Battalion struggled to fill its ranks: in mid-2003 it had only 202 soldiers out of an authorized strength of 547. By that point, three Patriot launchers out of fifteen authorized had been delivered to the unit, enough for two of five required batteries. The Avenger-equipped 4th Battalion was inactivated in 2003 and replaced by a military police unit. At the time, it had batteries in Rio Rancho, Raton, Tucumcari, and Clovis.

Today the regiment has elements serving with the New Mexico Army National Guard. Colonel Bump transitioned the 3rd Battalion, 200th ADA, to infantry in 2005, and the battalion was redesignated the 1st Battalion, 200th Infantry. The 1st Battalion, headquartered at Roswell, was converted into the 717th Support Battalion in early 2006 due to the reduced need for air defense units during the war on terror. The 2nd Battalion was inactivated in the second half of 2005, its personnel spread among new support and infantry units.

On 4 September 2005, the 2nd Battalion, 200th Infantry was converted from the 1st Battalion, 202nd Field Artillery as a light infantry unit. The battalion included HHC and rifle and forward support companies at Las Cruces and a heavy weapons company at Alamogordo. The battalion was inactivated on 25 September 2008.

=== 515th Coast Artillery (Antiaircraft) ===
On 19 December 1941 the 515th Coast Artillery (Antiaircraft) was activated at Fort Stotsenburg as a provisional AAA regiment by the expansion and redesignation of one battalion of the 200th CA. It was originally designated "Provisional 200th CA (AA) Regiment of Manila" on 8 December 1941, initially with 20 officers and 500 enlisted men manning AA weapons previously stored in the Manila area. The number "515th" was taken from an Organized Reserve regiment in Lincoln, Nebraska, organized in 1924, that probably had few personnel assigned. On 19 December 1941 the regiment was redesignated as the 515th and augmented with about 750 officers and enlisted men of the Philippine Commonwealth Army for training. Moved from Manila 25 December 1941 (the day before Manila was declared an open city) to defend the withdrawal routes to Bataan, where the unit defended the Cabcaben airfield and other key points until surrendering as part of the Philippine Provisional Coast Artillery Brigade on 9 April 1942.

== Distinctive unit insignia ==
- Description

A Gold color metal and enamel device 1 1/4 inches (3.2 cm) in height overall consisting of a shield blazoned: Or an Avanyu Sable. Attached above the shield from a wreath Or and Sable, a coiled rattlesnake Brün. Attached below and to the sides of the shield a Gold scroll inscribed "PRO CIVITATE ET PATRIA" in Black letters.

- Symbolism

The Avanyu device used by the Pueblo Indians is another form of the triskelion, a lucky talisman and symbolic of energy, motion, and victory. It is also emblematic of "the whirling sun" and "lightning in air" which allude to the firepower and air defense mission of the former unit. The motto translates to "For State and Country."

- Background

The distinctive unit insignia was originally approved for the 111th Cavalry Regiment on 19 June 1926. It was redesignated for the 200th Coast Artillery Regiment (AA) on 7 March 1941. It was redesignated for the 717th Antiaircraft Artillery Gun Battalion on 6 October 1952. The insignia was redesignated for the 200th Artillery Regiment on 7 June 1960. It was redesignated for the 200th Air Defense Artillery Regiment on 9 February 1973. It was redesignated for the 200th Infantry Regiment with the description and symbolism updated on 22 August 2006.

== Coat of arms ==
=== Blazon ===
- Shield

Or an Avanyu Sable. (The Avanyu is a Pueblo Indian device not unlike the device of the Isle of Man conventionalized, which is blazoned three legs embowed conjoined at the thighs, the three arms of the Avanyu each ending in a triangular head bearing five points).

- Crest

That for the regiments of the New Mexico Army National Guard: On a wreath of the colors Or and Sable, a coiled rattlesnake Proper. Motto: PRO CIVITATE ET PATRIA (For State and Country).

=== Symbolism ===
- Shield

The Avanyu device used by the Pueblo Indians is another form of the triskelion, a lucky talisman and symbolic of energy, motion, and victory. It is also emblematic of "the whirling sun" and "lightning in air" which allude to the firepower and air defense mission of the former unit.

- Crest

The crest is that of the New Mexico Army National Guard.

=== Background ===
The coat of arms was originally approved for the 111th Cavalry Regiment on 2 January 1924. It was amended to correct the motto on 18 June 1928. It was redesignated for the 200th Coast Artillery Regiment (AA) on 7 March 1941. It was redesignated for the 717th Antiaircraft Artillery Gun Battalion on 6 October 1952. The insignia was redesignated for the 200th Artillery Regiment on 7 June 1960. It was redesignated for the 200th Air Defense Artillery Regiment on 9 February 1973. It was redesignated for the 200th Infantry Regiment with the symbolism revised on 22 August 2006.

== Campaign participation credit ==
This list includes campaigns of the 200th CA (AA), 515th CA (AA), 120th Engineer Combat Battalion (45th Infantry Division), 804th Tank Destroyer Battalion, and predecessors.

Indian Wars

- New Mexico 1881
- New Mexico 1882

War with Spain

- Santiago

World War I

- Streamer without inscription

World War II

- Sicily (with arrowhead)
- Naples-Foggia (with arrowhead)
- Anzio
- Rome-Arno
- Southern France (with arrowhead)
- Northern Apennines
- Rhineland
- Ardennes-Alsace
- Central Europe
- Po Valley
- Philippine Islands

== Decorations ==
- Presidential Unit Citation
- Presidential Unit Citation (Philippines)
