= 40th Armored Division =

- 40th Armored Division shoulder sleeve insignia
- Active: 1954–67
- Country: United States
- Allegiance: California
- Branch: United States Army
- Type: Armor
- Role: Armored warfare
- Size: Division
- Part of: California Army National Guard
- Nickname: "Grizzly"

Commanders
- Notable commanders: Charles A. Ott Jr.

Insignia
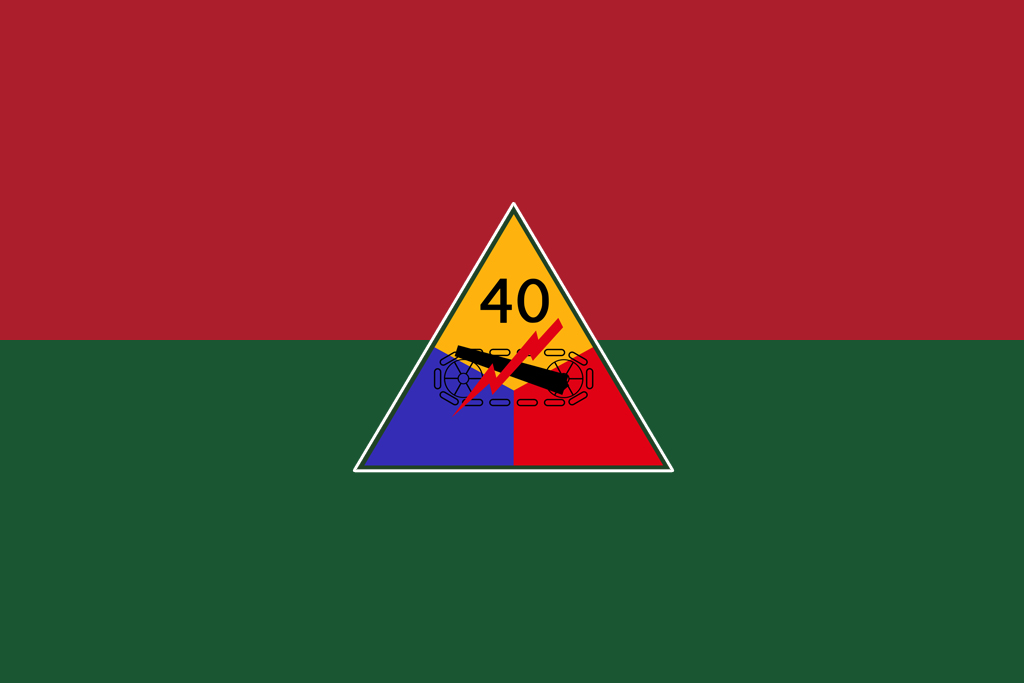
- Flag of the United States Army 40th Armored Division

The 40th Armored Division was a division of the United States Army National Guard from July 1954 until 1967.

== History ==
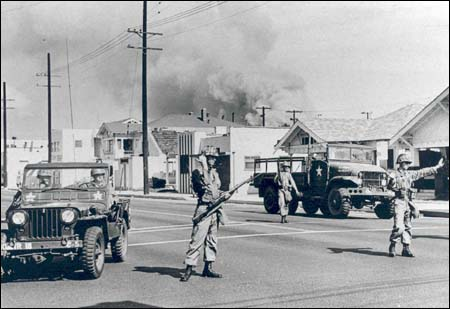
Division soldiers direct traffic away from an area of South Central Los Angeles burning during the Watts riots.

After its return from the Korean War, the 40th Infantry Division was reorganized on 1 July 1954 as the 40th Armored Division, along with elements of the 111th Armored Cavalry Regiment.

In August 1965 the division was deployed to help suppress the Watts riots.

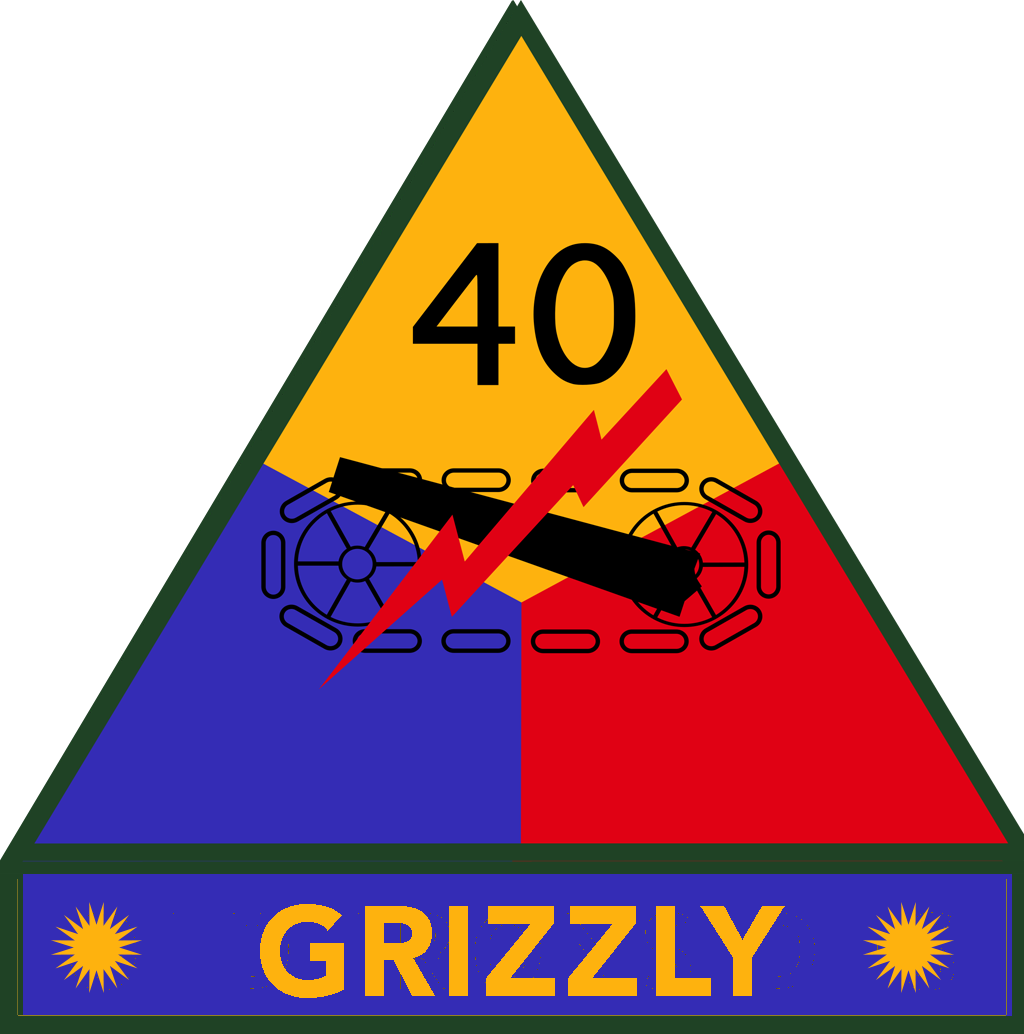
40th Armored Division "nickname" unauthorized SSI

On 1 December 1967, a major reorganization of the National Guard reduced the Guard to eight combat divisions, with the 40th Armored Division as one of the units designated for inactivation. On 29 January 1968, the Division was eliminated and the 40th Infantry Brigade and 40th Armored Brigade were organized.

== 1954-1959 order of battle ==
Also can be referred to as the Pre-Pentomic structure of the 40th Armored Division.

- Division Headquarters
- 40th Military Police Company
- 40th Armored Signal Company
- 140th Replacement Company
- 132d Armored Engineer Battalion
- 40th Armored Division Train
  - 40th Armored Quartermaster Battalion
  - 40th Armored Ordnance Battalion
  - 40th Armored Medical Battalion
  - 40th Armored Division Band
- Combat Command A
  - 111th Reconnaissance Battalion
  - 160th Armored Infantry Battalion
  - 161st Armored Infantry Battalion
- Combat Command B
  - 133d Tank Battalion
  - 134th Tank Battalion
  - 224th Armored Infantry Battalion
- Combat Command C
  - 139th Tank Battalion
  - 140th Tank Battalion
  - 223rd Armored Infantry Battalion
- Division Artillery
  - 215th Anti-Aircraft Artillery Battalion
  - 143d Armored Field Artillery Battalion
  - 214th Armored Field Artillery Battalion
  - 215th Armored Field Artillery Battalion
  - 225th Armored Field Artillery Battalion

== 1967 order of battle ==
- Division Headquarters
- 132nd Engineer Battalion
- 240th Signal Battalion
- 140th Aviation Battalion
- 40th Armored Division Band
- 1st Brigade
  - 1st Battalion, 160th Infantry
  - 2nd Battalion, 160th Infantry
  - 3rd Battalion, 160th Infantry
  - 1st Battalion, 185th Armor
  - 3rd Battalion, 185th Armor
- 2d Brigade
  - 4th Battalion, 160th Infantry
  - 2d Battalion, 185th Armor
  - 1st Reconnaissance Squadron, 18th Armored Cavalry
  - 1st Squadron, 111th Cavalry
- 3d Brigade
  - 4th Battalion, 185th Armor
  - 5th Battalion, 185th Armor
  - 6th Battalion, 185th Armor
- Division Artillery
  - 1st Battalion, 144th Field Artillery
  - 2d Battalion, 144th Field Artillery
  - 3d Battalion, 144th Field Artillery
  - 4th Battalion, 144th Field Artillery
  - 5th Battalion, 144th Field Artillery
- Division Support Command
  - 40th Medical Battalion
  - 40th Maintenance Battalion
  - 123d Maintenance Company
  - 40th Supply and Transportation Battalion
  - 540th Administration Company
  - 40th Military Police Company
