= Charles A. Ott Jr. =

United States Army general

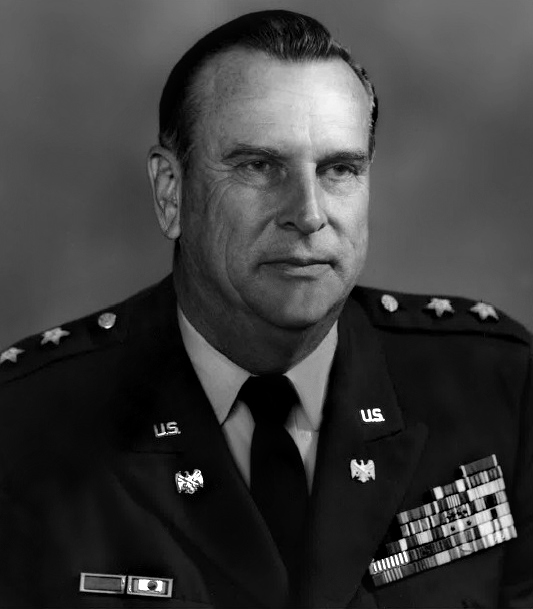
- Major General Charles A. Ott Jr. as Director of the Army National Guard, circa 1975
- Born: September 26, 1920; Santa Barbara, California, U.S.
- Died: December 9, 2006 (aged 86); Santa Barbara, California, U.S.
- Burial place: Santa Barbara Cemetery
- Spouse: Patricia Jane Parrish (m. 1943)
- Children: 3
- Military career
- Allegiance: United States of America
- Branch: United States Army
- Service years: 1941–1978
- Rank: Major General
- Units: California Army National Guard; Army National Guard
- Commands: 76th Field Artillery Battalion; 981st Field Artillery Battalion; 40th Infantry Division Artillery; 40th Armored Division Artillery; 40th Armored Division; 40th Infantry Division; California National Guard Southern Emergency Operations Center; 79th Rear Area Operations Support Center; Army National Guard
- Conflicts: World War II; Korean War
- Awards: Army Distinguished Service Medal; Legion of Merit; Bronze Star Medal; Air Medal; Army Commendation Medal
- Other work: President, Ott Hardware and other businesses Director, Arizona Division of Emergency Services

Charles Adam Ott Jr. (September 26, 1920 – December 9, 2006) was a United States Army major general who served as commander of the 40th Armored Division and 40th Infantry Division, and director of the Army National Guard.

== Early life ==
Charles Adam Ott Jr. was born on September 26, 1920, in Santa Barbara, California, the son of Charles Adam Ott Sr. and Leona Elizabeth (Theote) Ott. He attended the public schools of Santa Barbara and was a 1937 graduate of Santa Barbara High School. Ott graduated from Stanford University with a Bachelor of Arts degree in economics in 1941 and was the Honor Graduate of his Reserve Officers' Training Corps class.

== World War II ==
Commissioned as a second lieutenant of artillery, Ott completed the Artillery Officer Basic Course in 1941, the Artillery Officer Advanced Course in 1942, and the United States Army Command and General Staff College in 1943.

Ott served in Europe during the war, first with the 76th Field Artillery Battalion, including assignments as battery commander, battalion operations and training officer (S-3), executive officer, and commander. He later served as operations and training officer for the 18th Field Artillery Group, and carried out an assignment in California on the staff of the Sixth United States Army. He was a lieutenant colonel when he was discharged in 1946.

== Interbellum ==
After the war, Ott returned to Santa Barbara and pursued a business career as an executive of his family's business, Ott Hardware, and he became the company's president upon the retirement of his father. He also served as president of Sterling Supply Corporation and Channel Properties, Incorporated.

Ott continued his military career with the California Army National Guard as commander of the 981st Field Artillery Battalion.

== Korean War ==
In 1950, Ott was called to federal service with the 40th Infantry Division for the Korean War. He served as commander of the division artillery, and received promotion to colonel.

== Senior command ==
In 1952, Ott was promoted to brigadier general as commander of the 40th Armored Division Artillery.

Ott was assigned as assistant division commander of the 40th Armored Division in 1958. In 1960, he was promoted to major general and assigned as commander of the 40th Armored Division. In August, 1965, Ott commanded the division when it was activated in response to the Watts Riots.

Ott also served as commander of the California National Guard's Southern Emergency Operations Center and commander of the 79th Rear Area Operations Support Center.

In 1969 he commanded National Guard members activated in response to flooding in Santa Barbara County and other areas of Southern California.

In 1971, he was named deputy commander of the California National Guard, and in January 1974, he received appointment as commander of the 40th Infantry Division.

In 1974, Ott was appointed director of the Army National Guard, serving until his 1978 retirement.

Ott's awards included the Army Distinguished Service Medal, Legion of Merit, Bronze Star Medal, Air Medal, and Army Commendation Medal.

== Later career ==
After retiring from the military, Ott served as director of the Arizona Division of Emergency Services.

Ott died at Santa Barbara Cottage Hospital on December 9, 2006. He is buried at Santa Barbara Cemetery, Summit Lot 683, Grave 03.

== Family ==
In February 1943, Ott married Patricia Jane Parrish. They were the parents of three children.
