= List of people who died of starvation =

This is a list of people who died of starvation.

== List ==
Name	Life	Country of origin	Comments	Ref.
Agrippina the Elder	14 BC–33 AD	Roman Empire	Roman imperial princess, granddaughter of Augustus and mother of Caligula, starved to death (perhaps on the orders of Tiberius) in her exile on the island of Pandateria.	
Anaxagoras of Clazomenae	510–428 BC	Roman Empire	Greek philosopher, sage, mathematician, physicist and astronomer.	
Gaius Asinius Gallus	38 BC–33 AD	Roman Empire	Senator who starved after being imprisoned by Tiberius.	
Denny Barry	1883-1923	Irish Free State	Irish Republican who died during the 1923 Irish hunger strikes	
Boyi and Shuqi	1045 BC	China	Shang dynasty loyalists	
Bimbisara	558–491 BC	Magadha	King of Magadha from 542 to 492 BC. He was imprisoned by his son Ajatashatru in order to ascend the throne and died before he could be released.	
Maud de Braose	1155–1210	England	English noblewoman accused King John of England of the murder of the young duke Arthur of Brittany	
Robert O'Hara Burke	1821–1861	United Kingdom	Leader of the Burke and Wills expedition, which was the first expedition to cross Australia from south to north.	
William John Wills	1834–1861	United Kingdom	Member of the Burke and Wills expedition, which was the first expedition to cross Australia from south to north.	
Frank E. Butler	1847–1926	United States	American sharpshooter and husband to Annie Oakley	
Karen Carpenter	1950–1983	United States	American singer and drummer	
Chandragupta Maurya	340–297 BC	Maurya Empire	Emperor of the Mauryan empire (300 BC), who reputedly died of self-starvation as a Jain.	
Floyd Collins	1887–1925	United States	American cave explorer and famous cave accident victim; died in Sand Cave, near Cave City, Kentucky, part of Mammoth Cave National Park	
George Washington DeLong	1844–1881	United States	North Pole explorer, and his crew.	
George Donner	1784–1847	United States	American co-leader of the infamous frontier Donner Party, who resorted to cannibalism and murder to stay alive after an early winter snowfall stranded them while crossing the Sierra Nevada Mountains into California.	
Drusus Caesar	7–33	Roman Empire	Roman imperial prince, son of Germanicus and brother of Caligula, starved to death in his prison on the orders of Tiberius.	
Eratosthenes	276–195	Ancient Greece	Eminent Greek thinker.	
Pavel Filonov	1883–1941	Soviet Union	Russian avant-garde painter, art theorist, and poet.	
Kurt Gödel	1906–1978	Austria	Groundbreaking mathematician who starved to death after his wife was hospitalized and could no longer prepare his meals.	
Yury Ivanovich	1480–1536	Grand Principality of Moscow	Son of Ivan III who starved in prison.	
Pope John XIV	d. 984	Papal States	Pope from 983 to 984. He was placed in prison by Antipope Boniface VII in the Castel Sant'Angelo, where he died either from starvation or poison.	
Thomas Johnson	d. 1537	England	He and nine other Carthusian martyrs, who refused the Oath of Supremacy	
Daniil Kharms	1905–1942	Soviet Union	Poet, writer and dramatist who starved in prison during the siege of Leningrad.	
Nikolai Kletochnikov	1847-1883	Russian Empire	Revolutionary who died during a hunger strike.	
Julia Livilla	18–41	Roman Empire	Roman imperial princess, sister of Caligula, starved to death in her banishment on the orders of her uncle, the emperor Claudius.	
Liu Zongzhou	1578–1645	Ming Empire	Confucian scholar who starved himself to death following the fall of the Ming dynasty.	
Livilla	13 BC–31 AD	Roman Empire	Roman imperial princess, niece and daughter-in-law of Tiberius, starved to death by her mother Antonia Minor for her complicity in the murder of her husband Drusus Minor.	
Christopher McCandless	1968–1992	United States	American wanderer who starved to death in Alaska after a planned solo trip became fatal due to not being properly prepared.	
Terence MacSwiney	1879–1920	Ireland	Lord Mayor of Cork who died during a hunger strike while imprisoned in Brixton Prison.	
Feodosia Morozova	1632–1675	Russia	Russian noblewoman, one of the best-known partisans of the Old Believer movement.	
Scott Nearing	1883–1983	United States	American peace activist, economist and homesteader.	
Pausanias	d. 470 BC	Sparta	Spartan general	
Potti Sri Ramulu	1901–1952	India	Indian revolutionary of Andhra Pradesh, India for a separate state for Telugu speaking people.	
Hector Pitchforth	1887—1927	England	English trader, living as a hermit on Baffin Island.	
Vasily Rozanov	1856–1919	Russia	Russian philosopher	
Sayf al-Din Salar	1260s-1310	Mamluk Sultanate	Viceroy of the Mamluk sultan al-Nasir Muhammad who starved in prison.	
Bobby Sands	1954–1981	United Kingdom	He and nine other Irish republicans died during the 1981 Irish Hunger Strike.	
Carl Schlechter	1874–1918	Austria-Hungary	A leading Austrian chess master and theoretician (pneumonia also said to have been a factor).	
Robert Falcon Scott	1868–1912	United Kingdom	English Antarctic explorer who perished, along with four more, on their return trip from the South Pole	
Alexey Troitsky	1866–1942	Soviet Union	A leading Russian chess composer who starved to death during the Siege of Leningrad.	
Ugolino della Gherardesca	1220–1289	Florence	Italian nobleman, politician and naval commander who later became a figure in Dante's Divine Comedy.	
Wu of Liang	464–549	Liang Empire	Founding emperor of the Liang Dynasty.	
King Wuling of Zhao	d. 295 BC	Zhao	Ruler of Zhao during the Warring States period.	
Yang Ye	d. 986	Song Empire	Chinese general who served both the Northern Han and Song Dynasty.	
Empress Yang Zhi	259–292	Jin Dynasty	Second Empress Consort of Emperor Wu of Jin.	
Ye Mingchen	1807–1859	China	Chinese official who was a key figure in resisting British influence during the Opium Wars.	
Yuan Shu	d. 199	Han Empire	Chinese warlord who lived in the late Eastern Han dynasty.	
Simone Weil	1909-1943	France	French philosopher, mystic and political activist.	
Zhou Yafu	d. 143 BC	Han Empire	Chinese general best remembered for putting down the Rebellion of the Seven States.	

== See also ==
- List of deaths from anorexia nervosa
- Franklin expedition
- Great Irish Famine
- Little Ice Age
- Siege of Leningrad
- Sokushinbutsu
- 2005 Malawi food crisis
- 2008 Central Asia energy crisis
- Theresienstadt concentration camp
- Lists of people by cause of death
