= 68th meridian west =

Line of longitude

68th meridian west

The meridian 68° west of Greenwich is a line of longitude that extends from the North Pole across the Arctic Ocean, North America, the Atlantic Ocean, the Caribbean Sea, South America, the Pacific Ocean, the Southern Ocean, and Antarctica to the South Pole.

The 68th meridian west forms a great circle with the 112th meridian east.

== From Pole to Pole ==
Starting at the North Pole and heading south to the South Pole, the 68th meridian west passes through:

Co-ordinates	Country, territory or sea	Notes
90°0′N 68°0′W	Arctic Ocean	
83°10′N 68°0′W	Lincoln Sea	
82°58′N 68°0′W	Canada	Nunavut — Ellesmere Island
80°47′N 68°0′W	Nares Strait	
79°4′N 68°0′W	Greenland	Inglefield Land
76°3′N 68°0′W	Baffin Bay	
70°18′N 68°0′W	Canada	Nunavut — Baffin Island, Aulitivik Island, and Baffin Island again
62°12′N 68°0′W	Hudson Strait	
60°35′N 68°0′W	Canada	Nunavut — Akpatok Island
60°17′N 68°0′W	Ungava Bay	
58°34′N 68°0′W	Canada	Quebec
49°17′N 68°0′W	Saint Lawrence River	
48°40′N 68°0′W	Canada	Quebec; New Brunswick — from 48°0′N 68°0′W
47°13′N 68°0′W	United States	Maine
44°24′N 68°0′W	Atlantic Ocean	Passing just west of the island of Mona, Puerto Rico (at 18°5′N 67°56′W)
18°30′N 68°0′W	Caribbean Sea	Passing just east of the island of Bonaire, Netherlands (at 12°12′N 68°11′W); Passing just west of the Las Aves Archipelago, Venezuela (at 11°59′N 67°40′W)
10°29′N 68°0′W	Venezuela	Passing through Puerto Cabello at 10°29′N 68°0′W and Valencia, Carabobo at 10°11′N 68°0′W
6°12′N 68°0′W	Colombia	
1°45′N 68°0′W	Brazil	Amazonas; Acre — from 9°20′S 67°56′W
10°39′S 68°0′W	Bolivia	Passing just east of La Paz (at 16°29′S 68°8′W)
22°2′S 68°0′W	Chile	
24°18′S 68°0′W	Argentina	
50°3′S 68°0′W	Atlantic Ocean	
53°34′S 68°0′W	Argentina	Isla Grande de Tierra del Fuego
54°53′S 68°0′W	Chile	Navarino Island
55°14′S 68°0′W	Pacific Ocean	
55°32′S 68°0′W	Chile	Hoste Island
55°41′S 68°0′W	Pacific Ocean	Passing just west of Hermite Island, Chile (at 55°50′S 67°50′W)
60°0′S 68°0′W	Southern Ocean	
66°40′S 68°0′W	Antarctica	Adelaide Island — claimed by Argentina, Chile and the United Kingdom
67°26′S 68°0′W	Southern Ocean	Marguerite Bay
69°8′S 68°0′W	Antarctica	Territory claimed by Argentina, Chile and the United Kingdom

== See also ==
- 67th meridian west
- 69th meridian west
