= 65 =

65 may refer to:

- 65 (number), the natural number following 64 and preceding 66
- One of the years 65 BC, AD 65, 1965, 2065
- 65 (film), a 2023 American science fiction thriller film
- The atomic number of terbium, a chemical element
- A type of dish in Indian cuisine, such as Chicken 65, Gobi 65, or Paneer 65
- 65 Cybele, a main-belt asteroid
- The international calling code for Singapore

== See also ==
- 65th (disambiguation)
