= Hector Pitchforth =

English trader (1887–1927)

Hector James Henry Pitchforth (Inuktitut: ᐊᐅᓪᓚᖅ, Aullaq; (Note: The word "Aullaq" is the root of the verb "to leave" in Inuktitut, and was used by Inuit due to Pitchforth's habit of repeatedly asking people departing from his trading post if they were leaving.) 27 January 1887 — January 1927) was an English trader operating with the Sabellum Trading Company on Baffin Island in the Canadian Arctic. His death as a hermit led to newspaper attention as the "World's Loneliest Man."

== Biography ==
=== Early life ===
Hector James Henry Pitchforth was born 27 January 1887 in Meerut, India. His family was English and he was brought up primarily in Leeds, West Yorkshire, England. Though he became fully deaf at an early age, Pitchforth qualified as an engineer and served with the British Merchant Navy and Fishing Fleet during World War I.

=== Sabellum Trading Company ===
The Sabellum Trading Company was organized in 1912 by London-based ship-broker William Prowse Jobson, whose lack of Arctic experience led to him appointing James Mutch, a veteran whaler with more than fifty years of experience in Baffin Island and sufficient contacts with local Inuit to manage trade. Pitchforth joined in 1918, sailing for Baffin as assistant engineer aboard Erme, the company's small 72-ton wooden schooner which had made the voyage several times prior. Despite his experience with fishing vessels, he had no Arctic experience.

On 2 July 1918, only 240 mi (390 km) west of Ireland, Erme was boarded and burnt by the German submarine U-53. Against maritime convention where the captain goes down with the ship, Captain John Pearson was among the first men to make it to the lifeboats. Johnson and other crew members left Pitchford and Mutch on the burning vessel as they rowed away, but everybody aboard did survive.

In 1919 Jobson purchased a racing schooner called Vera to serve as the replacement for the destroyed Erme. She was only 63 tons and unsuited to Arctic navigation, spending an entire month stuck in the ice under the command of Captain Mowatt. Pitchford, reappointed the year later and granted the position of engineer, made a successful voyage, landing in Frobisher Bay and continuing up the Davis Strait to Cape Henry Kater on the east side of Baffin Island.

=== Arctic trading ===
Pitchforth stayed in Baffin for the winter of 1920–1921, making sledging voyages throughout the region. He returned to England aboard Vera in 1921. The vessel was crushed by ice and lost at Sisimiut during the 1922 voyage, and James Mutch, who had made the trading contacts with the inhabitants of Baffin retired, jeopardizing Sabellum's trade prospects. The Inuit employees of the company were unable to receive shipments, and the agent at Kivitoo had a mental breakdown during which he killed two people and was subsequently killed himself.

Facing these hardships, the company sent Pitchforth, one of the only remaining people in England with any company experience, to Kivitoo in 1923 aboard a new vessel called Rosie. Pitchforth's actual position within the company was unclear: the new operator of the Kivitoo station was an Inuk woman named Qaunnaq, and Pitchforth instead acted as a general representative, overseeing company affairs and reporting back to Jobson in the London home office. He travelled with Inuit by dog sled starting in December 1923. In January 1924 travelled to Cape Henry Kater and back, before embarking on a long journey in February, the coldest month of the year for the region. He visited a company outpost in Durban Harbour, then travelled to Padle Fiord, Kingait Fiord in Cumberland Sound, and Pangnirtung, where he met with rival traders from the Hudson's Bay Company and Inspector Wilcox of the Royal Canadian Mounted Police, both of which had only recently settled in Pangnirtung. He returned to Kivitoo on 25 April, having taken the same route. During the trip, which crossed over 2000 miles, Pitchforth began to believe the Inuit employees of the company were no longer loyal due to the fact that Mutch was no longer working there and that the Hudson's Bay Company provided competition.

The Sabellum home office sent a new employee, eighteen year old clerk Harry Wigglesworth, to Kivitoo aboard Rosie in the summer of 1924. Pitchforth dissuaded Wigglesworth from staying at Kivitoo, arguing the trade was declining, and had him relocated to Cape Henry Kater. The accommodations there were insufficient, and Wigglesworth returned to England, leaving Pitchforth at the declining Kivitoo.

=== Final years ===
Pitchforth's health started to decline. He was visited by the Canadian government ship Arctic later in 1924. Aboard was Wilcox, the RCMP inspector he had met in Pangnirtung. Wilcox wrote back to his superiors in Ottawa, noting that Pitchforth was nearly blind (from regular and residual snow-blindess) in addition to deaf, and that if he stayed in the Arctic he was likely to die. These concerns reached Jobson in London, who dismissed them, stating that Pitchforth was "endeavouring to magnify some hardship he had voluntarily undertaken." Despite this, Captain Pearson undertook the voyage to bring supplies to Pitchforth. In this 1925 voyage, Rosie was met with thick ice and unable to continue. Pearson fell ill and had to drop his supplies 300 miles south of the intended location. Naujarvik, an Inuk employee who had spent the winter in England and Scotland, made his way up the coast carrying the supplies for Pitchforth, but also fell ill. The company brought in essentially zero revenue that year, and Jobson lied to Pitchforth's family in England claiming he was making arrangements to aid him. In 1926, Jobson claimed in a letter to Pitchforth's relatives that "[...] we are not sending Rosie out this year, but we have made other arrangements [...]" when in fact the company had no plans to send any vessels to the Arctic.

That winter, Pitchforth's ability to hunt fresh meat was negatively impacted when disease spread among the hunting dogs, and no supplies had arrived preventing his trade with locals. As such he became inflicted with scurvy. The Inuit inhabitants of Kivitoo noted changes in Pitchforth's demeanour. He became increasingly paranoid and isolated, fearing rival traders, the Canadian police, and the Inuit, whom he became convinced were all out to kill him. This paranoia was likely fueled in part by the story of Robert S. Janes. Janes was a trader from Newfoundland who was killed by an Inuk in Cape Crauford, also on Baffin Island, which led to a prominent murder trial. Despite his near-blindness, Pitchford made regular 360 degree scans of his surroundings and built a stone wall around his house, leaving only the windows unobstructed so that he could see if anybody was approaching. During the construction of the wall, he slipped and fell, injuring his spine and his stomach when the heavy stone dropped on him. Despite his fear of the Inuit, he wrote regularly in his diary of the injuries he was sustaining because he did not want them falsely accused if he were to die.

As the year of 1926 progressed, Pitchforth's mental state worsened. He took all of his dishes, utensils, pans, cups and saucers, and went alone in his outboard motor boat to hide them. He passed on instructions on where to find these supplies, but his Inuk former friend Qilliq was not able to uncover the location. Pitchforth then went on to kill the puppies and several adult dogs used for travel and hunting. Because the Inuit needed these dogs for life in Kivitoo, many decided to flee and relocate at a new location. As they left, Pitchforth started shooting at them, though his poor eyesight resulted in him missing every shot. Once they left, he destroyed the shacks and his own boat. His former friend Qilliq and another man, Atakaalik, went to see how we was after some time, during which he ordered them away and refused to speak with them.

Pitchforth's last diary entry was on Christmas Day, 1926. He wrote: "Sky a bit clearer to the Southward, a beautiful ruddy flash tinted the ice and snow most beautifully. Not in the least like Xmas to myself and I feel so ill as to be nearly helpless." He was seen standing outside his shack by a woman passing through shortly after New Year's Day, but after that passersby found his shack snowed in. Inuit reported this to the Hudson's Bay Company manager at Clyde River, who in turn reported it to the RCMP. One officer, Constable Murray, was sent to investigate. Murray found his house locked from the inside, and had to break in, where he found Pitchforth dead in his bed, frozen upright in a sitting position. Among his only personal items were a large quantity of walrus tusks, which the RCMP allowed the Inuit to take. He also had fox pelts, many rifles and shotguns, including one frozen at his side, dirty clothing and dishes, and his diary. The police used the diary to determine the Inuit did not have a role in his death, and distributed his remaining other items among them.

Sabellum refused to pay Pitchforth's salary to his surviving kin unless they gave up his diary, which they believed contained records of furs he had hidden, something that could have returned profit to the company. No such information was found, and the company was effectively ended, leaving all trade in the area to the Hudson's Bay Company.

== Grave and burial ==
Pitchforth's body was taken by Constable Murray to Pond Inlet. For a time, the body was stored in a boat in a storage shed, still in an upright position, during which people who passed by would greet him. When summer came and his body thawed, he was buried. The site was a few kilometres west of Pond Inlet, beside that of Robert S. Janes. The graves were shallow and in thin sand. Over time, natural and human forces disturbed them, during which Pitchforth's coffin was damaged, rocks were removed, and the grave markers were switched. An all-terrain vehicle track eventually passed right by, which led to damage to the coffins before local volunteers erected a fence in 2003. Moving the graves was considered in the 1960s, but this was not undertaken. In 2004, after community requests and with the permission of the families, the bodies were exhumed and reburied in a new location with minimal threat from erosion and human activity. Pitchforth's family held a private service at the new site in July 2005.

== Media attention ==
Pitchforth was not well known in his life, but his story received newspaper coverage after he died. In 1927, a steamer called Beothic reached Pond Inlet and learned of his death. This was broadcast by the ship's radio and picked up by British newspapers, featuring it as a sensationalist story. He became known as the "World's Loneliest Man" and featured in stories including "Alone in the Arctic: Fate of a Gallant Englishman; Deserted and Starved in a Far Northern Island; Hector Pitchforth in War and Peace." His story led to unfavourable publicity for Sabellum, compounding with the company's major financial issues and contributing to their end.

== See also ==
- List of fur trading post and forts in North America
- List of people who died of starvation
- North American fur trade
