= 67 Squadron =

67 Squadron or 67th Squadron may refer to:

- No. 67 Squadron RAAF, a unit of the Royal Australian Air Force
- No. 67 Squadron RAF, a unit of the United Kingdom Royal Air Force
- 67th Special Operations Squadron, a unit of the United States Air Force
- 67th Fighter Squadron, a unit of the United States Air Force

== See also ==
- 67th Division (disambiguation)
- 67th Regiment (disambiguation)
