= Aulitivik Island =

Island in Nunavut, Canada

- Location within Nunavut Location within Canada

Geography
- Location: Northern Canada
- Coordinates: 69°37′N 68°00′W
- Archipelago: Arctic Archipelago
- Area: 209 km^{2} (81 sq mi)

Administration
- Canada
- Territory: Nunavut
- Region: Qikiqtaaluk

Demographics
- Population: Uninhabited

Aulitivik Island is an uninhabited island located in the Qikiqtaaluk Region of Nunavut, Canada. It is located in Baffin Bay's Isabella Bay by the Davis Strait. Situated north of Baffin Island's Henry Kater Peninsula, it is a member of the Arctic Archipelago. Aulitiving Island is 19.5 km (12.1 mi) to the east, with tiny Bearslide Island lying between them.

== Geography ==
It has an area of 209 km^{2} (81 sq mi).
