= 113th meridian east =

Line of longitude

113th meridian east

The meridian 113° east of Greenwich is a line of longitude that extends from the North Pole across the Arctic Ocean, Asia, the Indian Ocean, Australasia, the Southern Ocean, and Antarctica to the South Pole.

The 113th meridian east forms a great circle with the 67th meridian west.

== From pole to pole ==
Starting at the North Pole and heading south to the South Pole, the 113th meridian east passes through:

Co-ordinates	Country, territory or sea	Notes
90°0′N 113°0′E	Arctic Ocean	
79°10′N 113°0′E	Laptev Sea	
76°14′N 113°0′E	Russia	Krasnoyarsk Krai — Taymyr Peninsula
75°1′N 113°0′E	Laptev Sea	
74°31′N 113°0′E	Russia	Sakha Republic — Bolshoy Begichev Island
74°11′N 113°0′E	Laptev Sea	
73°54′N 113°0′E	Russia	Sakha Republic; Irkutsk Oblast — from 59°9′N 113°0′E; Republic of Buryatia — from 56°41′N 113°0′E; Zabaykalsky Krai — from 52°22′N 113°0′E
49°36′N 113°0′E	Mongolia	
44°50′N 113°0′E	People's Republic of China	Inner Mongolia; Shanxi – from 40°20′N 113°0′E; Henan – from 35°19′N 113°0′E; Hubei – from 32°23′N 113°0′E; Hunan – for about 7 km from 29°46′N 113°0′E; Hubei – from 29°41′N 113°0′E; Hunan – from 29°30′N 113°0′E, passing just east of Changsha (at 28°12′N 112°58′E); Guangdong – for about 13 km from 25°20′N 113°0′E; Hunan – for about 6 km from 25°10′N 113°0′E; Guangdong – for about 9 km from 25°9′N 113°0′E; Hunan – for about 4 km from 25°0′N 113°0′E; Guangdong – from 24°56′N 113°0′E
21°56′N 113°0′E	South China Sea	Passing through the disputed Paracel Islands; Passing through the disputed Spratly Islands
3°10′N 113°0′E	Malaysia	Sarawak – on the island of Borneo
1°34′N 113°0′E	Indonesia	West Kalimantan – on the island of Borneo – for about 13 km
1°27′N 113°0′E	Malaysia	Sarawak – on the island of Borneo, for about 5 km
1°24′N 113°0′E	Indonesia	Island of Borneo; West Kalimantan; Central Kalimantan
3°10′S 113°0′E	Java Sea	
6°53′S 113°0′E	Indonesia	Island of Madura
7°13′S 113°0′E	Madura Strait	
7°39′S 113°0′E	Indonesia	Island of Java
8°19′S 113°0′E	Indian Ocean	Passing just west of Bernier Island (at 24°59′S 113°7′E) and Dorre Island (at 25°14′S 113°3′E), Western Australia, Australia
25°31′S 113°0′E	Australia	Western Australia – Dirk Hartog Island
25°51′S 113°0′E	Indian Ocean	
60°0′S 113°0′E	Southern Ocean	
65°44′S 113°0′E	Antarctica	Australian Antarctic Territory, claimed by Australia

Next westward: 112th meridian east	113th meridian east forms a great circle with 67th meridian west	Next eastward: 114th meridian east
