= 114th meridian east =

Line of longitude

114th meridian east (interactive map)

The meridian 114° east of Greenwich is a line of longitude that extends from the North Pole across the Arctic Ocean, Asia, the Indian Ocean, Australasia, the Southern Ocean, and Antarctica to the South Pole.

The 114th meridian east forms a great circle with the 66th meridian west.

== From Pole to Pole ==
Starting at the North Pole and heading south to the South Pole, the 114th meridian east passes through:

Co-ordinates	Country, territory or sea	Notes
90°0′N 114°0′E	Arctic Ocean	
79°3′N 114°0′E	Laptev Sea	Passing just east of the Taymyr Peninsula, Krasnoyarsk Krai, Russia (at 75°50′N 113°55′E)
73°34′N 114°0′E	Russia	Sakha Republic; Irkutsk Oblast — from 59°45′N 114°0′E; Republic of Buryatia — from 56°36′N 114°0′E; Zabaykalsky Krai — from 53°43′N 114°0′E; Republic of Buryatia — from 53°15′N 114°0′E; Zabaykalsky Krai — from 52°38′N 114°0′E
50°10′N 114°0′E	Mongolia	
44°56′N 114°0′E	China	Inner Mongolia; Hebei – from 41°29′N 114°0′E; Inner Mongolia – from 40°58′N 114°0′E; Shanxi – from 40°29′N 114°0′E; Hebei − for about 14 km from 40°5′N 114°0′E; Shanxi – from 40°0′N 114°0′E; Hebei – from 39°5′N 114°0′E; Shanxi – from 37°41′N 114°0′E; Hebei – from 37°25′N 114°0′E; Henan – from 36°21′N 114°0′E; Hubei – from 31°45′N 114°0′E; Jiangxi − for about 20 km from 29°7′N 114°0′E; Hunan – from 28°54′N 114°0′E; Jiangxi – from 28°2′N 114°0′E; Hunan – from 26°32′N 114°0′E; Jiangxi − from 25°51′N 114°0′E; Guangdong − from 25°21′N 114°0′E
22°31′N 114°0′E	Hong Kong	Northwestern New Territories and Lantau: Tin Shui Wai, So Kwun Wat, Siu Ho Wan, Mui Wo, and the Chi Ma Wan peninsula. Passes directly through Lo Fu Tau.
22°12′N 114°0′E	South China Sea	Passing through the disputed Spratly Islands
4°35′N 114°0′E	Malaysia	Sarawak – on the island of Borneo
1°27′N 114°0′E	Indonesia	Island of Borneo; West Kalimantan; East Kalimantan; Central Kalimantan
3°22′S 114°0′E	Java Sea	
6°53′S 114°0′E	Indonesia	Island of Madura
7°6′S 114°0′E	Madura Strait	
7°38′S 114°0′E	Indonesia	Island of Java
8°36′S 114°0′E	Indian Ocean	
21°53′S 114°0′E	Australia	Western Australia
25°33′S 114°0′E	Shark Bay	
26°22′S 114°0′E	Australia	Western Australia
27°18′S 114°0′E	Indian Ocean	
60°0′S 114°0′E	Southern Ocean	
66°3′S 114°0′E	Antarctica	Australian Antarctic Territory, claimed by Australia

Next westward: 113th meridian east	114th meridian east forms a great circle with 66th meridian west	Next eastward: 115th meridian east
