= 65 Squadron =

65 Squadron or 65th Squadron may refer to:

- No. 65 Squadron RAF, a unit of the United Kingdom Royal Air Force
- No. 65 Squadron RAAF, a unit of the Royal Australian Air Force
- 65th Aggressor Squadron, a unit of the United States Air Force
- 65th Airlift Squadron, a unit of the United States Air Force

== See also ==
- 65th Division (disambiguation)
- 65th Regiment (disambiguation)
