= 66th meridian west =

Line of longitude

66th meridian west

The meridian 66° west of Greenwich is a line of longitude that extends from the North Pole across the Arctic Ocean, North America, the Atlantic Ocean, the Caribbean Sea, South America, the Southern Ocean, and Antarctica to the South Pole.

The 66th meridian west forms a great circle with the 114th meridian east.

== From Pole to Pole ==
Starting at the North Pole and heading south to the South Pole, the 66th meridian west passes through:

Co-ordinates	Country, territory or sea	Notes
90°0′N 66°0′W	Arctic Ocean	
83°15′N 66°0′W	Lincoln Sea	
82°50′N 66°0′W	Canada	Nunavut — Ellesmere Island
81°13′N 66°0′W	Nares Strait	
80°37′N 66°0′W	Greenland	Washington Land
80°0′N 66°0′W	Nares Strait	Kane Basin
79°8′N 66°0′W	Greenland	Inglefield Land
76°2′N 66°0′W	Baffin Bay	
70°0′N 66°0′W	Davis Strait	
68°1′N 66°0′W	Canada	Nunavut — Cumberland Peninsula, Baffin Island
66°6′N 66°0′W	Davis Strait	Cumberland Sound
64°50′N 66°0′W	Canada	Nunavut — Hall Peninsula, Baffin Island
62°57′N 66°0′W	Frobisher Bay	
62°15′N 66°0′W	Canada	Nunavut — Meta Incognita Peninsula, Baffin Island
61°52′N 66°0′W	Hudson Strait	
60°30′N 66°0′W	Ungava Bay	
58°58′N 66°0′W	Canada	Quebec; Newfoundland and Labrador — Labrador, from 54°56′N 66°0′W; Quebec — from 52°4′N 66°0′W
50°16′N 66°0′W	Gulf of Saint Lawrence	
49°13′N 66°0′W	Canada	Quebec — Gaspé Peninsula
48°9′N 66°0′W	Chaleur Bay	
47°55′N 66°0′W	Canada	New Brunswick — passing just east of Saint John at 45°17'N
45°13′N 66°0′W	Bay of Fundy	
44°35′N 66°0′W	Canada	Nova Scotia
43°43′N 66°0′W	Atlantic Ocean	
18°27′N 66°0′W	Puerto Rico	
17°58′N 66°0′W	Caribbean Sea	Passing just east of the island of La Orchila, Venezuela (at 11°52′N 66°5′W)
10°24′N 66°0′W	Venezuela	
0°48′N 66°0′W	Brazil	Amazonas; Rondônia — from 9°24′S 66°0′W
9°48′S 66°0′W	Bolivia	
21°55′S 66°0′W	Argentina	
45°0′S 66°0′W	Atlantic Ocean	San Jorge Gulf
47°5′S 66°0′W	Argentina	
48°6′S 66°0′W	Atlantic Ocean	
54°37′S 66°0′W	Argentina	Isla Grande de Tierra del Fuego
54°57′S 66°0′W	Atlantic Ocean	
60°0′S 66°0′W	Southern Ocean	
65°33′S 66°0′W	Antarctica	Renaud Island — claimed by Argentina, Chile and the United Kingdom
65°54′S 66°0′W	Southern Ocean	
66°39′S 66°0′W	Antarctica	Claimed by Argentina, Chile and the United Kingdom

== See also ==
- 65th meridian west
- 67th meridian west
