= 115th meridian east =

Line of longitude

115th meridian east (interactive map)

The meridian 115° east of Greenwich is a line of longitude that extends from the North Pole across the Arctic Ocean, Asia, the Indian Ocean, Australasia, the Southern Ocean, and Antarctica to the South Pole.

The 115th meridian east forms a great circle with the 65th meridian west.

Between Australia and the 60th parallel south it forms the western boundary of the South Pacific Nuclear-Weapon-Free Zone.

== From Pole to Pole ==
Starting at the North Pole and heading south to the South Pole, the 115th meridian east passes through:

Co-ordinates	Country, territory or sea	Notes
90°0′N 115°0′E	Arctic Ocean	
78°56′N 115°0′E	Laptev Sea	
73°38′N 115°0′E	Russia	Sakha Republic; Irkutsk Oblast — from 60°14′N 115°0′E; Republic of Buryatia — from 56°58′N 115°0′E; Zabaykalsky Krai — from 54°2′N 115°0′E
50°11′N 115°0′E	Mongolia	
45°24′N 115°0′E	People's Republic of China	Inner Mongolia; Hebei – from 41°34′N 115°0′E; Henan – from 36°3′N 115°0′E; Shandong – from 35°16′N 115°0′E; Henan – from 34°57′N 115°0′E; Anhui – for about 18 km from 33°3′N 115°0′E; Henan – from 32°52′N 115°0′E; Hubei – from 31°28′N 115°0′E; Jiangxi – from 29°32′N 115°0′E; Guangdong – from 24°41′N 115°0′E
22°42′N 115°0′E	South China Sea	Passing through the disputed Spratly Islands
5°2′N 115°0′E	Brunei	On the island of Borneo, near Bandar Seri Begawan
4°53′N 115°0′E	Malaysia	Sarawak - on the island of Borneo
2°22′N 115°0′E	Indonesia	On the island of Borneo; North Kalimantan; East Kalimantan; Central Kalimantan; South Kalimantan
4°1′S 115°0′E	Java Sea	
7°17′S 115°0′E	Bali Sea	
8°10′S 115°0′E	Indonesia	Island of Bali
8°32′S 115°0′E	Indian Ocean	
21°27′S 115°0′E	Australia	Western Australia – Thevenard Island
21°28′S 115°0′E	Indian Ocean	
21°41′S 115°0′E	Australia	Western Australia
30°14′S 115°0′E	Indian Ocean	
33°40′S 115°0′E	Australia	Western Australia
34°6′S 115°0′E	Indian Ocean	
60°0′S 115°0′E	Southern Ocean	
66°28′S 115°0′E	Antarctica	Australian Antarctic Territory, claimed by Australia

== See also ==
- 114th meridian east
- 116th meridian east
