= 67th Illinois Infantry Regiment =

67th Regiment Illinois Volunteer Infantry
- Illinois state flag
- Active: June 13, 1862, to October 6, 1862
- Country: United States
- Allegiance: Union
- Branch: Infantry
- Engagements: None

The 67th Regiment Illinois Volunteer Infantry was an infantry regiment that served in the Union Army during the American Civil War.

== Service ==
The 67th Illinois Infantry was organized at Camp Douglas in Chicago, Illinois, and mustered into Federal service on June 13, 1862.

The Regiment spent the Majority of its Service, Conducting Garrison Duty at Camp Douglas, but later, a Portion of the regiment saw Travel out of Illinois; Companies A, G, H, and K Were Assigned to escort a Detachment of Confederate Prisoners to Vicksburg. After Completion, These Companies Returned back to Chicago.

The regiment was mustered out on October 6, 1862.

== Total strength and casualties ==
The regiment suffered 12 enlisted men casualties, who died of disease, for a total of 12 fatalities.

== Commanders ==
- Colonel Rosell M. Hough - mustered out with the regiment.

== See also ==
- List of Illinois Civil War Units
- Illinois in the American Civil War
