= 66th meridian east =

Line of longitude

66th meridian east

The meridian 66° east of Greenwich is a line of longitude that extends from the North Pole across the Arctic Ocean, Europe, Asia, the Indian Ocean, the Southern Ocean, and Antarctica to the South Pole.

The 66th meridian east forms a great circle with the 114th meridian west.

== From Pole to Pole ==
Starting at the North Pole and heading south to the South Pole, the 66th meridian east passes through:

Co-ordinates	Country, territory or sea	Notes
90°0′N 66°0′E	Arctic Ocean	Passing just east of Graham Bell Island, Franz Josef Land, Russia
81°0′N 66°0′E	Barents Sea	
76°44′N 66°0′E	Russia	Severny Island, Novaya Zemlya
75°56′N 66°0′E	Kara Sea	
69°5′N 66°0′E	Russia	
54°37′N 66°0′E	Kazakhstan	
42°56′N 66°0′E	Uzbekistan	
38°13′N 66°0′E	Turkmenistan	
37°27′N 66°0′E	Afghanistan	
29°47′N 66°0′E	Pakistan	Balochistan
25°25′N 66°0′E	Indian Ocean	
60°0′S 66°0′E	Southern Ocean	
67°43′S 66°0′E	Antarctica	Australian Antarctic Territory, claimed by Australia

== See also ==
- 65th meridian east
- 67th meridian east
