= 111th Brigade =

111th Brigade may refer to:

== British India ==
- 111th Indian Infantry Brigade

== Germany ==
- 111th Panzer Brigade

== Libya ==
- 111th Brigade Majhfal

== Pakistan ==
- 111th Infantry Brigade (Pakistan)

== Ukraine ==
- 111th Territorial Defense Brigade

== United Kingdom ==
- 111th Brigade (United Kingdom)

== United States ==
- 111th Engineer Brigade
- 111th Military Intelligence Brigade
- 111th Sustainment Brigade

== Yugoslavia ==
- 111th Aviation Brigade

== See also ==
- 111th Division (disambiguation)
- 111th Regiment (disambiguation)
