= 67th Street =

67th Street may refer to:

- 67th Street (Manhattan), New York City
- 67th Street station, IRT Third Avenue Line, New York City
- 67th Street station (Illinois), Metra Electric District, Chicago
