= 65th Infantry Regiment (PA) =

65th Infantry (Provisional) Regiment (PA)
- Active: January 1942 – May 1942
- Disbanded: May 16, 1942
- Countries: United States of America; Commonwealth of the Philippines
- Allegiance: United States Army; Philippine Commonwealth Army
- Branch: Army
- Type: Infantry
- Role: Light Infantry
- Size: 1,000 ~ 1,500
- Part of: 61st Infantry Division
- Garrison/HQ: Cabatuan, Iloilo
- Equipment: M1917 Enfield Rifles, M1923 Thompson Submachineguns, Bolo
- Engagements: Japanese Invasion of Panay

Commanders
- Notable commanders: Lieutenant Colonel Leopoldo Relunia LCol Juan C. Quimbo; LCol. Amos Francia LCol Grino

65th Infantry (Provisional) Regiment, is a reserve unit of Philippine Commonwealth Army under 61st Infantry Division to cover Panay Island. It was organized entirely with trainees and recruits from Panay Island. It fought during the Invasion of the Japanese of Panay Island and resorted to guerilla warfare after the 61st Division surrendered on May 16, 1942.

== Background ==
After General Sharp moved his headquarters in Mindanao, he ordered bulked of his units to Mindanao as well. 61st Division units was ordered to release 61st Infantry under Colonel Mitchell based in Negros, 62nd Infantry under Colonel Thayer, and 61st Field Artillery under Colonel Tarkington and transfer to Mindanao via Negros. This leaving only one regiment in the island, General Bradford Chynoweth commander of 61st Division without delay, organized 2 new regiments out from trainees and new recruits in the island.

Initially it was named 61st Provisional Infantry and 62nd Provisional Infantry to replace the previous regiments who left the island. However, in order not to create confusion it was renamed to 65th Infantry (Provisional) initially under Lieutenant Colonel Juan Quimbo former Division Chief of Staff,. After reorganization of the division brought Lieutenant Amos Francia.

The regiment participated in the Operation Baus Au initiated by General Chynoweth before he was ordered to assumed command of the new Visayas Force base in Cebu. The command of the island was passed on to Colonel Albert Christie as commander of Panay Force and 61st Infantry Division.

=== Japanese Invasion ===
On April 18, 1942, two days after the Kawaguchi Detachment invaded Cebu, the Kawamura detachment invaded Panay in three different landing zones. 64th Infantry was assigned to Antique Province to thwart any Japanese landings but Naval and Air bombardment prevented them to do so due to absence of a single artillery gun in the Island. They retreated inland and resorted to ambuscades and raids to Japanese warehouses inflicting heavy casualties to the Japanese. However, this did not prevent Kawamura Detachment turnover Panay to 10th Independent Garrison to leave for Mindanao.

On May 11, 1942, order came from Mindanao to surrender at daybreak, Lieutenant Colonel Allen Thayer a representative from General Sharp from Visayas-Mindanao Force Headquarters in Mindanao to enforce the order. On May 12, 1942, Colonel Christie surrendered his Division to the Japanese forces in Cabatuan, Iloilo. Lieutenant Colonel Leopoldo Relunia commander of 61st Engineers and concurrent commander of 65th Provisional Infantry, continued the fight together with Macario Peralta Jr as commander of the island known as Free Panay Guerilla Forces.
