= 67th Brigade =

67th Brigade may refer to:

== Soviet Union ==
- 67th Tank Brigade

== Ukraine ==
- 67th Mechanized Brigade (Ukraine)

== United Kingdom ==
- 67th Anti-Aircraft Brigade
- 67th Brigade (United Kingdom)
- 67th Brigade, Royal Field Artillery, British Army unit during World War I
- 67th (South Midland) Brigade, Royal Field Artillery, British Army unit after World War I
- 67th (York & Lancaster Regiment) Anti-Aircraft Brigade, Royal Artillery

== United States ==
- 67th Maneuver Enhancement Brigade

== See also ==
- 67th Division (disambiguation)
- 67th Regiment (disambiguation)
