= 65th Anti-Aircraft Artillery Division =

- Active: September 1943–c. 1950s
- Country: Soviet Union
- Branch: Red Army (later Soviet Army)
- Type: Anti-Aircraft Artillery
- Engagements: World War II
- Decorations: Order of Kutuzov 2nd class; Order of Alexander Nevsky
- Battle honours: Pomerania

The 65th Anti-Aircraft Artillery Division (Russian: 65-я зенитная артиллерийская дивизия) was an anti-aircraft artillery division of the Soviet Union's Red Army (later the Soviet Army) during World War II and the early postwar period.

It was formed in September 1943 and spent the next several months training in the Moscow Military District. In the spring of 1944, it provided air defense to facilities in the rear of the front, and from the summer fought in the fighting for the Narew bridgehead. In early 1945 the division fought in the East Prussian Offensive and the East Pomeranian Offensive before providing air defense for the Oder crossing in April. For its actions, the 65th was awarded the honorific Pomerania, the Order of Kutuzov, and the Order of Alexander Nevsky. It was disbanded after the end of the war by the end of the 1950s.

== World War II ==
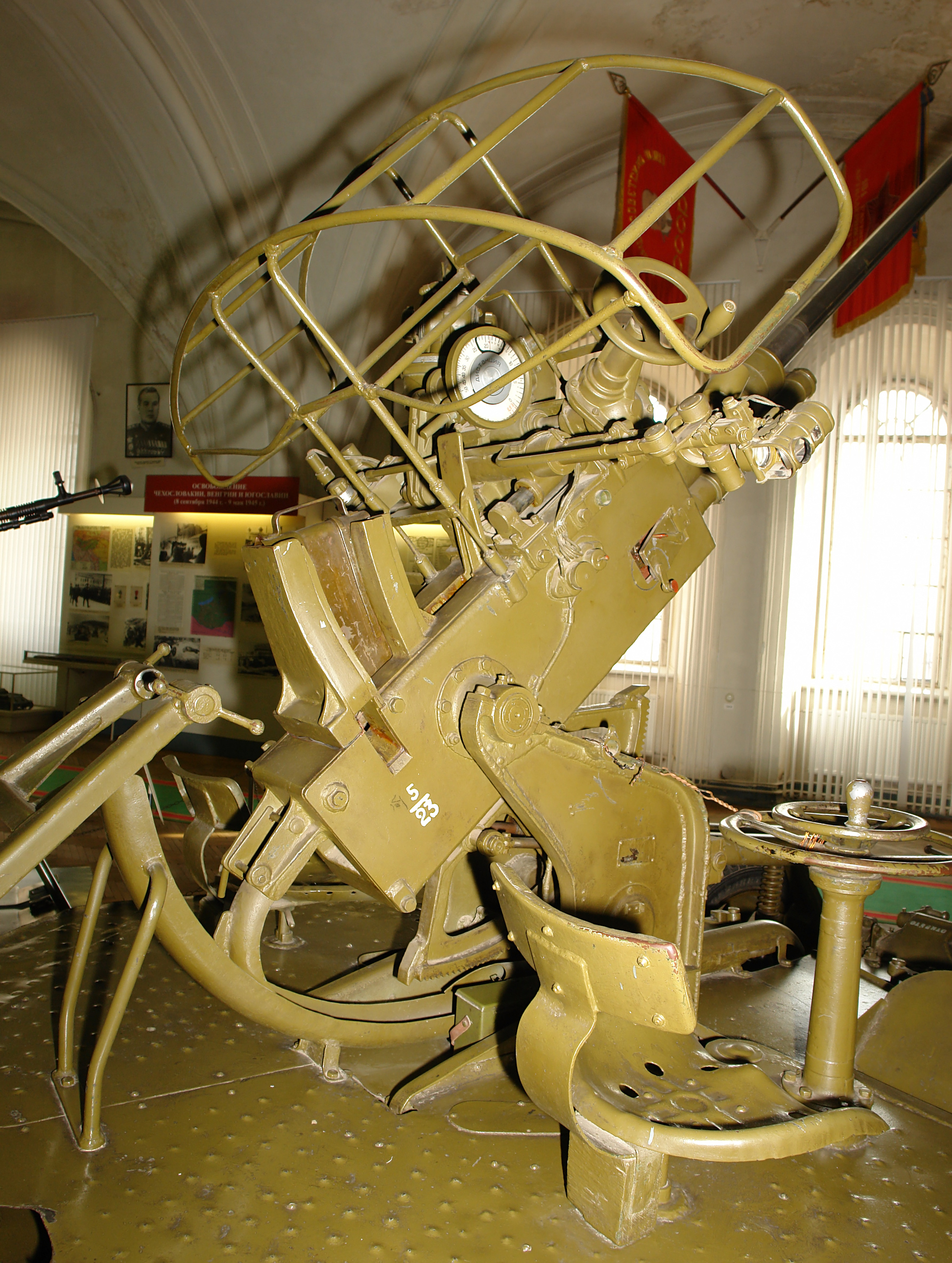
A 37 mm AA gun of the type used by the division during World War II

The 65th Anti-Aircraft Artillery Division of the Reserve of the Supreme High Command (RVGK) began forming in late September 1943 at the Moscow Anti-Aircraft Artillery Training Camp in the military townlet of Aminiyevo. Lieutenant Colonel (promoted to colonel on 17 November) Alexander Sakin was assigned as commander on 28 September; he led the division for the rest of the war. It included the 1980th, 1984th, 1988th, and the 1992nd Anti-Aircraft Artillery Regiments, formed as part of the division, and was part of the Moscow Military District. The 65th finished forming on 30 October. It remained there, conducting training, for the next several months.

In February 1944, the division was transferred to the RVGK. It was directly subordinated to the 2nd Belorussian Front in March, but transferred to the 1st Belorussian Front in April. During April and May 1944, the division provided air defense for the railroad stations at Sarny and Manevychi, as well as facilities of the 1st Belorussian Front. In difficult conditions the 65th claimed to have downed 22 enemy aircraft conducting night raids. It then rejoined the 2nd Belorussian Front, with which it served for the rest of the war. The division fought in the fighting to capture and expanded the Narew bridgehead from the summer onwards. From September it was part of the 48th Army.

Between 14 January and 10 February 1945, it served with the 48th Army in the East Prussian Offensive, with elements supporting the 8th Mechanized Corps' breakthrough of German lines. The 65th claimed 25 enemy aircraft downed during the offensive, as well as three ammunition and fuel depots, 20 halftracks and automobiles, eleven pillboxes, 45 wagons destroyed, and up to 400 enemy soldiers killed when it used its guns for artillery bombardments and counterattacks. Additionally, the division was credited with suppressing the fire of eight artillery and mortar batteries and capturing up to 30 settlements without the support of infantry units. During the offensive, it advanced into the cities of Mława and Osterode.

The division was transferred to the 19th Army in February. In the subsequent East Pomeranian Offensive, during the elimination of German troops around Danzig, the 65th claimed ten German aircraft downed, more than 1,500 German soldiers killed, and up to 50 vehicles with cargo destroyed. For its "successful completion of command tasks" at Danzig, the 65th received the Order of Kutuzov, 2nd class, on 17 May. From April, initially as part of the 19th Army, and then directly subordinated to the front, the division provided air defense for the crossing of the Oder during the Battle of Berlin. For "successful completion of command tasks", the division received the honorific Pomerania and was awarded the Order of Alexander Nevsky.

== Postwar ==
Following the end of the war, the division became part of the Northern Group of Forces. Sakin transferred to command another anti-aircraft artillery division in December 1946, and was replaced by Colonel Nikolay Kaminsky in January 1947, still part of the Northern Group of Forces. Kaminsky was transferred in September 1949. The division was among those anti-aircraft artillery divisions disbanded without being converted into another unit by the end of the 1950s.
