= 67th meridian west =

Line of longitude

67th meridian west (interactive map)

The meridian 67° west of Greenwich is a line of longitude that extends from the North Pole across the Arctic Ocean, North America, the Atlantic Ocean, the Caribbean Sea, South America, the Southern Ocean, and Antarctica to the South Pole.

The 67th meridian west forms a great circle with the 113th meridian east.

== From Pole to Pole ==
Starting at the North Pole and heading south to the South Pole, the 67th meridian west passes through:

Co-ordinates	Country, territory or sea	Notes
90°0′N 67°0′W	Arctic Ocean	
83°12′N 67°0′W	Lincoln Sea	
82°57′N 67°0′W	Canada	Nunavut — Ellesmere Island
80°58′N 67°0′W	Nares Strait	
80°24′N 67°0′W	Greenland	Washington Land
80°3′N 67°0′W	Nares Strait	Kane Basin
79°9′N 67°0′W	Greenland	Inglefield Land
75°59′N 67°0′W	Baffin Bay	
70°0′N 67°0′W	Davis Strait	
69°24′N 67°0′W	Canada	Nunavut — Henry Kater Peninsula, Baffin Island
69°11′N 67°0′W	Davis Strait	
68°27′N 67°0′W	Canada	Nunavut — Cumberland Peninsula, Baffin Island
66°21′N 67°0′W	Cumberland Sound	
65°28′N 67°0′W	Canada	Nunavut — Hall Peninsula, Baffin Island
63°14′N 67°0′W	Frobisher Bay	
63°6′N 67°0′W	Canada	Nunavut — Chase Island
63°5′N 67°0′W	Frobisher Bay	
62°44′N 67°0′W	Canada	Nunavut — Meta Incognita Peninsula, Baffin Island
62°2′N 67°0′W	Hudson Strait	
60°30′N 67°0′W	Ungava Bay	
58°27′N 67°0′W	Canada	Quebec; Newfoundland and Labrador — Labrador, from 54°51′N 67°0′W; Quebec — from 53°28′N 67°0′W; Newfoundland and Labrador — Labrador, from 53°22′N 67°0′W; Quebec — from 53°19′N 67°0′W; Newfoundland and Labrador — Labrador, from 53°10′N 67°0′W; Quebec — from 53°8′N 67°0′W; Newfoundland and Labrador — Labrador, from 53°6′N 67°0′W; Quebec — from 52°49′N 67°0′W
49°51′N 67°0′W	Saint Lawrence River	
48°59′N 67°0′W	Canada	Quebec — Bas-Saint-Laurent; New Brunswick — from 47°54′N 67°0′W
45°9′N 67°0′W	Passamaquoddy Bay	
45°0′N 67°0′W	Canada	New Brunswick — Deer Island
44°56′N 67°0′W	United States	Maine — Moose Island and mainland
44°47′N 67°0′W	Atlantic Ocean	Passing just west of Grand Manan Island, New Brunswick, Canada (at 44°36′N 66°55′W)
18°30′N 67°0′W	Puerto Rico	
17°58′N 67°0′W	Caribbean Sea	Passing just west of the Los Roques archipelago, Venezuela (at 11°50′N 66°57′W)
10°36′N 67°0′W	Venezuela	Passing just west of Caracas (at 10°29′N 66°55′W)
1°42′N 67°0′W	Colombia	
1°11′N 67°0′W	Brazil	Amazonas; Acre — from 9°45′S 67°0′W
10°11′S 67°0′W	Bolivia	
22°32′S 67°0′W	Argentina	
22°58′S 67°0′W	Chile	For about 14 km
23°6′S 67°0′W	Argentina	
45°18′S 67°0′W	Atlantic Ocean	San Jorge Gulf
46°49′S 67°0′W	Argentina	
48°37′S 67°0′W	Atlantic Ocean	
54°10′S 67°0′W	Argentina	Isla Grande de Tierra del Fuego
54°58′S 67°0′W	Chile	Picton Island and Lennox Island
55°21′S 67°0′W	Atlantic Ocean	Passing just east of Deceit Island, Chile (at 55°54′S 67°2′W)
60°0′S 67°0′W	Southern Ocean	
66°55′S 67°0′W	Antarctica	Territory claimed by Argentina, Chile and the United Kingdom

== See also ==
- 66th meridian west
- 68th meridian west
