= 111 Squadron PN =

111 Squadron
- ۱۱۱ سکواڈرن
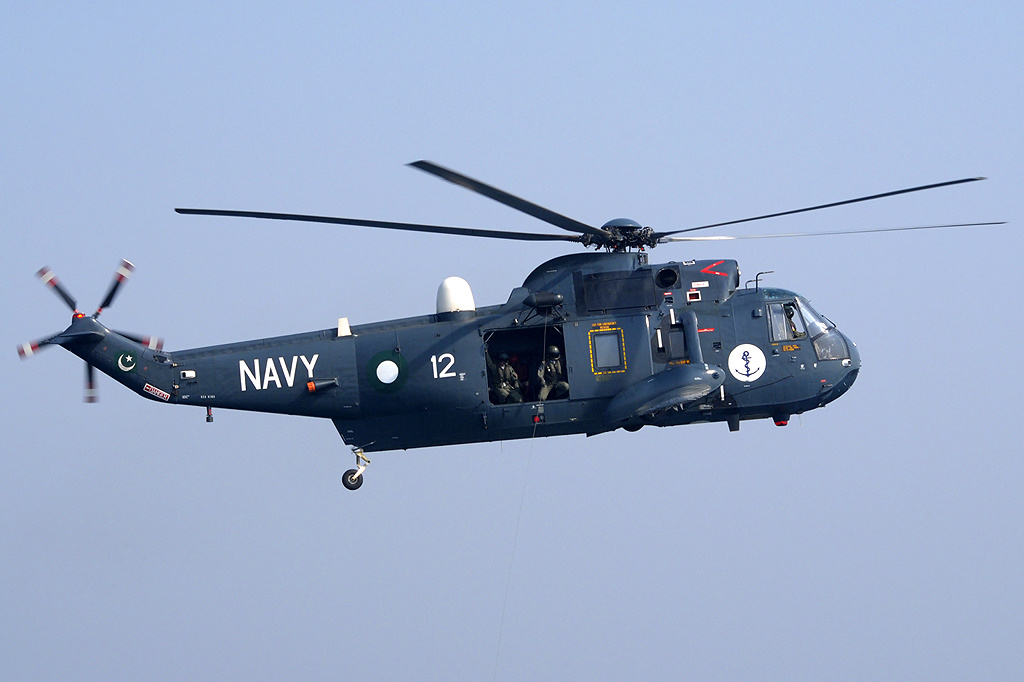
- A Sea King Mk. 45 of the 111 Squadron conducting rescue exercises at international waters in 2010.
- Active: Since 1974 (51 years, 5 months)
- Country: Pakistan
- Allegiance: Pakistan Navy
- Branch: Pakistan Naval Air Arm
- Type: Squadron
- Role: Anti-submarine warfare & Anti-surface warfare
- Station: PNS Mehran
- Nickname: Sharks
- Mottos: Search and Strike
- Mascot: A Shark
- Anniversaries: 8 September (Navy day)
- Helicopters: Westland Sea King (multiple variants)

111 ASW Squadron also known by their nickname the Sharks is a helicopter squadron of the Pakistan Naval Air Arm. It is based at PNS Mehran and operates Westland Sea King helicopters deployed aboard various ships of the Pakistan Navy. The squadron was established in September 1974 at its home base as an Anti-submarine warfare squadron.

== History ==
On 28 September 1974, Pakistan inducted Sea King Mk. 45/45A helicopters as part of modernization project for the navy which resulted in the 111 ASW Squadron being established. These Sea kings were capable of Anti-submarine & Anti-surface warfare which could fire AM-39 Exocet anti-ship missiles, Mk. 46 Torpedoes and depth charges.

Other than its primary wartime role, the squadron is also assigned secondary duties such as SAR, MEDEVAC, HVBSS, Para Drop and VVIP/Passenger transport. In 2021, the squadron's fleet was enlarged with acquisitions of 10 ex-Qatari Sea Kings which included 7 Mk.3A ASW/ASV capable Sea kings and 3 Mk. 2A Commando variants.

=== Operational history ===
The squadron has taken part in various military exercises and operations throughout the years. It has conducted several recue operations during the 2005 Kashmir earthquake and 2010 floods.

In the 2020 Karachi floods, the squadron's Sea Kings conducted 30 humanitarian relief and rescue missions in which more than 450 people were rescued from flooded areas.

== See also ==
- HSC-5
