= 112th meridian east =

Line of longitude

112th meridian east

The meridian 112° east of Greenwich is a line of longitude that extends from the North Pole across the Arctic Ocean, Asia, the Indian Ocean, the Southern Ocean, and Antarctica to the South Pole.

The 112th meridian east forms a great circle with the 68th meridian west.

== From Pole to Pole ==
Starting at the North Pole and heading south to the South Pole, the 112th meridian east passes through:

Co-ordinates	Country, territory or sea	Notes
90°0′N 112°0′E	Arctic Ocean	
79°17′N 112°0′E	Laptev Sea	
76°34′N 112°0′E	Russia	Krasnoyarsk Krai — Taymyr Peninsula
74°46′N 112°0′E	Laptev Sea	
74°31′N 112°0′E	Russia	Sakha Republic — Bolshoy Begichev Island
74°12′N 112°0′E	Laptev Sea	
73°43′N 112°0′E	Russia	Sakha Republic; Krasnoyarsk Krai — from 71°24′N 112°0′E; Sakha Republic — from 71°2′N 112°0′E; Irkutsk Oblast — from 59°22′N 112°0′E; Republic of Buryatia — from 56°57′N 112°0′E; Zabaykalsky Krai — from 52°13′N 112°0′E
49°25′N 112°0′E	Mongolia	
45°5′N 112°0′E	People's Republic of China	Inner Mongolia
43°49′N 112°0′E	Mongolia	For about 6 km
43°46′N 112°0′E	People's Republic of China	Inner Mongolia; Shanxi – from 39°50′N 112°0′E; Henan – from 35°4′N 112°0′E; Hubei – from 32°25′N 112°0′E; Hunan – from 29°45′N 112°0′E; Guangxi – for about 3 km from 24°45′N 112°0′E; Guangdong – from 24°44′N 112°0′E; Guangxi - for about 6 km from 24°33′N 112°0′E; Guangdong - for about 5 km from 24°29′N 112°0′E; Guangxi – from 24°27′N 112°0′E; Guangdong – from 24°17′N 112°0′E
21°45′N 112°0′E	South China Sea	
21°39′N 112°0′E	People's Republic of China	Guangdong – Hailing Island
21°37′N 112°0′E	South China Sea	Passing through the disputed Paracel Islands; Passing through the disputed Spratly Islands
2°54′N 112°0′E	Malaysia	Sarawak – on the island of Borneo
1°7′N 112°0′E	Indonesia	Island of Borneo; West Kalimantan; Central Kalimantan
3°29′S 112°0′E	Java Sea	
6°48′S 112°0′E	Indonesia	Island of Java
8°18′S 112°0′E	Indian Ocean	
60°0′S 112°0′E	Southern Ocean	
65°54′S 112°0′E	Antarctica	Australian Antarctic Territory, claimed by Australia

Next westward: 111th meridian east	112th meridian east forms a great circle with 68th meridian west	Next eastward: 113th meridian east
