= 6/7 =

6/7 may refer to:

- June 7 (month-day date notation)
- July 6 (day-month date notation)
- 6-7, an internet meme
- 6/7 (number), a fraction
