= 65th Street =

65th Street may refer to:

== New York City ==
- 65th Street (IRT Second Avenue Line)
- 65th Street (IND Queens Boulevard Line)
- 65th Street Terminal (BMT Fifth Avenue Line)

== Cleveland ==
- West 65th–Lorain station

== See also ==
- 65th Street Yard
