= 69th meridian west =

Line of longitude

69th meridian west

The meridian 69° west of Greenwich is a line of longitude that extends from the North Pole across the Arctic Ocean, North America, the Atlantic Ocean, the Caribbean Sea, South America, the Pacific Ocean, the Southern Ocean, and Antarctica to the South Pole.

The 69th meridian west forms a great circle with the 111th meridian east.

== From Pole to Pole ==
Starting at the North Pole and heading south to the South Pole, the 69th meridian west passes through:

| Co-ordinates | Country, territory or sea | Notes |
|---|---|---|
| 90°0′N 69°0′W | Arctic Ocean | |
| 83°6′N 69°0′W | Lincoln Sea | |
| 82°59′N 69°0′W | Canada | Nunavut — Ellesmere Island |
| 80°34′N 69°0′W | Nares Strait | |
| 78°58′N 69°0′W | Greenland | Inglefield Land |
| 76°16′N 69°0′W | Baffin Bay | |
| 70°42′N 69°0′W | Canada | Nunavut — Baffin Island |
| 62°23′N 69°0′W | Hudson Strait | |
| 60°45′N 69°0′W | Ungava Bay | |
| 59°1′N 69°0′W | Canada | Nunavut — Tiercel Island |
| 58°58′N 69°0′W | Ungava Bay | |
| 58°54′N 69°0′W | Canada | Quebec |
| 48°47′N 69°0′W | Saint Lawrence River | |
| 48°16′N 69°0′W | Canada | Quebec; New Brunswick — from 47°18′N 69°0′W |
| 47°14′N 69°0′W | United States | Maine |
| 44°18′N 69°0′W | Atlantic Ocean | |
| 19°1′N 69°0′W | Dominican Republic | Islands of Hispaniola and Catalina |
| 18°20′N 69°0′W | Caribbean Sea | |
| 12°13′N 69°0′W | Curaçao | |
| 12°8′N 69°0′W | Caribbean Sea | |
| 11°26′N 69°0′W | Venezuela | |
| 6°12′N 69°0′W | Colombia | |
| 1°43′N 69°0′W | Brazil | Amazonas; Acre — from 8°52′S 69°0′W |
| 10°59′S 69°0′W | Bolivia | |
| 11°52′S 69°0′W | Peru | |
| 13°36′S 69°0′W | Bolivia | For about 17 km |
| 13°45′S 69°0′W | Peru | |
| 14°24′S 69°0′W | Bolivia | Passing through Lake Titicaca |
| 16°12′S 69°0′W | Peru | Passing through Lake Titicaca |
| 16°28′S 69°0′W | Bolivia | Passing through Lake Titicaca |
| 18°38′S 69°0′W | Chile | |
| 27°34′S 69°0′W | Argentina | |
| 50°28′S 69°0′W | Atlantic Ocean | |
| 51°27′S 69°0′W | Argentina | |
| 52°12′S 69°0′W | Chile | For about 9 km |
| 52°17′S 69°0′W | Straits of Magellan | |
| 52°39′S 69°0′W | Chile | Isla Grande de Tierra del Fuego and Hoste Island |
| 55°20′S 69°0′W | Pacific Ocean | |
| 60°0′S 69°0′W | Southern Ocean | |
| 67°23′S 69°0′W | Antarctica | Adelaide Island — claimed by Argentina, Chile and the United Kingdom |
| 67°43′S 69°0′W | Southern Ocean | Marguerite Bay |
| 69°57′S 69°0′W | Antarctica | Territory claimed by Argentina, Chile and the United Kingdom |

== See also ==
- 68th meridian west
- 70th meridian west
