= 111th Cavalry Regiment =

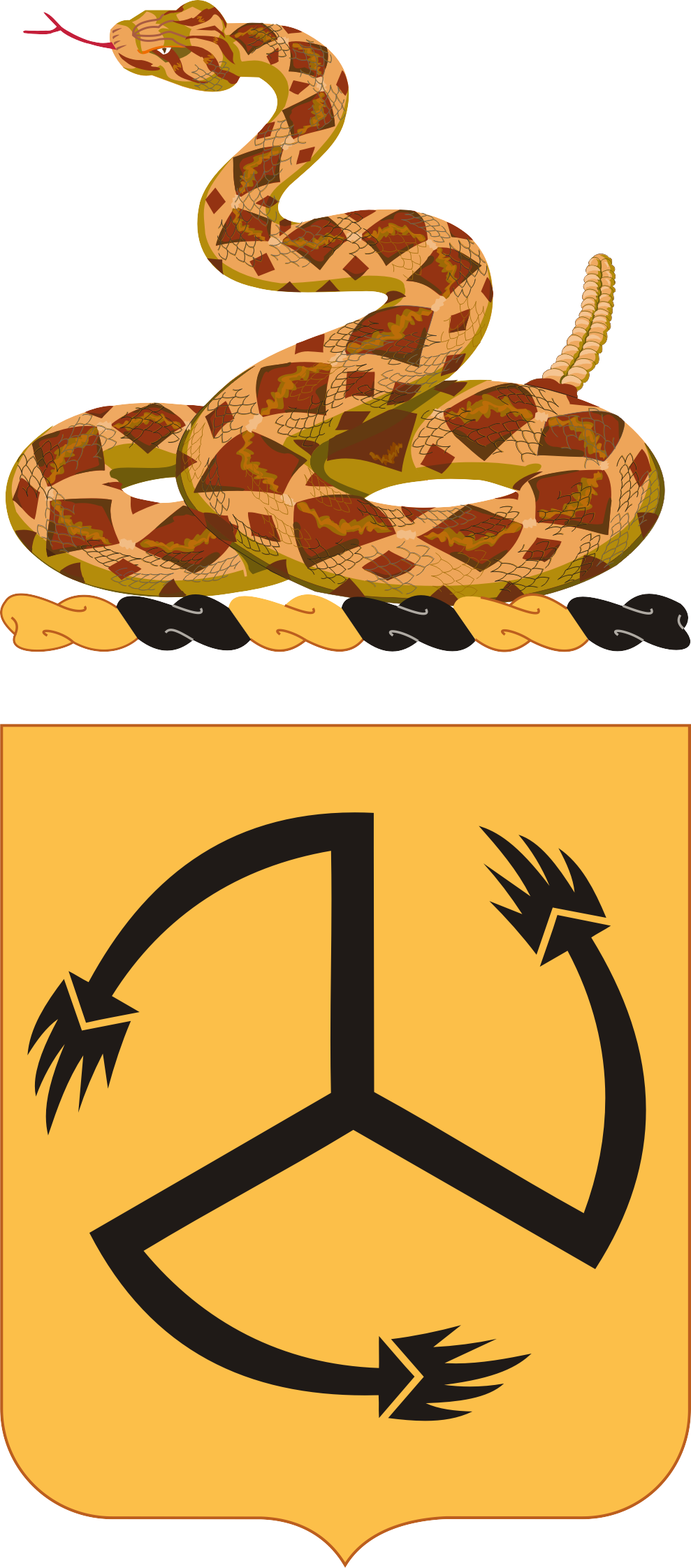
- coat of arms
- Active: 1921–1940
- Country: United States
- Branch: New Mexico Army National Guard
- Size: Regiment
- Part of: 23rd Cavalry Division
- Mottos: Pro Civitate et patria (For state and country)

The 111th Cavalry Regiment was a regiment in the New Mexico National Guard, not to be confused with California's 111th Armored Cavalry Regiment. From 1 November 1921 to 1 February 1922 the regiment's 2nd Squadron was a Colorado National Guard unit. After 2005 its lineage was carried by the 200th Infantry Regiment of the New Mexico National Guard.

== Lineage ==
Constituted 1 June 1921 in the National Guard of New Mexico and Colorado as the 111th Cavalry, and assigned to the 23rd Cavalry Division and organized from new and existing units as follows-

- Headquarters organized and federally recognized 6 March 1924 at Santa Fe, New Mexico. Headquarters Troop, 1st Regiment, New Mexico Cavalry at Albuquerque (organized and federally recognized 26 July 1920 as Troop A, New Mexico Cavalry), redesignated Headquarters Troop 2 May 1922.
- Service Troop organized and federally recognized 18 June 1923 at Portales, New Mexico
- Medical Department Detachment organized and federally recognized 29 July 1929 at Albuquerque, NM.
- Headquarters 1st Squadron organized and federally recognized 12 October 1922 at Santa Fe, NM.; Relocated to Roswell, New Mexico 1 March 1924.
- Troop A, 1st Regiment, New Mexico Cavalry at Estancia, New Mexico (organized and federally recognized 2 June 1921 as Troop F, New Mexico Cavalry; redesignated Troop A 1st Regiment, New Mexico Cavalry 28 September 1921), redesignated Troop A 2 May 1922.
- Troop B, 1st Regiment, New Mexico Cavalry at Carlsbad, New Mexico. (organized and federally recognized 28 July 1920), redesignated Troop B 2 May 1922.
- Troop C, 1st Regiment, New Mexico Cavalry at Deming, New Mexico. (organized and federally recognized 18 June 1921), redesignated Troop C 2 May 1922.
- Headquarters 1st Separate Squadron, Colorado Cavalry at Denver, Co. (organized 8 November 1880 at Denver as Headquarters 1st Battalion Colorado Cavalry; disbanded in 1886 at Denver; reorganized 9 June 1887 at Denver and disbanded 26 June 1889; reorganized 12 July 1897 as Headquarters 1st Separate Squadron, Colorado Cavalry; mustered into federal service 28 June 1916 at Golden, Colorado for Mexican border; redesignated 17 October 1916 as Headquarters 2nd Squadron 1st Cavalry (provisional); mustered out 26 March 1916 at Fort D. A. Russell, Wy.; redesignated 26 July 1917 as Headquarters 1st Squadron 1st Regiment Colorado Cavalry; drafted into federal service at Denver 5 August 1917; disbanded 14 October 1917; reorganized and federally recognized 14 June 1921 at Denver as Headquarters 1st Separate Squadron, Colorado Cavalry) redesignated Headquarters 2nd Squadron 1 November 1921.
- Troop D, 1st Separate Squadron, Colorado Cavalry at Monte Vista (organized and federally recognized 7 October 1920), redesignated Troop D 1 November 1921.
- Troop E, 1st Separate Squadron, Colorado Cavalry at Denver (organized and federally recognized 25 February 1921), redesignated Troop E 1 November 1921.
- Troop F, 1st Separate Squadron, Colorado Cavalry at Pueblo (organized and federally recognized 16 November 1920), redesignated Troop F 1 November 1921.

Second Squadron redesignated 1 February 1922 as 1st Squadron, 117th Cavalry and new 2nd Squadron organized in New Mexico from new and existing units as follows-

- Headquarters 2nd Squadron organized at Santa Fe and federally recognized 3 August 1923; relocated to Deming 9 August 1928
- Troop D, 1st Regiment, New Mexico Cavalry at Santa Fe (organized and federally recognized 11 April 1921), redesignated Troop E 10 June 1922.
- Troop F, organized and federally recognized 11 May 1923 at Silver City
- Troop G, organized and federally recognized 26 June 1923 at Clayton.

Reorganized 15 March as a three Squadron regiment; 3rd Squadron organized and federally recognized 14 July 1929 with Troop I at Carlsbad and Troop K at Taos. Relieved from the 23rd Cavalry Division, converted and redesignated as the 207th Coast Artillery (Antiaircraft) 26 April 1940. Redesignated on 1 July 1940 as 200th Coast Artillery (Antiaircraft).

== Distinctive unit insignia ==
- Description

A Gold color metal and enamel device 1 1/4 inches (3.2 cm) in height overall consisting of a shield blazoned: Or an Avanyu Sable. Attached above the shield from a wreath Or and Sable, a coiled rattlesnake Brün. Attached below and to the sides of the shield a Gold scroll inscribed "PRO CIVITATE ET PATRIA" in Black letters.

- Symbolism

The Avanyu device used by the Pueblo Indians is another form of the triskelion, a lucky talisman and symbolic of energy, motion, and victory. It is also emblematic of "the whirling sun" and "lightning in air" which allude to the firepower and air defense mission of the former unit. The motto translates to "For State and Country."

- Background

The distinctive unit insignia was originally approved for the 111th Cavalry Regiment on 19 June 1926. It was redesignated for the 200th Coast Artillery Regiment (AA) on 7 March 1941. It was redesignated for the 717th Antiaircraft Artillery Gun Battalion on 6 October 1952. The insignia was redesignated for the 200th Artillery Regiment on 7 June 1960. It was redesignated for the 200th Air Defense Artillery Regiment on 9 February 1973. It was redesignated for the 200th Infantry Regiment with the description and symbolism updated on 22 August 2006.

== Coat of arms ==
=== Blazon ===
- Shield

Or an Avanyu Sable. (The Avanyu is a Pueblo Indian device not unlike the device of the Isle of Man conventionalized, which is blazoned three legs embowed conjoined at the thighs, the three arms of the Avanyu each ending in a triangular head bearing five points).

- Crest

That for the regiments of the New Mexico Army National Guard: On a wreath of the colors Or and Sable, a coiled rattlesnake Proper. Motto: PRO CIVITATE ET PATRIA (For State and Country).

=== Symbolism ===
- Shield

The Avanyu device used by the Pueblo Indians is another form of the triskelion, a lucky talisman and symbolic of energy, motion, and victory. It is also emblematic of "the whirling sun" and "lightning in air" which allude to the firepower and air defense mission of the former unit.

- Crest

The crest is that of the New Mexico Army National Guard.

== Campaign streamers ==
none

== Decorations ==
None
