= 65th meridian east =

Line of longitude

65th meridian east

The meridian 65° east of Greenwich is a line of longitude that extends from the North Pole across the Arctic Ocean, Europe, Asia, the Indian Ocean, the Southern Ocean, and Antarctica to the South Pole.

The 65th meridian east forms a great circle with the 115th meridian west.

== From Pole to Pole ==
Starting at the North Pole and heading south to the South Pole, the 65th meridian east passes through:

Co-ordinates	Country, territory or sea	Notes
90°0′N 65°0′E	Arctic Ocean	
81°10′N 65°0′E	Russia	Graham Bell Island, Franz Josef Land, Arkhangelsk Oblast
80°47′N 65°0′E	Barents Sea	
76°29′N 65°0′E	Russia	Severny Island, Novaya Zemlya, Arkhangelsk Oblast
75°47′N 65°0′E	Kara Sea	
69°15′N 65°0′E	Russia	Nenetsia, Yamalo-Nenetsia, Komi, Khantia-Mansia, Sverdlovsk Oblast, Tyumen Oblast, Kurgan Oblast
54°24′N 65°0′E	Kazakhstan	Kostanay Region, Karaganda Region, Kyzylorda Region
43°45′N 65°0′E	Uzbekistan	Navoiy Region, Buxoro Region, Qashqadaryo Region
38°37′N 65°0′E	Turkmenistan	Lebap Region
37°13′N 65°0′E	Afghanistan	Badghis Province, Faryab Province, Ghor Province, Helmand Province, Kandahar Province
29°32′N 65°0′E	Pakistan	Balochistan
25°19′N 65°0′E	Indian Ocean	
60°0′S 65°0′E	Southern Ocean	
67°39′S 65°0′E	Antarctica	Australian Antarctic Territory, claimed by Australia

== See also ==
- 64th meridian east
- 66th meridian east
