= 111th Division =

In military terms, 111th Division or 111th Infantry Division may refer to:

== Infantry divisions ==
- 111th Division (People's Republic of China)
- 111th Infantry Division (German Empire)
- 111th Infantry Division (Wehrmacht), Germany
- 111th Division (Imperial Japanese Army)
- 111th Guards Rifle Division, Soviet Union
- 111th Motor Rifle Division, Soviet Union
- 111th Rifle Division, Soviet Union

== Cavalry divisions ==
- 111th Cavalry Division, Soviet Union

== Armoured divisions ==
- 111th Tank Division, Soviet Union

== See also ==
- List of military divisions by number
- 111th Brigade (disambiguation)
- 111th Regiment (disambiguation)
- 111th Squadron (disambiguation)
- 111th (disambiguation)
