= 111th meridian east =

Line of longitude

111th meridian east

The meridian 111° east of Greenwich is a line of longitude that extends from the North Pole across the Arctic Ocean, Asia, the Indian Ocean, the Southern Ocean, and Antarctica to the South Pole.

The 111th meridian east forms a great circle with the 69th meridian west.

== From Pole to Pole ==
Starting at the North Pole and heading south to the South Pole, the 111th meridian east passes through:

Co-ordinates	Country, territory or sea	Notes
90°0′N 111°0′E	Arctic Ocean	
79°23′N 111°0′E	Laptev Sea	
76°44′N 111°0′E	Russia	Krasnoyarsk Krai — Taymyr Peninsula
74°32′N 111°0′E	Khatanga Gulf	
73°55′N 111°0′E	Russia	Krasnoyarsk Krai — for about 14km Sakha Republic — for about 14km from 73°49′N 111°0′E; Krasnoyarsk Krai — for about 13km from 73°40′N 111°0′E; Sakha Republic — from 73°34′N 111°0′E; Krasnoyarsk Krai — from 72°34′N 111°0′E; Sakha Republic — from 70°50′N 111°0′E; Irkutsk Oblast — from 59°14′N 111°0′E; Republic of Buryatia — from 56°52′N 111°0′E; Zabaykalsky Krai — from 51°41′N 111°0′E
49°12′N 111°0′E	Mongolia	
43°18′N 111°0′E	People's Republic of China	Inner Mongolia; Shaanxi – from 39°33′N 111°0′E; Shanxi – from 39°0′N 111°0′E; Henan – from 34°43′N 111°0′E; Shaanxi – from 33°29′N 111°0′E; Henan - for about 8 km from 33°16′N 111°0′E; Hubei – from 33°12′N 111°0′E, crossing the Three Gorges Dam (at 30°49′N 111°0′E); Hunan – from 30°1′N 111°0′E; Guangxi – from 26°19′N 111°0′E; Hunan – from 25°8′N 111°0′E; Guangxi – from 24°54′N 111°0′E; Guangdong – from 22°38′N 111°0′E
21°23′N 111°0′E	South China Sea	
19°44′N 111°0′E	People's Republic of China	Island of Hainan
19°39′N 111°0′E	South China Sea	Passing through the disputed Paracel Islands
1°36′N 111°0′E	Malaysia	Sarawak – on the island of Borneo
1°1′N 111°0′E	Indonesia	Island of Borneo; West Kalimantan; Central Kalimantan
3°5′S 111°0′E	Java Sea	
6°25′S 111°0′E	Indonesia	Island of Java
8°15′S 111°0′E	Indian Ocean	
60°0′S 111°0′E	Southern Ocean	
66°2′S 111°0′E	Antarctica	Australian Antarctic Territory, claimed by Australia

Next westward: 110th meridian east	111th meridian east forms a great circle with 69th meridian west	Next eastward: 112th meridian east
