= 65th meridian west =

Line of longitude

65th meridian west

The meridian 65° west of Greenwich is a line of longitude that extends from the North Pole across the Arctic Ocean, North America, the Atlantic Ocean, the Caribbean Sea, South America, the Southern Ocean, and Antarctica to the South Pole.

The 65th meridian west forms a great circle with the 115th meridian east.

== From Pole to Pole ==
Starting at the North Pole and heading south to the South Pole, the 65th meridian west passes through:

Co-ordinates	Country, territory or sea	Notes
90°0′N 65°0′W	Arctic Ocean	
83°18′N 65°0′W	Lincoln Sea	
82°54′N 65°0′W	Canada	Nunavut — Ellesmere Island
81°20′N 65°0′W	Nares Strait	
80°46′N 65°0′W	Greenland	Washington Land
76°1′N 65°0′W	Baffin Bay	
70°0′N 65°0′W	Davis Strait	
68°3′N 65°0′W	Canada	Nunavut — Baffin Island
70°0′N 65°0′W	Davis Strait	Cumberland Sound
64°29′N 65°0′W	Canada	Nunavut — Christopher Hall Island, the Leybourne Islands and Baffin Island
62°29′N 65°0′W	Davis Strait	
61°52′N 65°0′W	Canada	Nunavut — Edgell Island and Resolution Island
61°24′N 65°0′W	Hudson Strait	
60°10′N 65°0′W	Canada	Quebec; Newfoundland and Labrador — Labrador, from 54°55′N 65°0′W; Quebec — from 51°45′N 65°0′W
50°16′N 65°0′W	Gulf of Saint Lawrence	
49°13′N 65°0′W	Canada	Quebec — Gaspé Peninsula
48°7′N 65°0′W	Chaleur Bay	
47°50′N 65°0′W	Canada	New Brunswick
45°33′N 65°0′W	Bay of Fundy	
45°5′N 65°0′W	Canada	Nova Scotia
43°46′N 65°0′W	Atlantic Ocean	Passing just west of Bermuda (at 32°17′N 64°54′W)
18°23′N 65°0′W	United States Virgin Islands	Island of Saint Thomas
18°21′N 65°0′W	Caribbean Sea	Passing just west of the island of Saint Croix, United States Virgin Islands (at 17°41′N 64°54′W); Passing just east of La Tortuga Island, Venezuela (at 10°54′N 65°12′W)
10°4′N 65°0′W	Venezuela	
1°11′N 65°0′W	Brazil	Amazonas; Rondônia — from 9°20′S 66°0′W
12°0′S 65°0′W	Bolivia	
22°5′S 65°0′W	Argentina	
40°46′S 65°0′W	Atlantic Ocean	San Matías Gulf
42°7′S 65°0′W	Argentina	
43°16′S 65°0′W	Atlantic Ocean	Passing through the Le Maire Strait between Isla Grande de Tierra del Fuego (at 54°39′S 65°6′W) and Isla de los Estados (at 54°50′S 64°45′W), Argentina
60°0′S 65°0′W	Southern Ocean	
65°55′S 65°0′W	Antarctica	Territory claimed by Argentina, Chile and the United Kingdom

== See also ==
- 64th meridian west
- 66th meridian west
