= 111th Space Operations Squadron =

Arizona Air National Guard unit

111th Space Operations Squadron

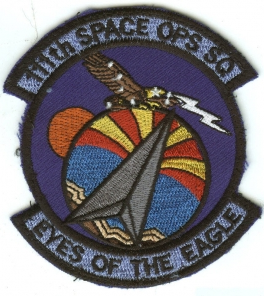
- 111th Space Operations Squadron emblem
- Active: 2003 – present
- Country: United States
- Allegiance: Arizona
- Branch: Air National Guard
- Role: Space operations
- Size: 27
- Part of: Arizona Air National Guard
- Garrison/HQ: Sky Harbor International Airport, Arizona
- Motto: Eyes of the Eagle

Commanders
- Current commander: Lt Col Patty Tuttle

The United States Air Force's 111th Space Operations Squadron is an Air National Guard space communications unit located at Sky Harbor International Airport, Arizona. The squadron is the military's first unit to operate free-floating balloons in the near space environment.

== Previous designations ==
- 111th Space Operations Squadron (2003 – present)
- Det 2, Arizona Air National Guard (???)

== Bases stationed ==
Sky Harbor International Airport, Arizona (2003 – present)

== Equipment Operated ==
Combat SkySat balloons (2003 – present)
