= 67th meridian east =

Line of longitude

67th meridian east

The meridian 67° east of Greenwich is a line of longitude that extends from the North Pole across the Arctic Ocean, Asia, the Indian Ocean, the Southern Ocean, and Antarctica to the South Pole.

The 67th meridian east forms a great circle with the 113th meridian west.

== From Pole to Pole ==
Starting at the North Pole and heading south to the South Pole, the 67th meridian east passes through:

Co-ordinates	Country, territory or sea	Notes
90°0′N 67°0′E	Arctic Ocean	
81°0′N 67°0′E	Barents Sea	
76°56′N 67°0′E	Russia	Severny Island, Novaya Zemlya, Arkhangelsk Oblast
76°4′N 67°0′E	Kara Sea	
71°16′N 67°0′E	Russia	Yamal Peninsula, Yamalo-Nenets Autonomous Okrug
70°48′N 67°0′E	Kara Sea	
70°1′N 67°0′E	Russia	Yamal Peninsula, Yamalo-Nenets Autonomous Okrug
69°23′N 67°0′E	Kara Sea	Baydaratskaya Bay
68°50′N 67°0′E	Russia	Yamalo-Nenetsia, Khantia-Mansia, Tyumen Oblast, Kurgan Oblast
54°46′N 67°0′E	Kazakhstan	North Kazakhstan Region, Akmola Region, Karaganda Region, Turkistan Region
41°14′N 67°0′E	Uzbekistan	Jizzax Region, Samarkand Region (passing through Samarkand), Qashqadaryo Region, Surxondaryo Region
37°23′N 67°0′E	Afghanistan	Balkh Province, Samangan Province, Sar-e Pol Province, Bamyan Province, Daykundi Province, Ghazni Province, Uruzgan Province, Zabul Province, Kandahar Province
31°19′N 67°0′E	Pakistan	Balochistan - passing through Quetta; Sindh - passing through Karachi
24°49′N 67°0′E	Indian Ocean	
60°0′S 67°0′E	Southern Ocean	
67°47′S 67°0′E	Antarctica	Australian Antarctic Territory, claimed by Australia

== See also ==
- 66th meridian east
- 68th meridian east
