= 111th Regiment of Foot (Loyal Birmingham Volunteers) =

Infantry regiment of the British Army

The 111th Regiment of Foot (Loyal Birmingham Volunteers) was an infantry regiment of the British Army from 1794 to 1796. It was formed on 30 May 1794 and disbanded in February 1796.

In 1794 the regiment was raised in Birmingham as Robert's Regiment of Foot and posted to Ireland. In August 1795 it was to be posted to the Caribbean to take part in a British invasion of Saint-Domingue. The invasion had already suffered heavy losses to yellow fever. On hearing of the plan, soldiers of the regiment mutinied in Dublin. In February 1796 the regiment was disbanded and its men were transferred to various regiments at Cork bound for the Caribbean.

== Sources ==
- Perry, James (2005). Arrogant Armies: Great Military Disasters and the Generals Behind Them. Edison: Castle Books.
