= 111th Armored Cavalry Regiment =

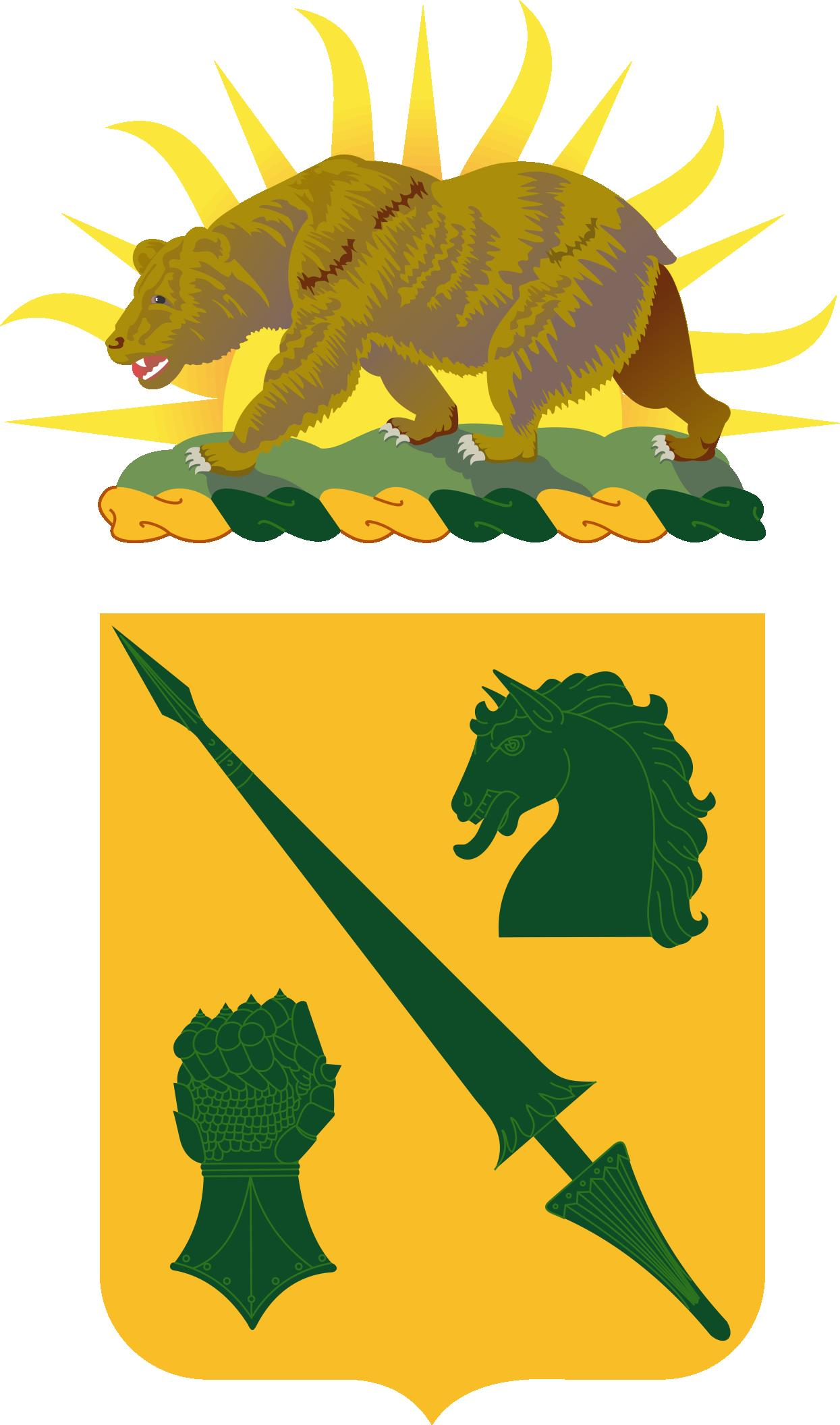
- Coat of Arms of the 111th Armored Cavalry Regiment, later 134th Tank Battalion of the California Army National Guard.
- Active: 1949–1954
- Country: United States
- Branch: United States Army
- Type: Armored cavalry
- Garrison/HQ: Pasadena, California (HHT, 1950–1954)
- Mottos: "By Arms and Courage"

Insignia
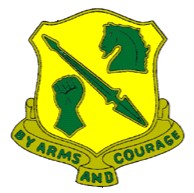
- Distinctive unit insignia

The 111th Armored Cavalry Regiment (111th ACR) was a light armored cavalry regiment that was part of the California Army National Guard, briefly active during the early years of the Cold War.

Constituted in 1949, it included three maneuver battalions by 1951. It was broken up in 1954, with two battalions absorbed into the 40th Armored Division, which had been converted to infantry, to give it experienced armor personnel, while the remaining battalion was mostly converted to antiaircraft artillery.

== History ==
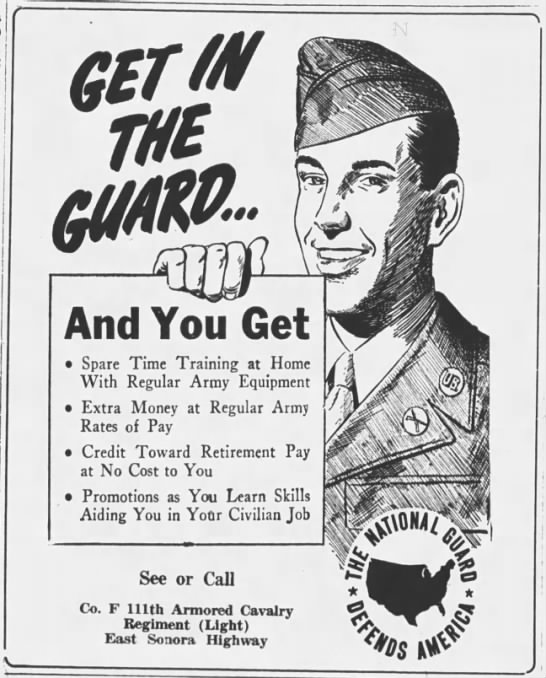
1949 newspaper recruiting advertisement for Company F, 111th ACR

The 111th Armored Cavalry Regiment (Light) was constituted on 19 August 1949 as a unit of the California National Guard after a request from the state of California to form an armored cavalry regiment was approved by the National Guard Bureau. It was one of seven National Guard armored cavalry regiments authorized in 1949 to provide corps-level reconnaissance and security capabilities in event of mobilization. From inception, the regiment was administratively supervised by the 1st Provisional Brigade, created to serve as an intermediate headquarters for non-divisional and unbrigaded units of the California National Guard.

It initially included the Imperial Valley-based 1st Battalion, with Headquarters and Headquarters Company (HHC) at Imperial, and the Northern California-based 2nd Battalion, with HHC at Red Bluff. The two battalions were redesignated from the 109th and 118th Mechanized Cavalry Reconnaissance Squadrons, respectively, on 15 September. The 109th had been organized and Federally recognized on 18 September 1947, while the 118th had been organized and Federally recognized on 8 June 1949; both California National Guard units were constituted on 5 August 1946.

Of the reconnaissance companies of the regiment, Companies A (Indio), B (Brawley), and C (Calexico) fell under 1st Battalion, while D (Susanville), E (Eureka), and F (Oakdale) were with 2nd Battalion. The Assault Gun Company of the 2nd Battalion was at Quincy, while the Tank Company of 1st Battalion was at El Centro. The first six lettered companies, the Tank Company of the 1st Battalion, and the Assault Gun Company of the 2nd Battalion were redesignated from the lettered troops of the 109th and 118th Squadrons.

The organization and Federal recognition of new units followed, beginning with the Assault Gun Company of the 1st Battalion at Holtville on 15 October. By the end of 1949, the 111th ACR included 50 officers, two warrant officers, and 471 enlisted men. The Headquarters and Headquarters Company (HHC) of the regiment followed on 12 January 1950 at Pasadena. In the summer of 1950, the units of the 111th participated in its first summer field training encampment, held at Camp San Luis Obispo with most of the 1st Provisional Brigade between 16 and 30 July. The regimental Service Company and Medical Detachment were organized at Montebello on 23 October and 20 November, respectively. The HHC of the 1st Battalion relocated to El Centro on 15 December.

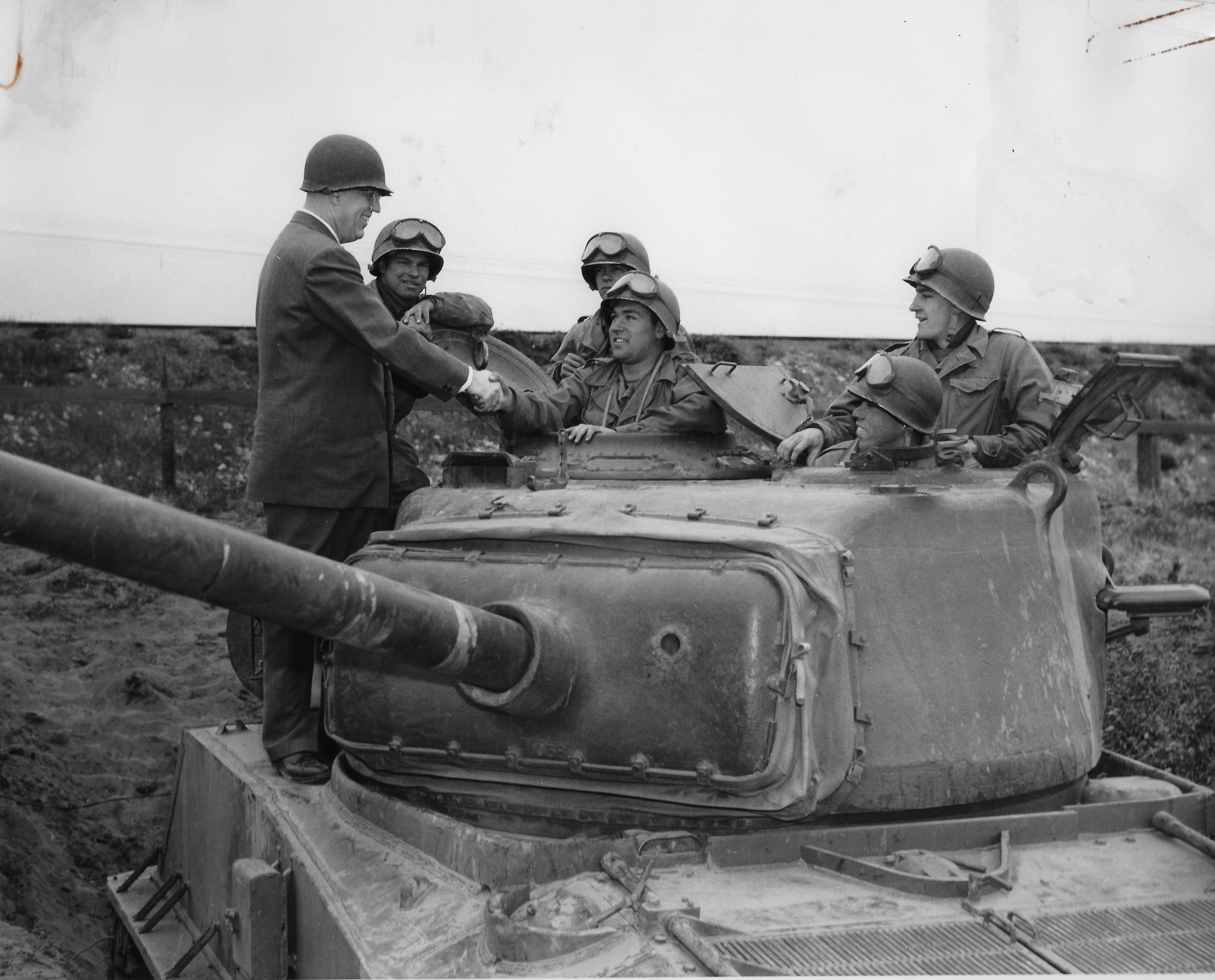
California Governor Earl Warren meeting a 2nd Battalion tank crew during 1951 summer training at Camp Cooke

The regiment was brought up to full strength by the organization and Federal recognition of its 3rd Battalion on 26 January 1951, headquartered at Van Nuys. The HHC of 3rd Battalion was organized on 9 January, followed by Howitzer Company on 30 March at Van Nuys and two 3rd Battalion lettered companies: G at Burbank on 15 May and H on 22 October at Los Angeles. Due to changes in the structure of light ACRs, the assault gun companies of the 111th became howitzer companies on 1 April. The regiment participated in 1951 summer field training between 17 June and 1 July at Camp Cooke and Hunter Liggett Military Reservation along with the 49th Infantry Division. The Medical Detachment relocated to Arcadia on 15 April, and the HHC of the 3rd Battalion relocated to Burbank on 1 November.

The 2nd Battalion HHC relocated from Sacramento to Del Paso Heights on 1 July 1952, although it returned to Sacramento on 15 January 1954. The regiment participated in 1952 summer field training between 17 and 31 August at Hunter Liggett, alongside smaller nondivisional units. Company I, organized at Van Nuys on 15 November 1952, relocated to San Fernando on 15 March 1953. The Tank Company of the 3rd Battalion relocated from Van Nuys to Canoga Park on 1 May. From 16 to 30 August of that year, the regiment participated in what was to be its last summer field training, held at Hunter Liggett with the 40th Infantry Division (NGUS). On 1 October, the regiment dropped the 'light' designation. The Howitzer Company of the 3rd Battalion relocated to Burbank on 13 October.

In 1954, the regiment was broken up, beginning with the conversion and redesignation of the 2nd Battalion as the 170th Antiaircraft Artillery Battalion on 1 June, excluding Company E, which became the HHC of the 1401st Engineer Battalion (Combat) (Army) (NGUS). A month later, the Headquarters and Headquarters Company of the 111th ACR became that of Combat Command C of the 40th Armored Division, the 1st Battalion became the 134th Tank Battalion, and the 3rd Battalion consolidated with the 2nd Battalion, 223rd Infantry to become the 139th Tank Battalion. These elements of the 111th were absorbed into the 40th Armored, which had been converted from the 40th Infantry Division, to provide experienced armored personnel to the unit.

== Heraldry ==
Just before the breakup of the regiment, the distinctive unit insignia and coat of arms of the regiment were approved on 1 March 1954. The distinctive unit insignia depicted a horse's head, lance, and gauntlet to symbolize cavalry, medieval armor, and the shock tactics of armored forces, respectively. Its green and yellow colors represented the armor branch. Below the shield of the insignia was the motto "By Arms and Courage." The regimental coat of arms was the shield of its distinctive unit insignia with the crest of the California Army National Guard above it. The distinctive unit insignia continued to be used by the 134th Tank Battalion until 1960, after the latter was consolidated with other units to form the 185th Armor Regiment.
