= 65th Brigade =

65th Brigade may refer to:

== Iran ==
- 65th Airborne Special Forces Brigade

== Japan ==
- 65th Independent Mixed Brigade (Imperial Japanese Army)

== Ukraine ==
- 65th Mechanized Brigade (Ukraine)

== United Kingdom ==
- 65th Anti-Aircraft Brigade
- 65th Brigade (United Kingdom)
- 65th (Howitzer) Brigade, Royal Field Artillery, British Army unit during World War I
- 65th (8th London) Brigade, Royal Field Artillery, British Army unit after World War I
- 65th (Manchester Regiment) Anti-Aircraft Brigade, Royal Artillery

== United States ==
- 65th Field Artillery Brigade (United States)
- 65th Medical Brigade

== See also ==
- 65th Brigade Engineer Battalion (United States)
- 65th Division (disambiguation)
- 65th Regiment (disambiguation)
