= 65th Division =

In military terms, 65th Division may refer to:

== Infantry divisions ==
- 65th Infantry Division (Wehrmacht), Germany
- 65th Infantry Division "Granatieri di Savoia", Italian Army, Second World War
- 65th Division (Imperial Japanese Army)
- 65th Infantry Division (Russian Empire)
- 65th Guards Rifle Division, Soviet Union
- 65th Rifle Division, Soviet Union
- 65th (2nd Lowland) Division, British Army, First World War
- 65th Infantry Division (United States)

== Cavalry divisions ==
- 65th Cavalry Division, United States

== Aviation divisions ==
- 65th Air Division, United States

== Other divisions ==
- 65th Anti-Aircraft Artillery Division, Soviet Union

== See also ==
- List of military divisions by number
- 65th Brigade (disambiguation)
- 65th Regiment (disambiguation)
- 65th Squadron (disambiguation)
