= Henry Kater Peninsula =

Peninsula in Nunavut, Canada

The Henry Kater Peninsula (69°23′N 068°03′W) is a peninsula on northern Baffin Island, in Nunavut, Canada. It protrudes in an eastern direction into Davis Strait. It's bounded to the north by Arctic Harbour. Further north lies Clyde Inlet. Home Bay borders the peninsula to the south.

It is named after the English physicist, Henry Kater.

== Geography ==
The peninsula is 89 km (55 mi) long by 1 km (0.62 mi)-37 km (23 mi) wide. Its highest point rises 272 m (892 ft) above sea level. At least between 34,000 and 10,000 BP, Henry Kater Peninsula was ice-covered.

== Population ==
There are no permanent communities on Henry Kater Peninsula, though Wenzel noted some Inuit maintained fixed winter residences in villages on the peninsula up through and during the mid 20th century. English trader and hermit Hector Pitchforth lived on the peninsula, dying of starvation in his home in January 1927.
