= 111th Regiment of Foot (1761) =

Infantry regiment of the British Army

The 111th Regiment of Foot was an infantry regiment of the British Army from 1761 to 1763 which was raised in 1761 by the regimentation of independent companies, and was disbanded in 1763.
