= 67th Regiment =

67th Regiment or 67th Infantry Regiment may refer to:

- 67th (South Hampshire) Regiment of Foot, an infantry unit of the British Army
- 67th Infantry Regiment, a unit of the Ottoman Empire during World War I which fought at the Battle of Beersheba (1917)
- 67th Infantry Regiment (United States), a unit of the US Army during World War I
- 67th Armored Regiment, a armoured unit of the US Army, the former 67th Infantry Regiment (Medium Tanks)

American Civil War

- 67th Illinois Volunteer Infantry Regiment, a unit of the Union (Northern) Army
- 67th Indiana Infantry Regiment, a unit of the Union (Northern) Army
- 67th New York Infantry, a unit of the Union (Northern) Army
- 67th Ohio Infantry, a unit of the Union (Northern) Army
- 67th United States Colored Infantry Regiment, a unit of the Union (Northern) Army

== See also ==
- 67th Division (disambiguation)
- 67 Squadron (disambiguation)
