= 65th Regiment =

65th Regiment may refer to:

- 65th (2nd Yorkshire, North Riding) Regiment of Foot, a unit of the British Army
- 65th Infantry Regiment (Philippines)
- 65th Infantry Regiment (United States), a unit of the United States Army
- 65th Air Defense Artillery Regiment, a unit of the United States Army
- 65th Armoured Regiment (India), an armoured unit of the Indian Army

American Civil War regiments

- 65th Indiana Infantry Regiment, Union Army
- 65th Illinois Volunteer Infantry Regiment, Union Army
- 65th New York Volunteer Infantry, Union Army
- 65th Ohio Infantry, Union Army

== See also ==
- 65th Division (disambiguation)
- 65th Squadron (disambiguation)
