= 67th Division =

67th Division or 67th Infantry Division may refer to:

== Infantry divisions ==
- 67th Infantry Division (Russian Empire)
- 67th Motor Rifle Division, Soviet Union, earlier the 67th Mechanized Division
- 67th Rifle Division, Soviet Union
- 67th Guards Rifle Division, Soviet Union
- 67th Division (Spain)
- 67th (2nd Home Counties) Division, British Army, World War I
- 67th Infantry Division (United States), an unorganized World War II division

== Other divisions ==
- 67th Anti-Aircraft Artillery Division, Soviet Union

== See also ==
- List of military divisions by number
- 67th Brigade (disambiguation)
- 67th Regiment (disambiguation)
- 67th Squadron (disambiguation)
