= 113th meridian west =

Line of longitude

113th meridian west

The meridian 113° west of Greenwich is a line of longitude that extends from the North Pole across the Arctic Ocean, North America, the Pacific Ocean, the Southern Ocean, and Antarctica to the South Pole.

The 113th meridian west forms a great circle with the 67th meridian east.

== From Pole to Pole ==
Starting at the North Pole and heading south to the South Pole, the 113th meridian west passes through:

Co-ordinates	Country, territory or sea	Notes
90°0′N 113°0′W	Arctic Ocean	
78°26′N 113°0′W	Canada	Northwest Territories — Borden Island
78°17′N 113°0′W	Wilkins Strait	
77°54′N 113°0′W	Canada	Northwest Territories — Mackenzie King Island
77°31′N 113°0′W	Unnamed waterbody	
76°16′N 113°0′W	Canada	Northwest Territories — Melville Island
75°5′N 113°0′W	Liddon Gulf	
74°58′N 113°0′W	Canada	Northwest Territories — Melville Island
74°24′N 113°0′W	Parry Channel	Viscount Melville Sound
73°0′N 113°0′W	Canada	Northwest Territories — Victoria Island
70°35′N 113°0′W	Prince Albert Sound	
70°19′N 113°0′W	Canada	Northwest Territories — Linaluk Island and Victoria Island; Nunavut — from 70°0′N 113°0′W on Victoria Island
68°29′N 113°0′W	Coronation Gulf	
67°57′N 113°0′W	Canada	Nunavut — Lawford Islands
67°55′N 113°0′W	Coronation Gulf	
67°40′N 113°0′W	Canada	Nunavut; Northwest Territories — from 65°39′N 113°0′W, passing through the Great Slave Lake; Alberta — from 60°0′N 113°0′W
49°0′N 113°0′W	United States	Montana; Idaho — from 44°26′N 113°0′W; Utah — from 42°0′N 113°0′W, passing through the Great Salt Lake; Arizona — from 37°0′N 113°0′W
31°56′N 113°0′W	Mexico	Sonora
30°33′N 113°0′W	Gulf of California	
28°27′N 113°0′W	Mexico	Baja California; Baja California Sur — from 28°0′N 113°0′W
26°33′N 113°0′W	Pacific Ocean	
60°0′S 113°0′W	Southern Ocean	
74°9′S 113°0′W	Antarctica	Unclaimed territory

== See also ==
- 112th meridian west
- 114th meridian west
