= 112th meridian west =

Line of longitude

112th meridian west

The meridian 112° west of Greenwich is a line of longitude that extends from the North Pole across the Arctic Ocean, North America, the Pacific Ocean, the Southern Ocean, and Antarctica to the South Pole.

The 112th meridian west forms a great circle with the 68th meridian east.

Within the United States, it passes directly through the capital cities of three states (Arizona, Montana, and Utah).

== From Pole to Pole ==
Starting at the North Pole and heading south to the South Pole, the 112th meridian west passes through:

Co-ordinates	Country, territory or sea	Notes
90°0′N 112°0′W	Arctic Ocean	
78°33′N 112°0′W	Canada	Northwest Territories — Borden Island
78°21′N 112°0′W	Wilkins Strait	
78°2′N 112°0′W	Canada	Northwest Territories — Mackenzie King Island
77°20′N 112°0′W	Unnamed waterbody	
76°0′N 112°0′W	Canada	Northwest Territories — Melville Island
75°9′N 112°0′W	Liddon Gulf	
75°1′N 112°0′W	Canada	Northwest Territories — Melville Island
74°28′N 112°0′W	Parry Channel	Viscount Melville Sound
72°53′N 112°0′W	Canada	Northwest Territories — Victoria Island; Nunavut — from 70°0′N 112°0′W on Victoria Island
68°31′N 112°0′W	Coronation Gulf	
68°14′N 112°0′W	Canada	Nunavut — Duke of York Archipelago
68°10′N 112°0′W	Coronation Gulf	
67°45′N 112°0′W	Canada	Nunavut; Northwest Territories — from 65°30′N 112°0′W, passing through the Great Slave Lake; Alberta — from 60°0′N 112°0′W
49°0′N 112°0′W	United States	Montana, passing through Helena at 46°37′N 112°0′W; Idaho — from 44°32′N 112°0′W, passing through Idaho Falls at 43°31′N 112°0′W; Utah — from 42°0′N 112°0′W, passing through Salt Lake City at 40°49′N 112°0′W; Arizona — from 37°0′N 112°0′W, passing through Phoenix at 33°27′N 112°0′W
31°37′N 112°0′W	Mexico	Sonora
28°51′N 112°0′W	Gulf of California	
27°6′N 112°0′W	Mexico	Baja California Sur
24°44′N 112°0′W	Magdalena Bay	
24°32′N 112°0′W	Mexico	Baja California Sur — Isla Santa Margarita
24°31′N 112°0′W	Pacific Ocean	Passing just east of Roca Partida, Revillagigedo Islands, Mexico at 19°0′N 112°4′W
60°0′S 112°0′W	Southern Ocean	
74°10′S 112°0′W	Antarctica	Unclaimed territory

== See also ==
- 111th meridian west
- 113th meridian west
