= 111th meridian west =

Line of longitude

111th meridian west

The meridian 111° west of Greenwich is a line of longitude that extends from the North Pole across the Arctic Ocean, North America, the Pacific Ocean, the Southern Ocean, and Antarctica to the South Pole.

The 111th meridian west forms a great circle with the 69th meridian east.

In the United States, the Western border of Wyoming with Montana, Idaho, and Utah lies on the meridian 34° west of Washington, which is a couple of miles west of the meridian 111° west of Greenwich.

== From Pole to Pole ==
Starting at the North Pole and heading south to the South Pole, the 111th meridian west passes through:

| Co-ordinates | Country, territory or sea | Notes |
|---|---|---|
| 90°0′N 111°0′W | Arctic Ocean | |
| 78°42′N 111°0′W | Canada | Northwest Territories — Borden Island |
| 78°22′N 111°0′W | Wilkins Strait | |
| 78°6′N 111°0′W | Canada | Northwest Territories — Mackenzie King Island |
| 77°25′N 111°0′W | Unnamed waterbody | |
| 75°32′N 111°0′W | Canada | Northwest Territories — Melville Island |
| 74°37′N 111°0′W | Parry Channel | Viscount Melville Sound |
| 72°25′N 111°0′W | Canada | Northwest Territories — Victoria Island; Nunavut — from 70°0′N 111°0′W on Victoria Island, and Edinburgh Island |
| 68°28′N 111°0′W | Coronation Gulf | |
| 67°53′N 111°0′W | Canada | Nunavut — Hepburn Island and the mainland Northwest Territories — from 65°30′N 111°0′W, passing through the Great Slave Lake; Alberta — from 60°0′N 111°0′W, passing through Lake Athabasca |
| 49°0′N 111°0′W | United States | Montana; Wyoming — from 45°0′N 111°0′W; Utah — from 41°1′N 111°0′W; Arizona — from 37°0′N 111°0′W, passing just west of Tucson at 32°13′N 110°55′W |
| 31°20′N 111°0′W | Mexico | Sonora — passing just west of Hermosillo at 29°6′N 110°57′W |
| 27°58′N 111°0′W | Gulf of California | |
| 25°25′N 111°0′W | Mexico | Baja California Sur |
| 24°4′N 111°0′W | Pacific Ocean | |
| 18°50′N 111°0′W | Mexico | Socorro Island in the Revillagigedo Islands, Colima |
| 18°44′N 111°0′W | Pacific Ocean | |
| 60°0′S 111°0′W | Southern Ocean | |
| 74°13′S 111°0′W | Antarctica | Unclaimed territory |

== See also ==
- 110th meridian west
- 112th meridian west
