= 68th meridian east =

Line of longitude

68th meridian east

The meridian 68° east of Greenwich is a line of longitude that extends from the North Pole across the Arctic Ocean, Asia, the Indian Ocean, the Southern Ocean, and Antarctica to the South Pole.

The 68th meridian east forms a great circle with the 112th meridian west.

== From Pole to Pole ==
Starting at the North Pole and heading south to the South Pole, the 68th meridian east passes through:

Co-ordinates	Country, territory or sea	Notes
90°0′N 68°0′E	Arctic Ocean	
81°0′N 68°0′E	Barents Sea	
77°0′N 68°0′E	Russia	Severny Island, Novaya Zemlya
76°14′N 68°0′E	Kara Sea	
71°31′N 68°0′E	Russia	Yamal Peninsula
69°28′N 68°0′E	Kara Sea	Baydaratskaya Bay
68°25′N 68°0′E	Russia	
54°57′N 68°0′E	Kazakhstan	
41°2′N 68°0′E	Uzbekistan	
40°51′N 68°0′E	Kazakhstan	For about 6 km
40°48′N 68°0′E	Uzbekistan	
39°36′N 68°0′E	Tajikistan	
39°1′N 68°0′E	Uzbekistan	
37°42′N 68°0′E	Tajikistan	
36°56′N 68°0′E	Afghanistan	
31°39′N 68°0′E	Pakistan	Balochistan; Sindh
23°47′N 68°0′E	Indian Ocean	Passing just west of the Westernmost Point of India near Guhar Moti India (at 23.71°N 68.03°E)
60°0′S 68°0′E	Southern Ocean	
67°51′S 68°0′E	Antarctica	Australian Antarctic Territory, claimed by Australia

== See also ==
- 67th meridian east
- 69th meridian east
