= Eight Bears Island =

Island in the Northwest Territories, Canada

- Location within Northwest Territories Location within Canada

Geography
- Location: Northern Canada
- Coordinates: 77°6′2″N 113°22′10″W
- Archipelago: Queen Elizabeth Islands
- Area: 18.12 km^{2} (7.00 sq mi)

Administration
- Canada
- Territory: Northwest Territories

Demographics
- Population: Uninhabited

Additional information
- Discovered: June 1915 by Vilhjalmur Stefansson

Eight Bears Island is an uninhabited island in the Parry Islands sub-group of the Queen Elizabeth Islands, Northwest Territories, Canada. It lies roughly equidistant between Mackenzie King Island and Emerald Isle, immediately east of Fitzwilliam Owen Island. Its name comes from the explorer Edwin Willard Deming whose family was nicknamed "The Eight Bears".

== History ==
The island was discovered in June 1915 by Vilhjalmur Stefansson during the Canadian Arctic Expedition, 1913–1916. It was named by the expedition's photographer, Hubert Wilkins, in honor of the "Eight Bears": the American painter Edwin Willard Deming and his family. The Deming family had maintained correspondence with Wilkins during his earlier travels, continuing to send letters even when he was presumed dead.

The island is scientifically obscure; the last documented survey was by geologist J.G. Fyles of the Geological Survey of Canada on July 18, 1964, who noted the presence of raised beaches and marine shells.

== Geography ==
Located at 77°N, the island remains ice-bound for the majority of the year. It is situated approximately 300 kilometres (160 nmi) north of the Parry Channel, well removed from the primary routes of the Northwest Passage.
