= Christian Theodore Pedersen =

Norwegian-American seaman, whaling captain and fur trader

C.T. Pedersen, c. 1922–1928

Christian Theodore Pedersen (23 December 1876 – 20 June 1969) was a Norwegian-American seaman, whaling captain and fur trader active in Alaska, Canada, and the northern Pacific from the 1890s to the 1930s. He was called "one of the canniest old skippers in the western arctic" by a contemporary.

== Biography ==
Pedersen, known as Theodore to his friends and usually as C.T. Pedersen for business, was born 23 December 1876 in Sandefjord, Norway. He left on his first whaling voyage at age 17; by 1908 he was captain of the schooner Challenge which wintered in the arctic at Herschel Island. He was captain of the schooner Elvira in 1912. Pedersen was associated with the early stages of the Canadian Arctic Expedition under Vilhjalmur Stefansson whom he had known since 1906. He helped select the steam brigantine Karluk for the expedition and sailed it from San Francisco to Victoria, British Columbia. He resigned before the ship was outfitted and was replaced by Robert Bartlett.

Pedersen then returned to the Elvira for whaling and trading in the arctic in 1913. In August 1913, the Elvira was frozen in and damaged by ice near Icy Reef west of Demarcation Point on Alaska's Arctic coast (east of Kaktovik and west of the Canada–United States border). The ship was further damaged by a storm to the point that Pedersen and her crew were forced to abandon her and seek refuge aboard the Belvedere. Pedersen and Olaf Swenson of the Belvedere traveled overland by foot and dogsled to Fairbanks to carry news and arrange relief supplies for the crews on the Belvedere. Sources differ on whether Pederson was owner as well as captain of the Elvira.

Pedersen then signed on as captain of the whaling and trading ship Herman for the H. Liebes Company of San Francisco. The 1914 voyage of the Herman was the subject of a motion picture by Dr. L. Lawrence, a videotape copy of which is held by the University of Alaska. In the course of this voyage, the Herman picked up Captain Robert Bartlett at Emma Harbor, Siberia and transported him to St. Michael, Alaska where Bartlett transmitted to Ottawa the news that the Karluk had been crushed in the ice and the survivors were marooned on Wrangel Island off the northern coast of Siberia.

Pedersen married May Olive Jordan (5/11/1893-4/22/1982), a Canadian nurse, in 1920. Subsequently, she accompanied him on many Arctic trips and provided medicines and health services to the natives at their stops. They had one son, Charles. Pedersen had several children from previous relationships including sons Ted and Walter who were well-known Alaskans.

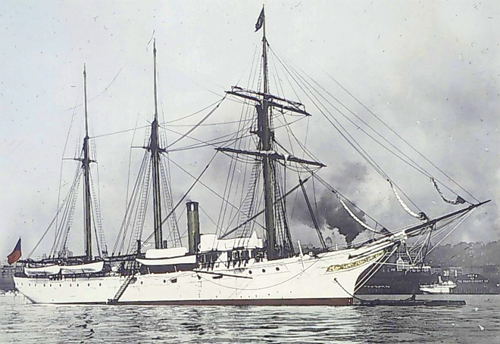
The Patterson in her days as a survey ship

Pedersen resigned from H. Liebes Company in 1923 and went into business on his own account with the schooner Ottilie Fjord, which was refitted with an engine and operated as the motor schooner Nanuk in 1924 and 1925. The business was incorporated as the Northern Whaling and Trading Company. A Canadian subsidiary, the Canalaska Trading Company, operated two small trading schooners with the goods transferred at Herschel Island. The company established trading posts throughout the Kitikmeot region of Canada. After 1925 the Nanuk was replaced by the larger Patterson, formerly a USCGS survey ship. The Nanuk was sold to the Swenson Fur Trading Company in 1927. Besides establishing fixed trading posts, Pederson developed a strategy of offering small schooners for trappers. These were built to order in California and carried to the arctic on the Patterson. The last of these schooners, North Star of Herschel Island, delivered in 1936, is now in private hands in Victoria, British Columbia. Canalaska was sold to the Hudson's Bay Company in 1936; Pedersen retired from the sea but continued to be involved in the fur trade as a business owner. Pedersen's trading voyage in 1935 was filmed by his son Ted and videotapes derived from that film are in the collection of the University of Alaska. That archive also has a substantial collection of Pedersen's business records.

Pedersen was killed by intruders in his Pacifica, San Mateo County, California home on 20 June 1969. His wife was also beaten; she survived but sustained severe injuries and did not live independently again. Two escaped convicts found hiding on the premises were arrested in the crime.
