= Canadian Arctic Expedition, 1913–1916 =

Scientific expedition in the Arctic Circle

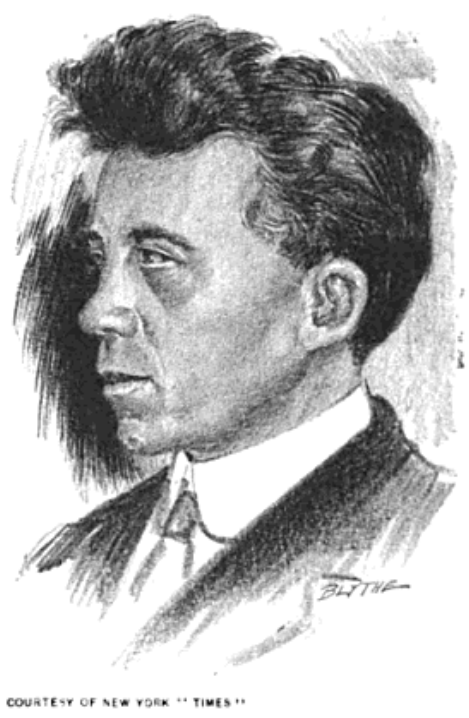
Vilhjalmur Stefansson 1915

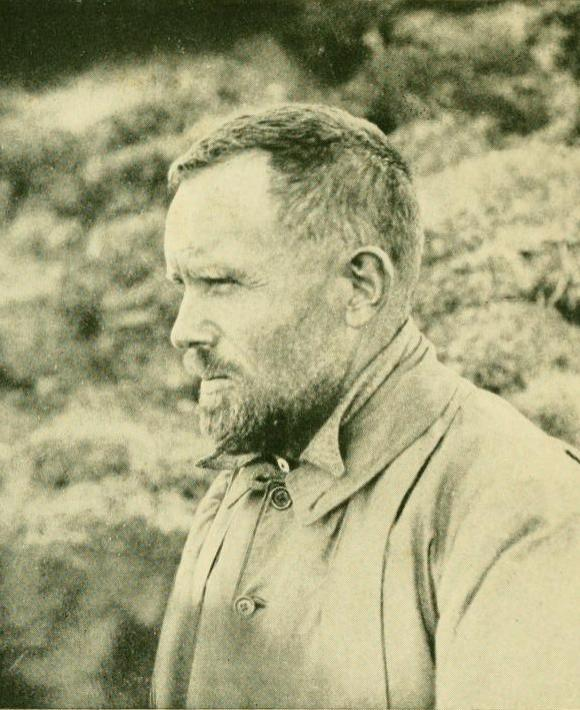
Dr. Rudolph Martin Anderson

The Canadian Arctic Expedition 1913–1918 was a scientific expedition in the Arctic Circle organized and led by Vilhjalmur Stefansson. The expedition was originally to be sponsored by the (US) National Geographic Society and the American Museum of Natural History. Canada took over the sponsorship because of the potential for discovery of new land and Stefansson, who though born in Canada was now an American, re-established his Canadian citizenship. The expedition was divided into a Northern Party led by Stefansson, and a Southern Party led by R M. Anderson.

== Northern Party ==
The objective of the Northern Party was to explore for new land north and west of the known lands of the Canadian Arctic. At this time the possible existence of large undiscovered land masses, comparable to the Canadian Arctic islands or even a small continent, was scientifically plausible. The approach of the Northern Party, besides simply going out and looking for land, was a program of through-ice depth soundings to map the edge of the continental shelf. Meteorological, magnetic, and marine biological investigations were also planned.

== Southern Party ==
The objective of the Southern Party was scientific documentation of the geography, geology, resources, wildlife, and people of the Mackenzie River delta and adjacent regions of Canada between Cape Parry and the Kent Peninsula, for about 100 mi (160 km) inland, and southern and eastern Victoria Island. Copper deposits and trade routes were of particular interest.

== Expedition ==
1913 was a particularly bad year for Arctic navigation. All of the expedition ships were frozen in before they could reach their initial destination of Herschel Island. The principal ship of the expedition, the Karluk, was carried off and eventually crushed by the ice, leading to the loss of eleven lives before a famous rescue.

Most of the Southern Party had travelled in other ships of the expedition, and Stefansson left the Karluk with a party of five before the ship was carried off. Stefansson promptly purchased a small schooner, the North Star, reconstituted the Northern Party with local hires and resumed exploring. Only one of the fourteen Karluk survivors rejoined the expedition.

The expedition purchased another ship, the Polar Bear, in 1915. The Southern Party remained in the North through the summer of 1916, exploring and mapping as far east as Bathurst Inlet. Some members of the Northern Party continued exploring through 1918.

== Results and legacy ==
The expedition discovered land previously unknown even to the Inuit (including Brock, Eight Bears, Mackenzie King, Borden, Meighen, Lougheed and Stefansson Islands), produced valuable data, and launched the careers of several explorers and scientists. The controversies it engendered persisted for decades.

== See also ==
- Diamond Jenness
- Robert Bartlett (explorer)
- Hubert Wilkins
- Christian Theodore Pedersen
- Voyage of the Karluk
- Ernest de Koven Leffingwell

== Sources ==
- Bartlett, Robert A.; Hale, Ralph T. (1916). The last voyage of the Karluk : flagship of Vilhjalmar Stefansson's Canadian Arctic Expedition of 1913–16. McClelland, Toronto.
- Bovet, John A. (1979) Archivaria 9 pp. 254–255 [Review of] Stefansson and the Canadian Arctic
- Diubaldo, Richard J. Stefansson and the Canadian Arctic McGill-Queen's Press – MQUP, 1998 ISBN 0773518150
- Gray, David. The People of the CAE. Northern Party with a contribution from Jette Elsebeth Ashlee. Canadian Museum of Civilization
- Gray, David. Canada's little arctic navy. The ships of the CAE. Canadian Museum of Civilization
- Gray, David. New Lands: explorations of the Northern Party Canadian Museum of Civilization
- Gray, David. New knowledge: Science and the Southern Party. Canadian Museum of Civilization
- Jenness, Stuart Edward. The Making of an Explorer: George Hubert Wilkins and the Canadian Arctic Expedition, 1913–1916. McGill-Queen's Press – MQUP, 2004. accessed April 26, 2009.
- Levy, Buddy (2022). Empire of Ice and Stone. St. Martin's Press, United States. ISBN 978-1-250-27444-1.
- New York Times September 18, 1915 Stefansson's quest to test a theory
- Stefansson, Vilhjalmur (1921) The friendly Arctic; the story of five years in polar regions. Macmillan, New York
