= 110th meridian west =

Line of longitude

110th meridian west (interactive map)

In Canada, the 110th meridian west defines part of the border between the Northwest Territories and Nunavut, and it approximately defines the border between Alberta and Saskatchewan.

The meridian 110° west of Greenwich is a line of longitude that extends from the North Pole across the Arctic Ocean, North America, the Pacific Ocean, the Southern Ocean, and Antarctica to the South Pole.

The 110th meridian west forms a great circle with the 70th meridian east.

In Canada, the meridian forms the boundary between Nunavut and the Northwest Territories north of the parallel 70° north. Originally 110°W was intended as the Fourth Meridian for the Dominion Land Survey, but because of the imperfect surveying methods of the time, the meridian was placed a few hundred metres west of this longitude. The Fourth Meridian has been the entire boundary between Alberta and Saskatchewan since 1905.

In the United States, the meridian formed the western border of the historic and extralegal Territory of Jefferson.

== From pole to pole ==
Starting at the North Pole and heading south to the South Pole, the 110th meridian west passes through:

Co-ordinates	Country, territory or sea	Notes
90°0′N 110°0′W	Arctic Ocean	
78°41′N 110°0′W	Canada	Northwest Territories / Nunavut border — Borden Island
78°19′N 110°0′W	Wilkins Strait	
78°7′N 110°0′W	Canada	Northwest Territories / Nunavut border — Mackenzie King Island
77°55′N 110°0′W	Unnamed waterbody	
76°28′N 110°0′W	Canada	Northwest Territories / Nunavut border — Melville Island
76°14′N 110°0′W	Eldridge Bay	
75°54′N 110°0′W	Canada	Northwest Territories / Nunavut border — Melville Island (for about 2 km)
75°53′N 110°0′W	Sabine Bay	
75°33′N 110°0′W	Canada	Northwest Territories / Nunavut border — Melville Island
74°50′N 110°0′W	Parry Channel	Viscount Melville Sound
72°59′N 110°0′W	Canada	Northwest Territories / Nunavut border — Victoria Island; Nunavut — from 70°0′N 110°0′W on Victoria Island
68°37′N 110°0′W	Coronation Gulf	
68°6′N 110°0′W	Canada	Nunavut — Jameson Islands and the mainland Northwest Territories — from 65°10′N 110°0′W, passing through the Great Slave Lake; Saskatchewan — from 60°0′N 110°0′W, passing through Lake Athabasca, around 400m east of the Alberta border
49°0′N 110°0′W	United States	Montana; Wyoming — from 45°1′N 110°0′W; Utah — from 41°1′N 110°0′W; Arizona — from 37°0′N 110°0′W
31°20′N 110°0′W	Mexico	Sonora — passing just west of Ciudad Obregón at 27°29′N 109°56′W
27°4′N 110°0′W	Gulf of California	
24°8′N 110°0′W	Mexico	Baja California Sur
22°53′N 110°0′W	Pacific Ocean	
60°0′S 110°0′W	Southern Ocean	
74°27′S 110°0′W	Antarctica	Unclaimed territory — passing through the Walgreen Coast of Marie Byrd Land

== See also ==
- 109th meridian west
- 111th meridian west
