= 69th meridian east =

Line of longitude

69th meridian east (interactive map)

The meridian 69° east of Greenwich is a line of longitude that extends from the North Pole across the Arctic Ocean, Asia, the Indian Ocean, the Southern Ocean, and Antarctica to the South Pole.

The 69th meridian east forms a great circle with the 111th meridian west.

== From Pole to Pole ==
Starting at the North Pole and heading south to the South Pole, the 69th meridian east passes through:

Co-ordinates	Country, territory or sea	Notes
90°0′N 69°0′E	Arctic Ocean	
81°0′N 69°0′E	Barents Sea	
76°43′N 69°0′E	Russia	Severny Island, Novaya Zemlya, Arkhangelsk Oblast - for about 4 km at the easternmost tip of the island
76°40′N 69°0′E	Kara Sea	
72°41′N 69°0′E	Russia	Yamal Peninsula, Yamalo-Nenets Autonomous Okrug
68°56′N 69°0′E	Kara Sea	Baydaratskaya Bay
68°44′N 69°0′E	Russia	Yamalo-Nenetsia Khantia-Mansia (passing through Khanty-Mansiysk), Tyumen Oblast
55°26′N 69°0′E	Kazakhstan	North Kazakhstan Region For about 10 km
55°20′N 69°0′E	Russia	Tyumen Oblast For about 6 km
55°17′N 69°0′E	Kazakhstan	North Kazakhstan Region, Akmola Region, Karaganda Region, Turkistan Region
41°18′N 69°0′E	Uzbekistan	Tashkent Region, Sirdaryo Region
40°13′N 69°0′E	Tajikistan	Sughd Region For about 9 km
40°7′N 69°0′E	Uzbekistan	Sirdaryo Region For about 7 km
40°4′N 69°0′E	Tajikistan	Sughd Region, DCGJ Region, Khatlon Region
37°18′N 69°0′E	Afghanistan	Kunduz Province, Baghlan Province, Parwan Province, Kabul Province (passing just west of Kabul), Logar Province, Paktia Province, Paktika Province
31°37′N 69°0′E	Pakistan	Balochistan; Sindh
24°13′N 69°0′E	India	Gujarat
22°57′N 69°0′E	Indian Ocean	Gulf of Kutch
22°25′N 69°0′E	India	Gujarat
22°11′N 69°0′E	Indian Ocean	
48°41′S 69°0′E	French Southern and Antarctic Lands	Island of Kerguelen
49°43′S 69°0′E	Indian Ocean	
60°0′S 69°0′E	Southern Ocean	
67°55′S 69°0′E	Antarctica	Australian Antarctic Territory, claimed by Australia

== See also ==
- 68th meridian east
- 70th meridian east
