= King and Winge Shipbuilding Company =

Defunct shipyard in Seattle, Washington, U.S.

- Type: Private
- Industry: Shipbuilding
- Fate: Ceased shipbuilding
- Headquarters: Seattle, Washington, U.S.

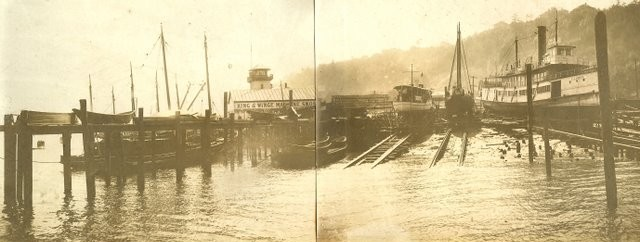
King and Winge shipyard, circa 1915, at West Seattle, looking south. The lookout tower of the first Seattle Yacht Club house can be seen over the building bearing the sign "King & Winge." On the right the sternwheeler Vashon has been hauled up on the marine railway.

The King and Winge Shipbuilding Company was an important maritime concern in the early 1900s on Puget Sound. The shipyard was located at West Seattle. The owners were Thomas J. King (1843–1925) and Albert M Winge. King was born in Boston and learned to build ships under the famous Donald McKay. He came to Puget Sound in about 1880, and worked in the shipyards of Hall Bros. and T.W. Lake before starting his own shipyard with Winge. King’s partner, Albert L. Winge was a native of Norway.

== Early marine construction ==
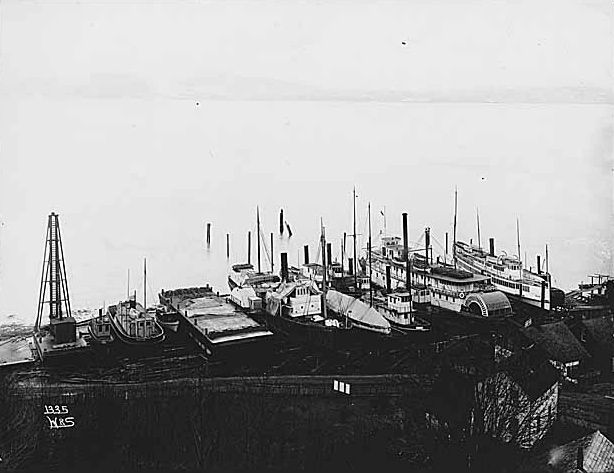
King and Winge shipyard in 1901.

In 1902, the passenger steamer Lady of the Lake, built at Lake Washington in 1897, burned and was rebuilt in 1905 by King and Winge as the tug Ruth. In 1909, the steam tug Elk was wrecked at Restoration Point but was salvaged and towed to King and Winge for repairs. In February 1911, the gas schooner E.L. Dwyer capsized at a pier in Seattle, as her cook, almost submerged in cold salt water, was incongruously shouting "Fire, fire!" She was repaired at King and Winge. Also in 1911, the cannery tender Catharine M., of the Pillar Point Packing Company, was wrecked in Alaska. She was salved sufficiently to be returned to Seattle in 1912 to the King and Winge shipyard, where she was rebuilt and refitted with a Union gasoline engine.

Seal hunting in the Arctic, which had come close to exterminating the herds, was banned in 1911 by the North Pacific Fur Seal Convention of 1911. This meant a number of sealing boats had to be converted to other duties, which included the schooner Casco, which many years before had been one of the boats on which Robert Louis Stevenson cruised the south seas. King and Winge converted installed a gasoline auxiliary engine in her and converted her to serve in the halibut fishery.

== Building of the King & Winge ==
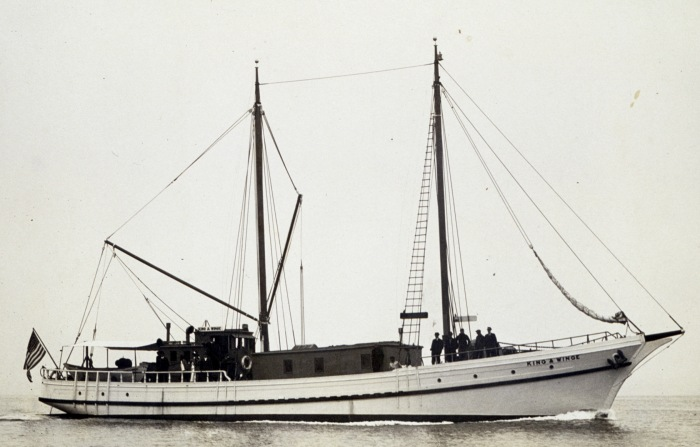
King & Winge

By 1914, King and Winge had built or acquired two power halibut schooners, the ex-Ragnhild, now named the Tom & Al (presumably named after Tom King and Al Winge) and the Gjoa. The Tom & Al, 65' long, was built in 1900 and was still in operation as late as 1962 as a dragger and whaler under Eben and Frank Parker of Astoria, Oregon.

In that year, the firm built to add to their halibut boats, their most well-known vessel, the King & Winge, originally a halibut schooner. King & Winge was considered the most modern halibut schooner yet constructed. She had a 140 horsepower (100 kW) engine, and electric lights.

== Later years ==
In 1919, the yard rebuilt the well-known steamer Bellingham (ex-Willapa, ex-General Miles) into a barge.

Thomas J. King died in 1924, but the shipyard continued, at least for a time. In 1925, King and Winge repowered the former steam ferry Puget with an oil engine, so the boat could be run on the Puget Sound Navigation Company’s Anacortes–Vancouver route. The yard name later changed to King Shipbuilding Co. About the same time the yard converted the steamboat Clatawa into an autocarrier.

== See also ==
- King & Winge (fishing schooner)
