= Nanuk (ship) =

1892 trading schooner, later used in films

History

United States
- Name: Ottilie Fjord
- Builder: H. D. Bendixsen, Eureka, California
- Completed: 1892
- Renamed: Nanuk

General characteristics
- Type: Schooner - full-rigged ship - Schooner
- Displacement: 261 Gross Tons
- Length: 40.3 m (132 ft)
- Beam: 9.6 m (31 ft)
- Draft: 2.95 m (9.7 ft)

The Nanuk (until 1923 Ottilie Fjord) was a trading and whaling schooner, which was later used in the Hollywood film industry as a historicising full-rigged ship for movies, among other things.

== Ottilie Fjord ==
The Ottilie Fjord was built in 1892 as a three-masted schooner with "steam-boat" rigging by H. D. Bendixsen in Eureka, California. The ship was owned by a coalition of 12 owners, mostly Humboldt County residents, and was named after the daughter Ottilie Fjord of one owner, Lorens Fjord, a ship chandler in San Francisco. The first voyage brought the lumber cargo of another owner, Mr. Isaac Minor, to San Luis Obispo.

Ottilie Fjord was used as a cargo sailor on the West Coast of the United States and in the Pacific. In October 1903, she was rescued by tugboats from distress at sea off the port of Honolulu (Hawaii) when she had run aground with a cargo of wood from San Francisco. In 1904 a voyage with a cargo of coal went from San Francisco to Topolobampo (Mexico) and ended in Eureka. A trip to Honolulu for the Charles Nelson Company in 1905 listed the cargo as nearly $7,000 (2023: $240,000).

In 1906, the Ottilie Fjord was sold to the Pacific States Trading Company. Subsequently, longer voyages were reported, e.g. 1912 to the arctic Bering Sea. During this trip she lost two anchors and 55 fathoms (101 m) of anchor chain in two storms.

On the morning of April 30, 1919, the Lick Observatory on Mount Hamilton recorded a strong earthquake lasting 45 minutes. After returning from Tonga, 8,600 km away, Captain Olsen of the Ottilie Fjord reported on July 21 that this earthquake, combined with a tidal wave, had killed and injured many people on the islands and caused severe destruction and a supply shortage. His ship was the only one to survive this catastrophe.

In April 1921, the Ottilie Fjord sailed to Pago Pago (American Samoa).

Captain C. T. Pedersen, an experienced Arctic explorer, sailed from Oakland with Ottilie Fjord in 1923 to trade furs and hunt walruses and whales in the Arctic Ocean. He was accompanied by his wife Olive, a Canadian nurse whom Pedersen had married after he had brought her to California in 1920 from a Presbyterian missionary hospital at Point Barrow, the northernmost point of the United States. Since then she had been the only woman in the crew of eighteen seafarers and whalers and had served as "The Doctor Lady From the Ship" for the crew and outsiders as well as a working crew member. That year, Ottilie Fjord completed Pedersen's most successful voyage: a shipment of blubber and furs valued at $1 million (2023: $17.7 million). Mrs. Pedersen is said to have prevented a possible failure by warning him of the danger of pack ice from the crow's nest in good time.

== As Nanuk in the Arctic ==
Returning from the summer 1924 voyage, now as Nanuk (Inuktitut for polar bear), Pedersen reported commerce with Soviet officials on Big Diomede island on the border between Alaska and Russia. After the conclusion of the negotiations, his business partners fined him $2,200 for "repeatedly trading without Soviet authorization", after which he returned to Alaska. The cargo of walrus ivory and furs worth $100,000 (2023: $1.8 million) made up for this. Pedersen also brought two live polar bears to sell to zoos.

Returning from her summer voyage of 1925, as an "auxiliary trading schooner", Nanuk brought to San Francisco a record load of furs worth $250,000 (2023: $4.3 million), along with ivory, salt, cod and mackerel. Mrs. Pedersen gave a detailed account of the arduous and dangerous ice passages and the health problems of the Eskimos from malnutrition and lack of disease resistance, such as tuberculosis, measles and respiratory diseases from colds to pneumonia, brought to the Arctic by hunters, traders and missionaries. On this voyage, an eighteen-year-old cabin boy hanged himself on the Nanuk shortly before arriving at Herschel Island, Canada, where he was buried.

In 1926, Nanuk passed into the ownership of the Swenson Fur Trading Company (New York and Seattle), which fulfilled an exclusive five-year contract with the Soviet Union until 1930 and delivered supplies to arctic outposts at places such as the Kolyma Gulf (Northern Siberia) in exchange for furs.

During a walrus hunt in 1928, the men of the Nanuk killed 297 animals in less than two weeks before the rudder and propeller were damaged in the ice and the Coast Guard cutter Northland came for assistance.

1929: fatal evacuation flight

In May 1929, Olaf Swenson, the owner, and his seventeen-year-old daughter Marion embarked on the Nanuk on a rescue mission for his motor ship Elisif which had been frozen in over the winter near North Cape (Siberia, today's Cape Schmidt). The Elisif came free. In September, Nanuk herself was caught in ice at Cape Schmidt and was trapped with six tons of fox and bear furs worth $1.5 million (2023: $26.6 million). After that, they prepared to overwinter. Alaskan Airways flew six men of the staff and some furs to Teller, Alaska; five remained on board, including the Swensons. During another flight on November 9, 1929, to supply the crew and to salvage more of the valuable cargo, pilot Carl Ben Eielson and mechanic Frank Borland went missing in a storm 60 miles from Cape Schmidt and were found dead after a weeks-long search operation - they had crashed. Nanuk was frozen in until July 1930 and returned to Seattle in August, undamaged (photo report).

== In Hollywood ==
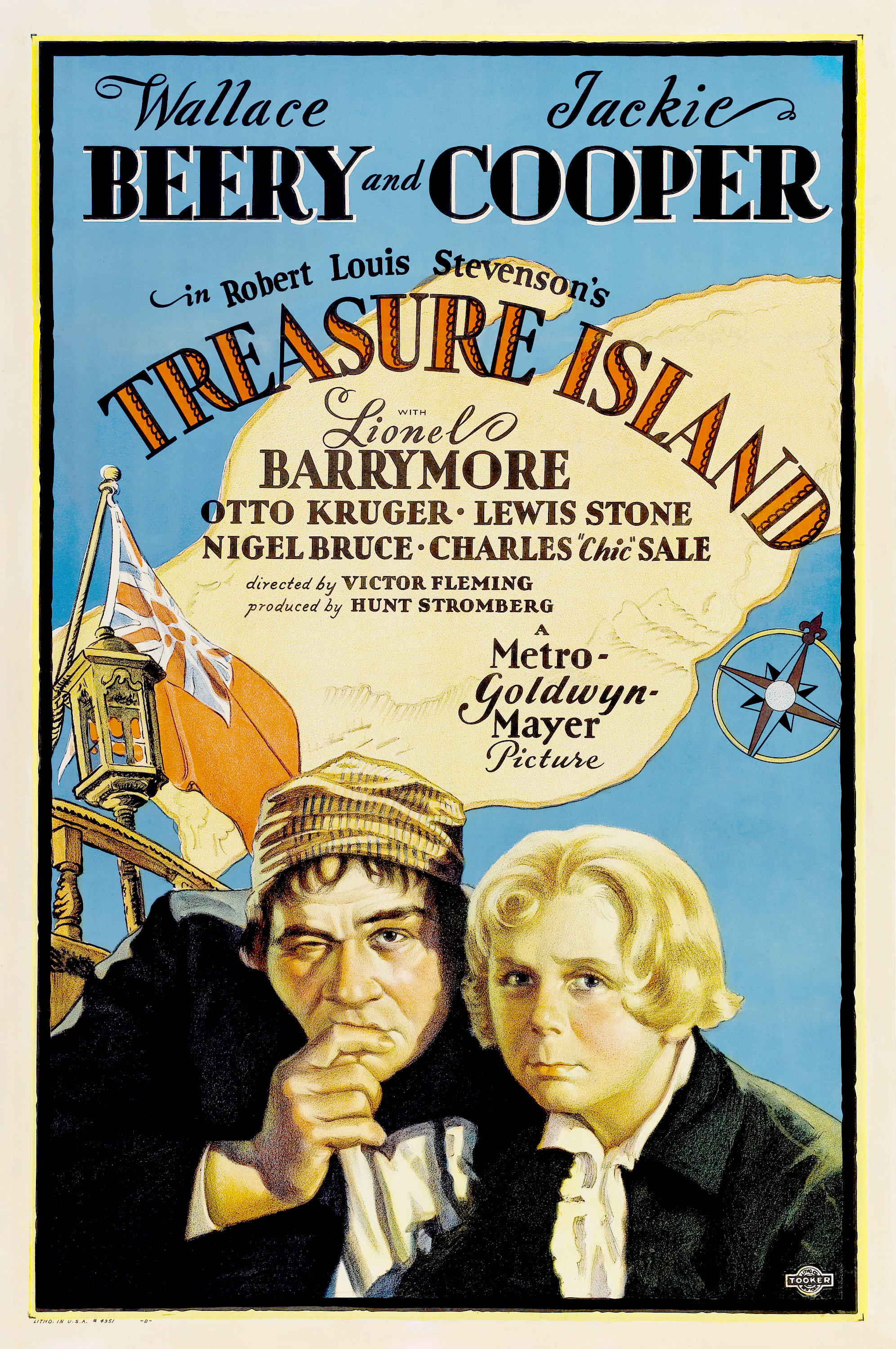
Treasure Island (1934)

In May 1932, Metro-Goldwyn-Mayer chartered the motor ship Nanuk as a transport ship to Teller (Alaska) for location shoots of the movie Eskimo. The production left nothing to chance: Artificial snow, blowers and Eskimo actors were taken along. Nanuk went on hunting and whale expeditions at times during filming, and was ice-bound again during the year of filming. MGM also bought the Nanuk from Swenson and, after returning to Los Angeles, had her converted into the pirate ship Hispaniola for the film Treasure Island. The schooner thus became a full-rigged ship with cannons.

Immediately afterwards, Nanuk slipped into the role of a British Admiralty frigate: In Mutiny on the Bounty she appeared as HMS Pandora. Together with Lily as a replica of the HMAV Bounty she went as far as Tahiti for filming.

According to JaySea, the Nanuk was later sold to the Mexican government (Cia Naviera Nacional del Pacifico), which got rid of the masts and operated her as a motor ship until at least 1960.

Some photos of the Nanuk can be found on JaySea's blog The First Bounty Replica.
