= King & Winge (fishing schooner) =

Sailing ship built in Seattle, Washington, US

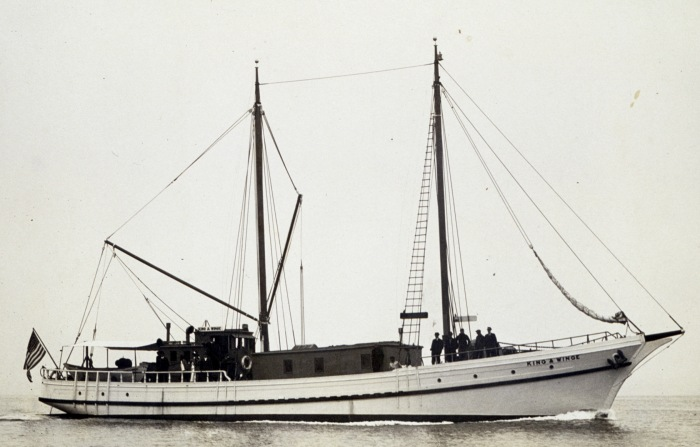
- King & Winge, Southeast Alaska, 1916, USCGS

History

United States
- Name: King & Winge
- Namesake: Thomas King and Al Winge
- Owner: King and Winge Shipbuilding Company, 1914; National Independent Fisheries Company, 1916
- Operator: Various
- Port of registry: Seattle
- Builder: King & Winge Shipbuilding Company, West Seattle
- Launched: 1914
- Maiden voyage: Alaska 1914
- Home port: Seattle
- Fate: Sold
- Owner: Columbia Bar Pilots Association
- Acquired: 1924
- Renamed: Columbia (1924)
- Refit: 1944 as CGR-2469
- Home port: Astoria, Oregon
- Fate: Sold
- Owner: Dr. Clyde Parlova 1958; Jack Elsbree 1961; Wilburn Hall 1962; Richard Maher 1987
- Renamed: King & Winge 1958
- Home port: Seattle 1961; Kodiak AK 1962; Homer AK 1987
- Fate: Sank in Bering Sea 1994

General characteristics
- Type: Motor schooner
- Tonnage: 143 tons
- Length: 96.7 ft
- Beam: 19.6 ft
- Depth of hold: 9.6 ft
- Propulsion: 140 HP Corliss gasoline engine
- Sail plan: Schooner
- Propulsion: 6-cylinder Atlas-Imperial Diesel, 1924

King & Winge was one of the most famous ships ever built in Seattle, Washington, United States. Built in 1914, in the next 80 years she had participated in a famous Arctic rescue, been present at a great maritime tragedy, and been employed as a halibut schooner, a rum runner, a pilot boat, a yacht, and a crabber. She sank in high seas, without loss of life, in 1994.

== Construction ==
King & Winge was originally a powered halibut schooner built by the King and Winge shipyard in West Seattle in 1914. She was designed by Albert M. Winge, co-owner of the shipyard. Her dimensions were 143 tons, 97' length on the deck (110' overall), 19.6' beam and 9.7 depth of hold. As built she was fitted with a 140 horsepower (100 kW) Corliss gasoline engine and an electric lighting system. She had two 60' high masts, and carried nine halibut dories. The construction was very strong, with 4x4 ½ inch oak frames, each set six inches apart, and sheathed with planking three inches (76 mm) thick, covered with another layer of ironbark sheathing. The schooner was divided into four watertight compartments, her hull was heavily braced, and her bow was nosed with steel plates for ice work.

== Rescue of the Stefansson expedition ==
While her builders had planned to put King & Winge in the halibut fishery, she was chartered before construction was complete by the Hibbard-Swenson Co. for an expedition to the Arctic for hunting, trading, and making a motion picture.

Captain Olaf Swenson and C. L. Hibbard took King & Winge up to Nome, where they found the United States Revenue Cutter Service cutter Bear. Earlier that season, Bear had attempted to rescue the Stefansson expedition survivors, stranded in the Arctic since the sinking of their ship Karluk, crushed by ice in the Chukchi Sea in January. Bear had been forced to abandon the rescue effort by weather conditions and had returned to Nome to refuel. Swenson returned to Seattle for business reasons, but Hibbard and the navigator A.P. Jochkimson decided to go to Wrangel Island to look for the survivors, leaving a day ahead of the Bear.

Once arriving at Rodgers Harbor, on September 7, they found and took on board the three survivors there, and then went through huge ice floes to Waring Point, where they took on board nine more. Sailing back south, they met the Bear and turned over the rescued passengers to the revenue cutter.

The account above follows the H.W. McCurdy Marine History of the Pacific Northwest. A somewhat different account, with Swenson on the King & Winge with Jochimsen and commanding the umiak that landed on Wrangel Island is given by Burt McConnell, a contemporary eyewitness, and other sources. The origin of this difference is unclear.

== Charter work and fishing ==
King & Winge was chartered by the United States Coast and Geodetic Survey for two seasons of wire-drag hydrographic survey work in Alaska. Subsequent to this assignment she was sold to the National Independent Fisheries Company in 1916 and worked in the halibut fishery.

== Wreck of Princess Sophia ==
In October 1918, King & Winge was present at one of the great tragedies of Alaskan maritime history, the wreck of Princess Sophia. On October 23, 1918, coming south down Lynn Canal south from Skagway in a snowstorm, Princess Sophia had struck Vanderbilt Reef, not far from the Sentinel Island Light. She was hung up high on the reef for a considerable time, and her captain apparently thought that she could be floated off at the next high tide. Consequently, no attempt was made to transfer the passengers to King & Winge or the lighthouse tender Cedar, which, with a large number of smaller vessels, had heard of the wreck and gone to Sophia's aid. The sea conditions were bad, and any attempted transfer would have been risky in any case. Overnight, however, the wind came up, and Sophia was washed off Vanderbilt Reef and sank with all 343 people aboard. Only the upper part of her mast remained above the water. All that Cedar and King & Winge could do was pick up floating bodies and take them to Juneau.

== Rum-running career ==
King & Winge's history in the early 1920s is reported to be obscure. In the fall of 1921, National Independent Fisheries Company chartered her to the Cape Flattery Pilots Association, to operate as a pilot boat at the western entrance of the Strait of Juan de Fuca. In the meantime, she had become legally encumbered as security for a loan. In 1922, she was sold to Northwest Trust & Savings Bank to satisfy the loan. In 1923, she was sold at auction to E.L. Skeel, otherwise unidentified. Skeel was possibly a pseudonym or stand-in for Roy Olmstead and T. J. Clarke, two former policeman who had opted for a substantially more lucrative career in the rum-running business, Prohibition having recently come into law. Clarke and Olmstead tried and failed to reregister the King & Winge as a Canadian vessel, and so King & Winge passed into the possession of the Columbia Bar Pilot's Association.

== Columbia bar pilot boat ==
King and Winge was the Columbia Bar pilot boat from 1924 to 1958. She was called Columbia by the pilot's association. In 1924, she was converted from gasoline to diesel power. She served under the command of Captain F.E. Craig, who estimated he had made more than 50,000 crossings of the bar in her. In 1944, she returned to Seattle to be refit to Coast Guard standards as CGR-2469. Many of the men who worked on the refit had helped build her.

== Later history ==
In 1958, Dr Clyde C. Parlova of Astoria, Oregon bought King & Winge from the pilot's association, with the objective of restoring her as a sailing ship. How much progress Dr. Parlova made is not entirely known. Among other things, he restored her masts and the name King & Winge and paneled the pilothouse with Tennessee cherry wood. King & Winge was the official flagship of the 1958 Astoria Regatta. In late 1961, Jack Elsbree, of Seattle, a retired airline pilot, bought the King & Winge from him and brought her up to Lake Union in Seattle, with the same objective, that is, of restoring her to her original state. In 1962, she was sold to Wilburn Hall, who took her to Kodiak, Alaska for crab fishing. Hall is credited with pioneering the modern king crab fishery in the Bering Sea. In 1987 she was sold to Richard Maher of Homer, AK, who operated her as a longliner for halibut and blackcod and as a tender, as well as a crabber.

King & Winge survived into modern times, sinking in 18-foot (5.5 m) waves in the Bering Sea, 22 miles (35 km) West of St. Paul Island on 23 February 1994. Attempts to save the flooding vessel failed and all four crew members were rescued by the United States Coast Guard cutter Hamilton.
