= Miyar Valley =

Valley in the Western Himalayas

Miyar Valley is a remote and scenic valley located in the Western Himalayas. It is a part of the Lahaul Range, located between Pir Panjal and Zanskar Range. The valley is nearly 75 km long and stretches between Udaipur (2649 m) and Kang La Pass (5468 m). More than 50% (568 km^{2}) of area of the Miyar Valley (975.7 km^{2}) is covered in glaciers. Kang La at the head of Miyar Valley is one of the extreme points of India.

== Administration and climate ==
Administratively, the valley belongs to the district of Lahaul and Spiti (Himachal Pradesh). Temperatures and precipitation in the Miyar Valley vary widely. The annual average values are respectively: at the mouth of the valley – Udaipur (2649 m) 9.4 °C and 1057 mm; in its middle part – Sucto village (3448 m) 5 °C and 605 mm; and in higher parts (alpine and nival level) average annual temperature always stays below 0 °C.

== Demography ==
According to Saini the soil cover of the Miyar Valley can be classified into three types: Himalayan Alluvial Soils (Group B), Mountain and Hill Soils, High Altitude Meadow Soil. The valley is inhabited by Tharanga people which are influenced by Tibetan Buddhism. Only a few hundred people live concentrated in 16 villages – among others in Urgos (226), Tingrat (171), Ghumpa (45) Khanjar (48) and Sucto (37) – excluding Udayapur. Inhabitants are engaged in mainly farming and pasturing.

Due to the belief and influence of Tibetan Buddhism, the population is largely vegetarian and lacto-vegetarian.

== Economy ==
The economy of the valley is dominated by extensive farming. A short growing season (May–September) and low-quality soil limit agricultural production. Among the main food crops are peas, barley, buckwheat, seed potato. Kuth (Saussurea lappa) and mannu (Inula racemosa) are grown for medicinal use. Agriculture is accompanied by typical pastoral breeding (sheep, goats) and cattle breeding (cows, horses, donkeys).

== Tourism ==
Miyar Valley is attractive to explorers and mountaineers for being one of the few remaining "white spaces" on the map. In 2012 Michal Apollo, Phil Varley and Marek Zoladek made the first summit of an unclimbed mountain, naming it Forgotten Peak.

== See also ==
- List of extreme points of India
