= Northeast Siberia Company =

American mining company

The Northeast Siberia Company (NESC) was an American company established in 1902 by a retired Russian colonel named Vonlyarlyarsky, but composed primarily of Chicagoans. The company's chartered purpose was to prospect for gold in the Chukotka region of Russia.

The first problem encountered by the company once it was founded was finding miners willing to work in Chukotka. Because the concession was on imperial land, it could not be divided into claims like in North America. As a result of this, the company could not legally offer any property rights to miners, only salaries. Russian miners were very hard to come by, so the company had to recruit Americans with false promises of lucrative gold stakes with generous terms (half of the gold plus half of the gold-producing land).

The NESC operated vessels of its own, including the gasoline schooner Barbara Hernster. In 1905, the Barbara Hernster struck a reef and was sunk near Providence Bay while on a journey to recover furs and ivory worth more than a million dollars. Its captain, adventurer Olaf Swenson, became a well-known trader in Anadyr.

In 1906 it was reported that the NESC was forbidden by the Russian government from any activities other than mining, such as fur trading. The company may also have been involved in illegally trading alcohol. Also in 1906, American miners working for the NESC reportedly discovered a steel and leather mail coat, along with a helmet and coins which may have been left by Cossack explorers in the mid-1600s.

In 1909, the company sent out a dispatch that there was a prison riot in Yakutsk resulting in the deaths of at least four guards, and that escaped prisoners were attempting to flee to Alaska. Later that year the Russian government banned foreign investment in Chukotka in an effort to stop the "unscrupulous exploitation" and mistreatment of the Chukchi people by the Americans.

The company's concession in Russia was ended in 1910.
