= Linaluk Island =

Island in the Northwest Territories, Canada

- Location within Northwest Territories Location within Canada

Geography
- Location: Northern Canada
- Coordinates: 70°18′21″N 113°2′51″W
- Archipelago: Arctic Archipelago

Administration
- Canada
- Territory: Northwest Territories

Demographics
- Population: Uninhabited

Linaluk Island is one of the islands in the Arctic Archipelago in the Northwest Territories, Canada. It is located in the south-east of Prince Albert Sound, just north of the Wollaston Peninsula, Victoria Island.
