= Guhar Moti =

Guhar Mota/Guhar Moti Ghuar Mota, Guher Moti
- village
- Location in Gujarat, India Guhar Mota/Guhar Moti (India)
- Coordinates: 23.713°N 68.5424°E
- Country: India
- State: Gujarat
- District: Kachchh
- Taluka: Lakhpat
- Panchayat: Narayan Sarovar

Population (2011)
  - Total: 242

Languages
  - Official: Gujarati, Hindi
- Time zone: UTC+5:30 (IST)
- Vehicle registration: GJ-12
- Website: gujaratindia.com

Guhar Moti is situated near Narayan Sarovar, in Kutch district in Gujarat. It is located near the Narayan Sarovar Village and the Koteshwar temple, at 23.6352°N 68.5424°E.

The village comes under the administration of the Narayan Sarovar panchayat.

== See also ==
- List of extreme points of India
