= Brock Island =

Uninhabited island in the Northwest Territories, Canada

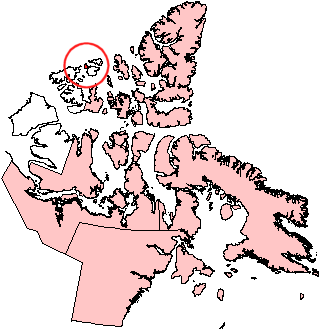
- Brock Island, Northwest Territories

- Location within Northwest Territories Location within Canada

Geography
- Location: Northern Canada
- Coordinates: 77°51′N 114°27′W
- Archipelago: Queen Elizabeth Islands; Arctic Archipelago
- Area: 764 km^{2} (295 sq mi)
- Length: 41 km (25.5 mi)
- Width: 39 km (24.2 mi)

Administration
- Canada
- Territory: Northwest Territories

Demographics
- Population: Uninhabited

Brock Island is one of the uninhabited members of the Queen Elizabeth Islands of the Arctic Archipelago located in the Northwest Territories, Canada. Located at 77°51'N 114°27'W, it measures 764 km^{2} (295 sq mi) in size and lies close to Mackenzie King Island. The first known sighting of the island by a European was by Vilhjalmur Stefansson in 1915 and it was later named for Reginald W. Brock, Dean of Applied Science at the University of British Columbia.

== Ireland's Eye ==
John Arrowhead's map of the Arctic in 1859, depicting Ireland's Eye as the northernmost point of Arctic exploration per Sir John Franklin's sledging expedition of 1853.

Ireland's Eye was described as an uninhabited islet located about 300 m in diameter about 15 km east of Brock Island. It was identified in 1853 between the 12th and 15th of June, by Leopold McClintock during a sledging expedition which branched from the Admiralty's 1852 Expedition. During the 105 days of sledging, McClintock traveled 1210 miles. During this expedition, he charted the west coast of Prince Patrick Island and Ireland's Eye, the northernmost point of McClintock's travels. It was described as being composed of gravel and fragments of large gneiss.

The islet was named after Ireland's Eye, an island 40 miles away from McClintock's birthplace of Dundalk. The name was later confirmed on December 31st, 1910.

However, during the Canadian Arctic Expedition, 1913–1916, as Vilhjalmur Stefansson explored what was called "First Land", an island later named Brock Island, Stefansson did not find Ireland's Eye; other than reefs synonymous with the rest of the Polynia Islands, there was a lack of geographic landmarks aligning with what McClintock described. In an analysis of Stefansson's expedition from F.A. McDiarmid in 1923, he believed that the Ireland's Eye discovered by McClintock was actually a part of Brock Island due to the mist obscuring the area and the unavailability of observational equipment. Despite the doubts which painted Ireland's Eye as a non-independent landmark of the Arctic, the evidence McDiarmid proposed was inconclusive in proving that Ireland's Eye was in fact a portion of Brock Island.
