= List of extreme points of India =

The extreme points of India include the coordinates that are further north, south, east or west than any other location in India; and the highest and the lowest altitudes in the country. The northernmost point claimed by India is in territory disputed between India and Pakistan, and administered partially by both. With the exception of Kanyakumari, the southernmost location of mainland India, all other extreme locations are uninhabited.

The latitude and longitude are expressed in decimal degree notation, in which a positive latitude value refers to the northern hemisphere, and a negative value refers to the southern hemisphere. Similarly, a positive longitude value refers to the eastern hemisphere, and a negative value refers to the western hemisphere. The coordinates used in this article are sourced from Google Earth, which makes use of the WGS84 geodetic reference system. Additionally, a negative altitude value refers to land below sea level.

== Extreme points ==
Extreme points of India marked on the map of India

The northernmost point claimed by India lies in the Pakistani-administered territory of Gilgit-Baltistan, which India claims as a part of the union territory of Ladakh. The northernmost point administered by India lies in the union territory of Ladakh, which is claimed by Pakistan as a part of the autonomous territory of Azad Kashmir. This list provides the northernmost point as claimed by India; the northernmost disputed point that is administered by India; and the northernmost undisputed point in India. This case also applies to the highest elevated regions.

India's easternmost state is Arunachal Pradesh. Most of the state is claimed by China as part of Tibet Autonomous Region, though administered by India, The easternmost of Indian-administered territory is located in this disputed region. Consequently, this list mentions both the disputed and undisputed easternmost points in India.

All astronomical calculations are performed with respect to a Central Station at longitude 82°30’ East, latitude 23°11’ North.

Extreme points of India
Heading	Location	Administrative entity	Bordering entity	Coordinates (Note: Coordinates obtained from Google Earth. Google Earth makes use of the WGS84 geodetic reference system.)	Ref(s)
North (disputed, administered)	East of Indira Col at Siachen Glacier	Ladakh	Xinjiang, China	35.674521°N 76.844485°E	
North (disputed, claimed)	East of Kilik Pass in the Karakoram Mountains on Xinjiang-Gilgit-Baltistan border	Gilgit-Baltistan, Pakistan	Xinjiang, China	37.08586°N 74.70291°E	
North (undisputed)	North of Kang La at the northern end of Miyar Valley in Lahaul and Spiti district	Himachal Pradesh	Ladakh	33.25615°N 76.79877°E	
South	Indira Point on the southernmost end of Great Nicobar Island of the Nicobar Islands	Andaman and Nicobar Islands	Indian Ocean	6.74678°N 93.84260°E	
South (mainland)	Cape Comorin near Kanyakumari	Tamil Nadu	Indian Ocean	8.06890°N 77.55230°E	
East (disputed, administered)	Diphu Pass (east of Kibithu and Dong in Anjaw district, near India-Myanmar-Tibet tri-junction)	Arunachal Pradesh	Kachin State, Myanmar	28.01168°N 97.39564°E	
East (undisputed)	Chaukan Pass, east of Vijaynagar in Changlang district	Arunachal Pradesh	Kachin State, Myanmar	27.13611°N 97.16575°E	
East (Island)	Narcondam Island in Andaman and Nicobar Islands is India's easternmost Island	Andaman and Nicobar Islands	Kachin State, Myanmar	27.13611°N 97.16575°E	(Note: Narcondam Island is India's easternmost Island, but not the easternmost point.)
West	Southwest tip of Sir Creek in Kutch district	Gujarat	Indus River Delta, Sindh, Pakistan	23.6261°N 68.1941°E	(Note: This muddy swampy island at the southwest tip of Sir Creek is also the westernmost Island of India. Guhar Moti is westernmost inhabited settlement, but not the westernmost point of India, because it is east of Sir Creek.)

== Altitudes ==
Highest and lowest altitudes of India
Extremity	Name	Altitude	Location	State	Coordinates	Ref(s)
Highest (undisputed)	Kangchenjunga	8,586 m (28,169 ft)	Eastern Himalaya on the India-Nepal border	Sikkim	27.70250°N 88.14833°E	
Highest (disputed, claimed)	K2	8,611 m (28,251 ft)	Karakoram on border between Gilgit-Baltistan (administered by Pakistan) and Xinjiang (administered by China)	Gilgit-Baltistan, Pakistan	35.88250°N 76.51333°E	
Highest (undisputed and entirely within India)	Nanda Devi	7,816 m (25,643 ft)	Garhwal Himalaya	Uttarakhand	30.37667°N 79.97083°E	
Lowest	Kuttanad	−2.2 m (−7.2 ft)	Alappuzha district	Kerala	9.15360°N 76.47300°E	

== See also ==
India related

- Borders of India
- Geography of India
- Extreme points of Asia
- Exclusive economic zone of India
- List of disputed territories of India
- Outline of India

Other related topics

- Extreme points of Indonesia
- Extreme points of Myanmar
- Extreme points of Bangladesh
- Extreme points of Thailand
