= Wilkins Strait =

Strait in Canada

Wilkins Strait (78°10′N 112°00′W) is a natural waterway through the central Canadian Arctic Archipelago. It is mostly in the Northwest Territories, although its eastern extremity is in Nunavut. It separates Borden Island (to the north) from Brock Island (to the south-west) and Mackenzie King Island (to the south).
