= Vilhjalmur Stefansson =

Canadian-born explorer (1879–1962)

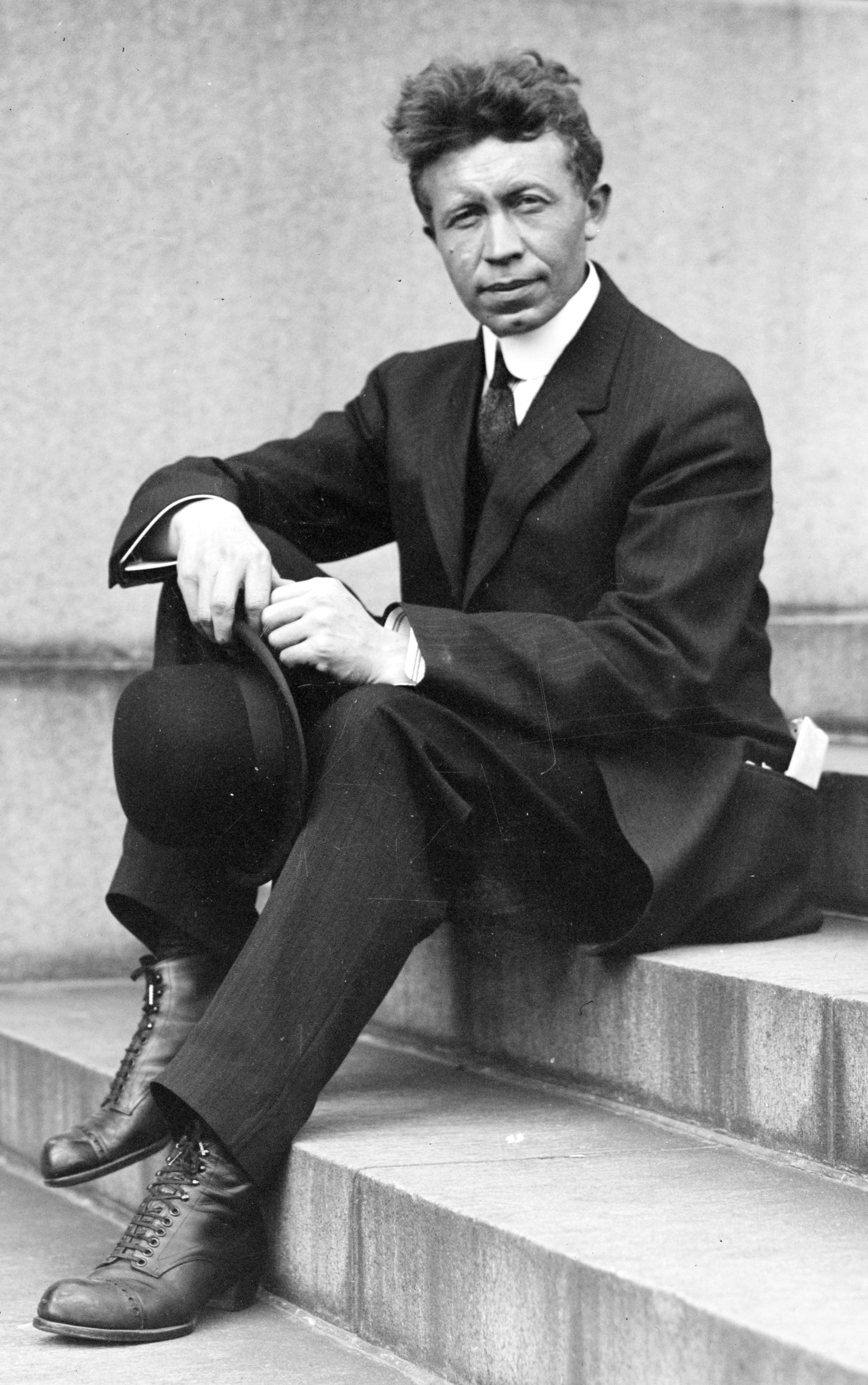
- Stefansson, c. 1915
- Born: November 3, 1879; Arnes, Manitoba, Canada
- Died: August 26, 1962 (aged 82); Hanover, New Hampshire, U.S.
- Education: Harvard University; University of Iowa; University of North Dakota
- Occupations: Professor; Arctic explorer
- Organization: President of the History of Science Society from 1945–46
- Known for: Exploring the Arctic

Vilhjalmur Stefansson (born William Stephenson; November 3, 1879 – August 26, 1962) was a Canadian-American Arctic explorer and ethnologist. He was born in Manitoba, Canada.

== Early life and education ==
Stefansson, born William Stephenson, was born at Arnes, Manitoba, Canada, in 1879. His parents had emigrated from Iceland to Manitoba two years earlier. After losing two children during a period of devastating flooding, the family moved to Dakota Territory in 1880 and homesteaded a mile southwest of the village of Mountain in Thingvalla Township of Pembina County.

He was educated at the universities of North Dakota and of Iowa (A.B., 1903). During his college years, in 1899, he changed his name to Vilhjalmur Stefansson. He studied anthropology at the graduate school of Harvard University, where for two years he was an instructor.

== Early explorations ==
In 1904 and 1905, Stefansson did archaeological research in Iceland. Recruited by Ejnar Mikkelsen and Ernest de Koven Leffingwell for their Anglo-American Polar Expedition, he lived with the Inuit of the Mackenzie River Delta during the winter of 1906–1907, returning alone across country via the Porcupine and Yukon rivers.

Under the auspices of the American Museum of Natural History in New York City, he and Dr. Rudolph Martin Anderson undertook the ethnological survey of the central Arctic coasts of the shores of North America from 1908 to 1912.

In 1908, Stefansson made a decision that would affect the rest of his time in Alaska: he hired Natkusiak, an Inuk guide, who would remain with him as his primary guide for the rest of his Alaska expeditions. At the time he met Natkusiak, the Inuk guide was working for Capt. George B. Leavitt, a Massachusetts whaling ship captain and friend of Stefansson's who sometimes brought him replenishments of supplies from the American Museum of Natural History.

Christian Klengenberg is first credited to have introduced the term "Blonde Eskimo" to Stefansson just before Stefansson's visit to the Inuit inhabiting southwestern Victoria Island, Canada, in 1910. Stefansson, though, preferred the term “Copper Inuit“ (although there was already a group of people known by that name) . Adolphus Greely in 1912 first compiled the sightings recorded in earlier literature of fair-haired Arctic natives and in 1912 published them in the National Geographic Magazine entitled "The Origin of Stefansson's Blonde Eskimo". Newspapers subsequently popularised the term "Blonde Eskimo", which caught more readers' attention despite Stefansson's preference for “Copper Inuit”. Stefansson later referenced Greely's work in his writings and the term "Blonde Eskimo" became applied to sightings of fair-haired Inuit from as early as the 17th century.

== Loss of the Karluk and rescue of survivors ==
Stefansson organized and directed the Canadian Arctic Expedition, 1913–1916 to explore the regions west of Parry Archipelago for the Government of Canada. Three ships, the Karluk, the Mary Sachs, and the Alaska were employed.

Stefansson left the main ship, the Karluk, when it became marooned in the ice in August/September 1913. Stefansson's explanation was that he and five other expedition members left to go hunting to provide fresh meat for the crew. However, William Laird McKinley and others who were left on the ship suspected Stefansson left deliberately, anticipating that the ship would be carried off by moving ice, as indeed happened. The ship, with Captain Robert Bartlett of Newfoundland and 24 other expedition members aboard, drifted westward with the ice and was eventually crushed. It sank on January 11, 1914. Four of the survivors made their way to Herald Island but eventually died there, possibly from carbon monoxide poisoning, before they could be rescued. Four others, including Alistair Mackay who had been part of the Nimrod Expedition (British Antarctic Expedition, 1907–09), led by Sir Ernest Shackleton, tried reaching Wrangel Island on their own but perished. The remaining members of the expedition, under command of Captain Bartlett, made their way to Wrangel Island where three of them died. Bartlett and the Inuk hunter Kataktovik made their way across sea ice to Siberia to get help. The remaining survivors were picked up by the King & Winge, an American fishing schooner and the USRC Bear, a cutter of the United States Revenue Cutter Service in September 1914.

Stefansson resumed his explorations by sledge over the Beaufort Sea, leaving Collinson Point, Alaska in April 1914. A supporting sledge turned back 75 mi (121 km) offshore, but he and two men continued onward on one sledge, living largely by his rifle on polar game for 96 days until his party reached the Mary Sachs in the autumn. Stefansson continued exploring until 1918.

== Wrangel Island fiasco ==
In 1921, he encouraged and planned an expedition for four young men to colonise Wrangel Island north of Siberia, where the eleven survivors of the 22 men on the Karluk had lived from March to September 1914. Stefansson had designs for forming an exploration company that would be geared towards individuals interested in touring the Arctic island.

Stefansson originally wanted to claim Wrangel Island for the Canadian government. However, due to the dangerous outcome of his initial trip to the island, the government refused to assist with the expedition. He then wanted to claim the land for Britain but the British government rejected the claim when it was made by the young men of the expedition. The raising of the British flag on Wrangel Island, an acknowledged Russian territory, caused an international incident.

The four young men Stefansson recruited, Americans Frederick Maurer, E. Lorne Knight, and Milton Galle, and Canadian Allan Crawford, were inadequately experienced and ill-equipped for the expedition. All perished on the island or in an attempt to get help from Siberia across the frozen Chukchi Sea. The only survivors were Ada Blackjack, an Iñupiaq woman the men had hired in Nome, Alaska, as a seamstress and taken with them as a cook, and the expedition's cat, Vic. Ada Blackjack had taught herself survival skills and cared for the last man on the island, E. Lorne Knight, until he died of scurvy. Blackjack was not rescued until 1923, having spent a total of two years on Wrangel Island. Stefansson drew the ire of the public and the families of the men who perished for having sent such ill-equipped young explorers to Wrangel. His reputation was severely tainted by this disaster, along with that of the Karluk.

== Discoveries ==
Stefansson produced the first written records of several places, such as Brock, Mackenzie King, Borden, Meighen, Eight Bears Island and Lougheed Islands and the edge of the continental shelf. He extended the works of Francis Leopold McClintock. From April 1914 to June 1915 he lived on the ice pack. Stefansson continued his explorations leaving from Herschel Island on August 23, 1915.

On January 30, 1920, The Pioche Record reported that Stefansson discovered a lost cache from the Leopold McClintock 1853 expedition on Melville Island. Clothing and food from the cache was in excellent condition despite the harsh Arctic conditions.

In 1921, he was awarded the Founder's Medal of the Royal Geographical Society for his explorations of the Arctic. He was also an elected member of the American Philosophical Society and the American Academy of Arts and Sciences.

== Later career ==
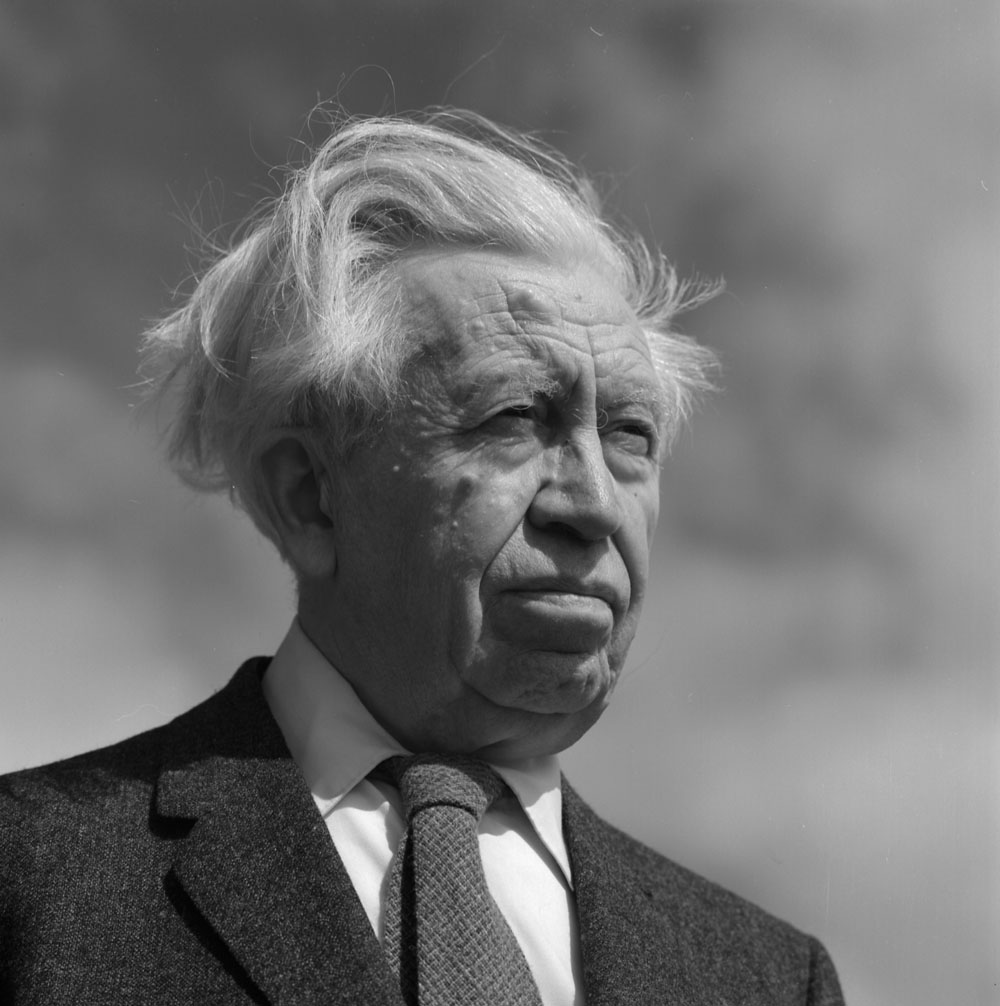
Stefansson in 1961

Stefansson remained a well-known explorer for the rest of his life. Late in life, through his affiliation with Dartmouth College (he was Director of Polar Studies), he became a major figure in the establishment of the United States Army's Cold Regions Research and Engineering Laboratory (CRREL) in Hanover, New Hampshire. CRREL-supported research, often conducted in winter on the forbidding summit of Mount Washington, was key to developing matériel and doctrine to support alpine conflict.

Stefansson joined the Explorers Club in 1908, four years after its founding. He later served as Club President twice: 1919–1922 and 1937–1939. In the all-male Club, the Board drew attention under Stefansson's reign when it put forth an amendment to its by-laws in 1938 that read: "A Woman's Roll of Honor shall be instituted to which the Board of Directors may name women of the United States and Canada in recognition of the noteworthy achievements and writings in the field of the Club's interests, primarily exploration." Perhaps to comfort fellow members, the article added, "This Woman's Roll of Honor shall be quite outside the Club's organisation but shall correspond in dignity to the Honorary Class of (male) members within it." His continued support of women in anthropology is demonstrated in his 1939–1941 mentorship of Gitel Steed as she undertook research on diet and subsistence for his two-volume Lives of the Hunters, from which she began a dissertation on the topic of hunter-gatherer.

While living in New York City, Stefansson was one of the regulars at Romany Marie's Greenwich Village cafés During the years when he and novelist Fannie Hurst were having an affair, they met there when he was in town. In 1940, at the age of 62, he met 28-year-old Evelyn Schwartz at Romany Marie's; she became his secretary and they married soon after.

In 1941, he became the third honorary member of the American Polar Society. He served as president of the History of Science Society from 1945–46.

== Legacy ==
Stefansson's personal papers and collection of Arctic artifacts are maintained and available to the public at the Dartmouth College Library.

Stefansson is frequently quoted as saying that "An adventure is a sign of incompetence..."

Roald Amundsen stated he was "the greatest humbug alive" referring to his mismanagement of the Wrangel Island fiascos.

On May 28, 1986, the United States Postal Service issued a 22 cent postage stamp in his honour.

== Political affiliations ==
In the 1930s, pro-Soviet movements were created in the US that aimed primarily to provide support for the Soviet project to establish a Jewish socialist republic in the Birobidzhan region in the far east of the Soviet Union. One of the organizations prominent in this campaign was the American Committee for the Settlement of Jews in Birobidjan (or Ambijan) formed in 1934. A tireless proponent of settlement in Birobidzhan, Stefansson appeared at countless Ambijan meetings, dinners, and rallies, and proved an invaluable resource for the group. Ambijan produced a 50-page Year Book at the end of 1936, full of testimonials and letters of support. Among these was one from Stefansson, who was now also listed as a member of Ambijan's Board of Directors and Governors: "The Birobidjan project seems to me to offer a most statesmanlike contribution to the problem of the rehabilitation of eastern and central European Jewry," he wrote.

Ambijan's national conference in New York on November 25–26, 1944 pledged to raise $1 million to support refugees in Stalingrad and Birobidzhan. Prominent guests and speakers included New York Representative Emanuel Celler, Senator Elbert D. Thomas of Utah, and Soviet Ambassador Andrei Gromyko. A public dinner, attended by the delegates and their guests, was hosted by Vilhjalmur and his wife, Evelyn Stefansson. Vilhjalmur was selected as one of two vice-presidents of the organization.

However, with the growing anti-Soviet feeling in the country after World War II, "exposés" of Stefansson began to appear in the press. In August 1951, he was denounced as a communist before a Senate Internal Security subcommittee by Louis F. Budenz, a Communist-turned-Catholic. Stefansson himself may have by then had some second thoughts about Ambijan since his posthumously published autobiography conspicuously made no mention of his work on its behalf. The same is true of his otherwise very-complete obituary in The New York Times of August 27, 1962.

== Advocacy of meat-based diet ==
Stefansson is reported to have eaten an exclusive meat-based diet during his arctic explorations. During these expeditions, Stefansson ate bear liver, seal liver and raw fish. Stefansson commented that he had become fond of consuming raw fish and fermented whale oil. Raw seal liver has a vitamin C value of up to 35mg.

Stefansson argued that it was possible for people of European descent to live on an Eskimo diet for long periods of time and the reason that explorers had developed scurvy was because they were not following the Eskimo's dietary habits. Arctic physiologist Kåre Rodahl has written that Stefansson's diet on his arctic explorations should not be confused with the Eskimo diet as the Eskimos in addition to meat and fat also "eat considerable quantities of entrails and plant food in the form of land plants and sea algae" and during the summer, marine algae makes up 50% of their vitamin C supply.

In 1926, Clarence W. Lieb who examined Stefansson stated that he "eats anything placed before him, but his tendency is to eat more meat than the average person. Since returning to civilization, he has had a tendency to constipation and has infrequent colds, but is otherwise never ill".

Stefansson and his fellow explorer Karsten Anderson agreed to undertake an official study to demonstrate that they could eat an exclusive meat diet for a year. They were observed at a laboratory setting during intervals at Bellevue Hospital. The book The Unseen Power: Public Relations states that Pendelton Dudley, once considered the "dean of public relations", convinced the American Meat Institute to fund the study. The results were published in 1929, with the following conclusions:

1. It's possible for man to live for long periods on meat alone.
2. Clinical observations and laboratory tests revealed no evidence to show that these men suffered any ill effects from their prolonged use of an exclusive meat diet.
3. The diet was moderately high in protein and very high in fat.
4. Lean meat alone was not well tolerated.
5. A prolonged mild ketosis occurred.
6. The ability of the body to use carbohydrate was reduced temporarily.
7. The diet was expensive, caused some social inconveniences, and was not one to be recommended for universal use.

In 1935, Stefansson authored an article in Harper's Magazine titled Adventures in Diet outlining his meat-based diet in the arctic. It was re-published as a booklet by the Institute of American Meat Packers.

== Literature ==
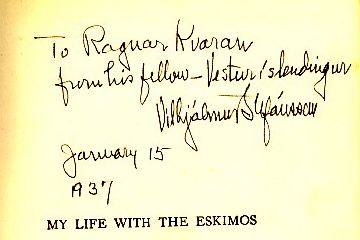
Inscription

- Stefansson, Vilhjalmur. My Life with the Eskimo; The Macmillan Company, New York, 1912.
- Stefansson, Vilhjalmur. Stefánsson-Anderson Expedition, 1909–12; Anthropological Papers, AMNH, vol. XIV., New York, 1914.
- Stefansson, Vilhjalmur. The Friendly Arctic; The Macmillan Company, New York, 1921.
- Stefansson, Vilhjalmur. The Standardization of Error; W. W. Norton & Company, Inc., New York, 1927.
- Stefansson, Vilhjalmur. Unsolved Mysteries of the Arctic; The Macmillan Company, New York, 1938.
- Stefansson, Vilhjalmur. Not by Bread Alone; The Macmillan Company, New York, 1946.
- Stefansson, Vilhjalmur. The Fat of the Land; The Macmillan Company, New York, 1956.
- Stefansson, Vilhjalmur (1958). Northwest to Fortune: The Search of Western Man for a Commercially Practical Route to the Far East (First ed.). New York: Duell, Sloan and Pearce. LCCN 58-12267. OCLC 250005656.
- Stefansson, Vilhjalmur. Discovery – the autobiography of Vilhjalmur Stefansson; McGraw-Hill Book Company, New York, 1964.
- Stefansson, Vilhjalmur. Cancer: Disease of civilization? An anthropological and historical study; Hill and Wang, Inc., New York, 1960.
- Stefansson, Vilhjalmur (ed.). Great Adventures and Explorations; The Dial Press, 1947.
- Diubaldo, Richard. Stefansson and the Canadian Arctic; McGill-Queen's University Press, Montreal, 1978.
- Stefansson, Vilhjalmur. Lessons in living from the Stone Age.
- Hunt, William R. Stef: A Biography of Vilhjalmur Stefansson, Canadian Arctic explorer; University of British Columbia Press, Vancouver, 1986. ISBN 0-7748-0247-2
- Jenness, Stuart Edward. The Making of an Explorer: George Hubert Wilkins and the Canadian Arctic Expedition, 1913–1916; McGill-Queen's Press – MQUP, 2004. ISBN 0-7735-2798-2
- Niven, Jennifer. The Ice Master: The Doomed 1913 Voyage of the Karluk, Hyperion Books, 2000.
- Niven, Jennifer. Ada Blackjack: A True Story Of Survival In The Arctic, Hyperion Books, 2003. ISBN 0-7868-8746-X
- Pálsson, Gísli. Writing on Ice: The Ethnographic Notebooks of Vilhjalmur Stefansson; Dartmouth College Press, University Press of New England, Hanover, 2001. ISBN 1-58465-119-9
- Pálsson, Gísli. "The legacy of Vilhjalmur Stefansson", the Stefansson Arctic Institute (and individual authors), 2000.
