= Borden Island =

Uninhabited island in the Arctic Archipelago

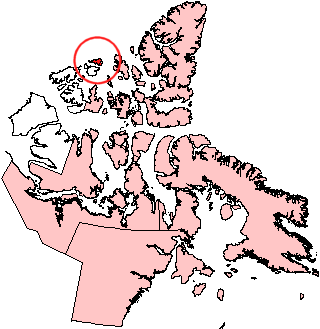
- Borden Island, Northwest Territories and Nunavut

- Location within Northwest Territories Location within Nunavut Location within Canada

Geography
- Location: Northern Canada
- Coordinates: 78°30′03″N 111°13′12″W
- Archipelago: Queen Elizabeth Islands; Arctic Archipelago
- Area: 2,795.95 km^{2} (1,079.52 sq mi) (2026)
- Area rank: 31st in Canada & 173rd worldwide
- Length: 94 km (58.4 mi)
- Width: 82 km (51 mi)

Administration
- Canada
- Territory: Nunavut; Northwest Territories

Demographics
- Population: Uninhabited

Borden Island is an uninhabited, low-lying island in the Queen Elizabeth Islands of northern Canada. Split between Nunavut and the Northwest Territories, it is the northernmost point of the latter.

== Geography and history ==
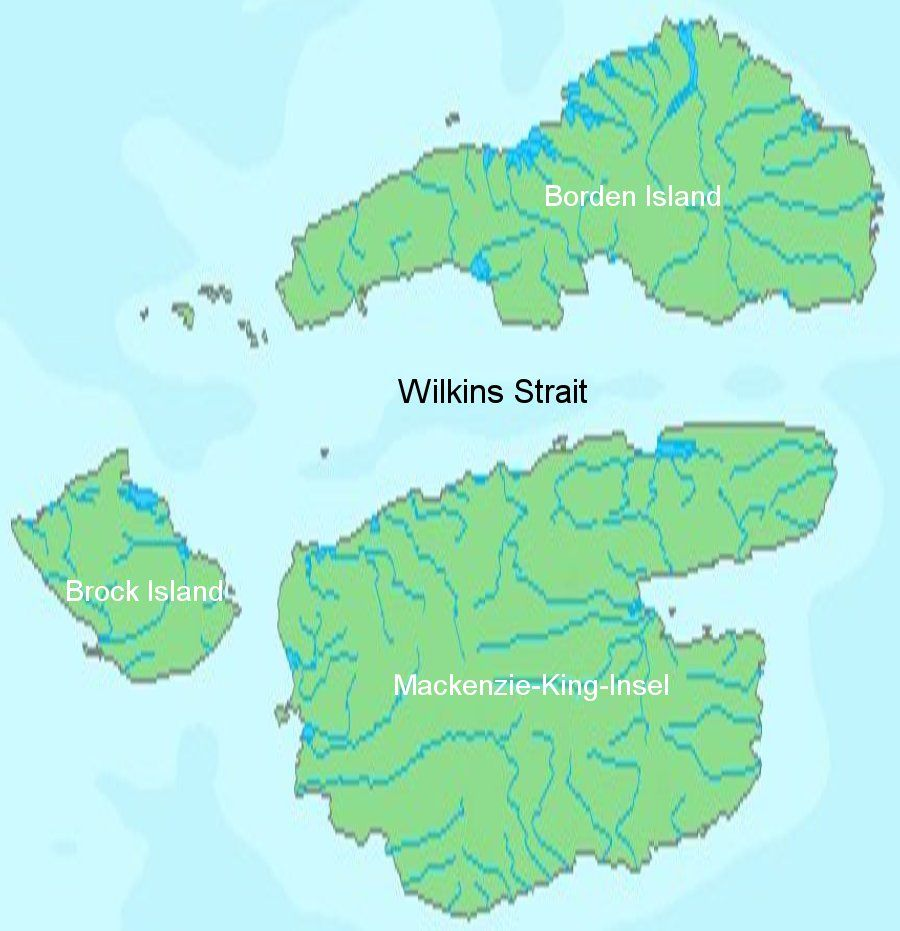
Borden Island, shown at the northeast of the map

With an area of 2,795.95 km^{2} (1,079.52 sq mi) in size, 93.9 km (58.3 mi) long and 82 km (51 mi) wide, Borden is the 173rd largest island in the world, and Canada's 31st largest island. It lies north of Mackenzie King Island and is similarly split between the Northwest Territories (larger portion) and Nunavut, with the border running along the 110th meridian west. The first known sighting of the island by Europeans was by Vilhjalmur Stefansson in 1916, it was originally described as a single landmass. However, in 1947, during an aerial survey by the Royal Canadian Air Force the island was found to be two islands divided by Wilkins Strait.

== Naming ==
The island is named for Robert Borden, Prime Minister of Canada 1911–1920.
