= Mackenzie King Island =

Uninhabited island in the Arctic Archipelago

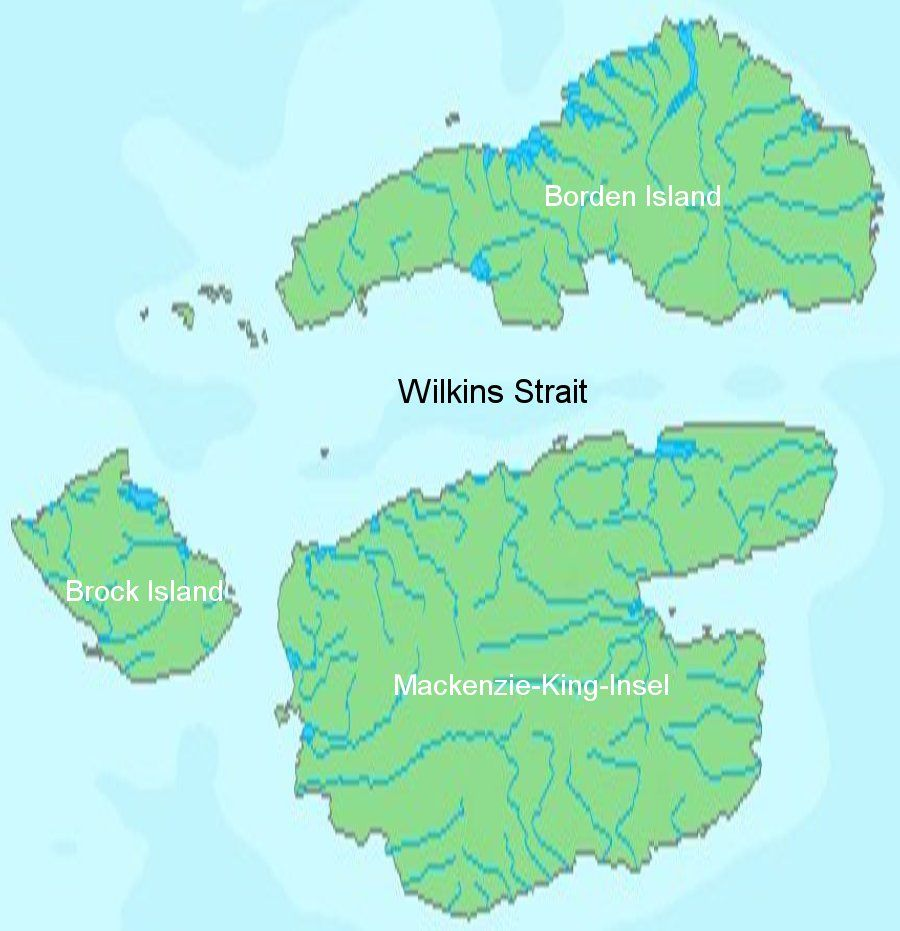
- Mackenzie King Island with Brock and Borden Island

- Location within Northwest Territories Location within Nunavut Location within Canada

Geography
- Location: Northern Canada
- Coordinates: 78°02′N 109°50′W
- Archipelago: Queen Elizabeth Islands; Arctic Archipelago
- Area: 5,056.27 km^{2} (1,952.24 sq mi) (2026)
- Area rank: 26th in Canada & 116th worldwide
- Length: 61 mi (98 km)
- Width: 60 mi (100 km)
- Highest elevation: 112 m (367 ft)

Administration
- Canada
- Territory: Northwest Territories; Nunavut

Demographics
- Population: 0

Mackenzie King Island is one of the uninhabited Queen Elizabeth Islands in northern Canada. It lies north of Melville Island and south of Borden Island, and like them is divided when it comes to administration. Most of the island is in Northwest Territories, while its easternmost portion lies in Nunavut. The border runs along the 110th meridian west. Mackenzie King has an area of 5,056.2 km^{2} (1,952.2 sq mi), 97 km (60 mi) long in the northeast or 76 km (47 mi) in the southeast and 97 km (60 mi) wide, making it the 116th largest island in the world, and Canada's 26th largest island.

== History ==
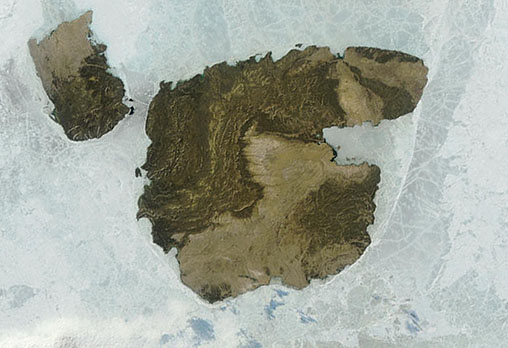
Terra MODIS satellite image of Mackenzie Island, Canada. Brock Island is on the left

The first known visit to the island was by Vilhjalmur Stefansson in 1915, and it was later named for William Lyon Mackenzie King.
