= 63rd meridian west =

Line of longitude

63rd meridian west

The meridian 63° west of Greenwich is a line of longitude that extends from the North Pole across the Arctic Ocean, Greenland, North America, the Atlantic Ocean, South America, the Southern Ocean, and Antarctica to the South Pole.

The 63rd meridian west forms a great circle with the 117th meridian east.

In the Canadian province of Quebec, the 63rd meridian is used as a time zone boundary, with all land to its west falling within the Eastern Time Zone and all land to its east in the Atlantic Time Zone (never used DST).

== From Pole to Pole ==
Starting at the North Pole and heading south to the South Pole, the 63rd meridian west passes through:

Co-ordinates	Country, territory or sea	Notes
90°0′N 63°0′W	Arctic Ocean	
83°22′N 63°0′W	Lincoln Sea	
82°35′N 63°0′W	Canada	Nunavut — Ellesmere Island
81°54′N 63°0′W	Nares Strait	
81°12′N 63°0′W	Greenland	Daugaard-Jensen Land
76°20′N 63°0′W	Baffin Bay	
70°0′N 63°0′W	Davis Strait	
67°17′N 63°0′W	Canada	Nunavut — Baffin Island
65°35′N 63°0′W	Davis Strait	
65°18′N 63°0′W	Canada	Nunavut — Muingmak Island
65°16′N 63°0′W	Davis Strait	
60°0′N 63°0′W	Atlantic Ocean	Labrador Sea
58°53′N 63°0′W	Canada	Newfoundland and Labrador — Labrador; Quebec — from 52°0′N 63°0′W
50°18′N 63°0′W	Gulf of Saint Lawrence	Jacques Cartier Strait
49°44′N 63°0′W	Canada	Quebec — Anticosti Island
49°12′N 63°0′W	Gulf of Saint Lawrence	
46°25′N 63°0′W	Canada	Prince Edward Island
46°10′N 63°0′W	Gulf of Saint Lawrence	Hillsborough Bay
46°4′N 63°0′W	Canada	Prince Edward Island
46°3′N 63°0′W	Gulf of Saint Lawrence	Northumberland Strait
45°47′N 63°0′W	Canada	Nova Scotia
44°42′N 63°0′W	Atlantic Ocean	
18°16′N 63°0′W	Anguilla	
18°14′N 63°0′W	Caribbean Sea	Passing between Saint Martin (at 18°7′N 63°1′W) and Île Tintamarre (at 18°7′N 62°59′W), Saint Martin; Passing just east of Sint Maarten (at 18°3′N 63°1′W); Passing just west of Saint Barthélemy (at 18°3′N 63°1′W)
17°32′N 63°0′W	Netherlands	Island of Sint Eustatius
17°30′N 63°0′W	Caribbean Sea	Passing just west of the island of Saint Kitts, Saint Kitts and Nevis (at 17°22′N 62°52′W); Passing just east of the Los Testigos Islands, Venezuela (at 11°22′N 63°4′W)
10°43′N 63°0′W	Venezuela	
3°37′N 63°0′W	Brazil	Roraima; Amazonas — from 2°1′N 63°0′W; Rondônia — from 7°59′S 63°0′W
12°51′S 63°0′W	Bolivia	
22°0′S 63°0′W	Argentina	
41°7′S 63°0′W	Atlantic Ocean	
60°0′S 63°0′W	Southern Ocean	Passing just west of Smith Island, South Shetland Islands — claimed by Argentina, Chile and United Kingdom (at 63°5′S 62°44′W)
64°32′S 63°0′W	Antarctica	Anvers Island — claimed by Argentina, Chile and United Kingdom
64°36′S 63°0′W	Southern Ocean	
64°47′S 63°0′W	Antarctica	Claimed by Argentina, Chile and United Kingdom

== See also ==
- 62nd meridian west
- 64th meridian west
