= 62nd meridian west =

Line of longitude

62nd meridian west

The meridian 62° west of Greenwich is a line of longitude that extends from the North Pole across the Arctic Ocean, Greenland, North America, the Atlantic Ocean, South America, the Southern Ocean, and Antarctica to the South Pole.

The 62nd meridian west forms a great circle with the 118th meridian east.

== From Pole to Pole ==
Starting at the North Pole and heading south to the South Pole, the 62nd meridian west passes through:

Co-ordinates	Country, territory or sea	Notes
90°0′N 62°0′W	Arctic Ocean	
83°24′N 62°0′W	Lincoln Sea	
82°30′N 62°0′W	Canada	Nunavut — Ellesmere Island
82°5′N 62°0′W	Nares Strait	
81°8′N 62°0′W	Greenland	Daugaard-Jensen Land
76°4′N 62°0′W	Baffin Bay	
70°0′N 62°0′W	Davis Strait	
67°3′N 62°0′W	Canada	Nunavut — Baffin Island
66°17′N 62°0′W	Davis Strait	Exeter Sound
66°2′N 62°0′W	Canada	Nunavut — Baffin Island
66°1′N 62°0′W	Davis Strait	Passing just east of Angijak Island, Nunavut, Canada (at 65°39′N 62°7′W)
60°0′N 62°0′W	Atlantic Ocean	Labrador Sea
57°55′N 62°0′W	Canada	Newfoundland and Labrador — Labrador; Quebec — from 52°0′N 62°0′W
50°12′N 62°0′W	Gulf of Saint Lawrence	Jacques Cartier Strait
49°22′N 62°0′W	Canada	Quebec — Anticosti Island
49°4′N 62°0′W	Gulf of Saint Lawrence	
47°17′N 62°0′W	Canada	Quebec — Magdalen Islands
47°13′N 62°0′W	Gulf of Saint Lawrence	
46°28′N 62°0′W	Canada	Prince Edward Island — easternmost tip
46°27′N 62°0′W	Gulf of Saint Lawrence	Northumberland Strait
45°52′N 62°0′W	Canada	Nova Scotia
44°59′N 62°0′W	Atlantic Ocean	
17°45′N 62°0′W	Caribbean Sea	Passing just west of the island of Barbuda, Antigua and Barbuda (at 17°42′N 61°53′W); Passing just west of the island of Antigua, Antigua and Barbuda (at 17°6′N 61°54′W); Passing just east of the island of Montserrat (at 16°41′N 62°9′W); Passing just west of the island of Basse-Terre, Guadeloupe, France (at 16°16′N 61°48′W); Passing just west of the island of Grenada (at 12°0′N 61°48′W)
10°43′N 62°0′W	Venezuela	Paria Peninsula
10°39′N 62°0′W	Gulf of Paria	Passing just west of the island of Trinidad, Trinidad and Tobago (at 10°3′N 61°55′W)
9°56′N 62°0′W	Venezuela	
4°10′N 62°0′W	Brazil	Roraima; Amazonas — from 1°11′S 62°0′W; Rondônia — from 8°48′S 62°0′W
13°21′S 62°0′W	Bolivia	
20°12′S 62°0′W	Paraguay	
23°0′S 62°0′W	Argentina	Mainland, Isla Bermejo and Isla Trinidad
39°10′S 62°0′W	Atlantic Ocean	
60°0′S 62°0′W	Southern Ocean	
63°15′S 62°0′W	South Shetland Islands	Low Island — claimed by Argentina, Chile and United Kingdom
63°19′S 62°0′W	Southern Ocean	
64°0′S 62°0′W	Antarctica	Liège Island — claimed by Argentina, Chile and United Kingdom
64°4′S 62°0′W	Southern Ocean	
64°41′S 62°0′W	Antarctica	Claimed by Argentina, Chile and United Kingdom

== See also ==
- 61st meridian west
- 63rd meridian west
