= Joe Island (Greenland) =

Island in Greenland

Joe Ø
- Location within Greenland
- Interactive map of Joe Island

Geography
- Location: Kennedy Channel/Hall Basin; Nares Strait
- Coordinates: 81.2512°N 63.5295°W
- Area: 1.1 km^{2} (0.42 sq mi)
- Length: 1.2 km (0.75 mi)
- Width: 1 km (0.6 mi)
- Highest elevation: 100 m (300 ft)

Administration
- Greenland
- Municipality: Avannaata

Demographics
- Population: 0

Joe Island (Danish: Joe Ø) is an island of the Nares Strait, Greenland. Administratively it belongs to the Avannaata municipality.

Joe Island was named after Joe (Ipiirvik or Ebierbing), an Inuk guide who accompanied Charles Francis Hall in the 1871 Polaris expedition.

== Geography ==
Joe Island lies in the Kennedy Channel at the limit of the Hall Basin. It is located about 4 km north of Cape Morton, off the northern end of the Petermann Peninsula, to the northwest of the mouth of Petermann Fjord. The waters around the island are icebound most of the year. Joe Island is the northernmost point of the Avannaata municipality.

Since Joe Island is at the mouth of Petermann Fjord, it is an obstacle to large icebergs that calve off of Greenland's glaciers. Most such icebergs break apart when colliding with the island.

The island is mushroom-shaped. It has an area of 1.1 km^{2} and an elevation of 100 meters.

Map of part of Ellesmere Island and far Northern Greenland.

== See also ==
- List of islands of Greenland
- List of islands named after people

== Bibliography ==
- George Nares Narrative of a voyage to the Polar Sea during 1875–6 in H.M. ships 'Alert' and 'Discovery'
