= Washington Land =

Peninsula in northwestern Greenland

- Location within Greenland

Geography
- Location: NW Greenland
- Coordinates: 80°30′N 64°30′W
- Adjacent to: Aleqatsiaq Fjord; Kennedy Channel; Kane Basin; Peabody Bay; Cass Fjord
- Length: 140 km (87 mi)
- Width: 90 km (56 mi)
- Highest elevation: 1,221 m (4006 ft)
- Highest point: John Brown Ice Cap

Administration
- Greenland (Denmark)

Demographics
- Population: Uninhabited

Washington Land is a peninsula in northwestern Greenland. It is a part of the Avannaata municipality.

Washington Land was named after the first president of the United States, George Washington, by Elisha Kent Kane during the Second Grinnell Expedition from 1853 to 1855.

== History ==
Washington Land was explored in the 19th century. Traditionally it was one of the hunting grounds of the Inuit, but there are archaeological remains of more permanent human habitation in ancient times.

The last settlement in Washington Land was Nunatami, on the coast of Gonioceras Bay, which was inhabited by two Inughuit families from 1917 to 1920. Today it is seasonally used as a hunting ground for polar bears by hunters from Qaanaaq.

A base camp for geological exploration and resource exploration was established in the valley known as Jægerstien, north of Kastrup Elv at the head of Torvegade Fjord, which is part of the larger Cass Fjord. It is also used as a depot to get to areas further north such as Petermann Glacier.

At the end of 2019, the Australian mining company Ironbark Zinc Limited returned an exploration license for zinc deposits in Washington Land.

== Geography ==
Washington Land is located to the west of Daugaard-Jensen Land. It is bounded by the Kane Basin in the southwest, the Kennedy Channel in the northwest, and Peabody Bay in the south. Crozier Island, Franklin Island and Hans Island are located off Lafayette Bay in its NW shore. Aleqatsiaq Fjord and Fossil Bay border its NW shore, while Bessel Fjord borders its NE shore. Hannah Island is located in the northeast in the mouth of Bessel Fjord.

The Cass Fjord and Benton Bay form the peninsula's southeastern coastline, across which is the Humboldt Glacier and beyond it Inglefield Land. Cape Jackson is Washington Land's south-westernmost headland and protrudes at the junction of the Kennedy Channel and the Kane Basin. The southernmost headland is Cape Forbes, the southeastern-most point is Cape Lyngbæk, near the western lake of the Romer Lakes, and the northernmost headland is Cape Bryan.

Directly off Cape Jackson is a recurring patch of open water in winter and spring that is believed to be the northernmost sensible heat polynya on earth. It was first described during the Second Grinnell Expedition, lead by Elisha Kent Kane.

Washington Land is a largely unglaciated peninsula. Washington Land has several large ice caps, including Henryk Arctowski Ice Cap in the southeast and John Brown Ice Cap in the north. The peninsula is mountainous and includes Adams Bjerg located in the southwest, Nordlyset in the southeast, and the Pentamerus Range in the north. Cliffs make up the majority of Washington Land’s coastline, dropping up to 700 m (2,296 ft) in elevation into Kane Basin and Kennedy Channel. Named cliffs, each in southern Washington Land, include: Taliilannguaq Klipper, located west of Nygaard Bay, Poulsen Klipper, north of Cass Fjord, and Ismågereden, south of Cass Fjord.

Washington Land and Daugaard-Jensen Land are commonly grouped together making the “greater Washington Land Group,” since there is no major geographical barrier between them.

== Flora and fauna ==
Washington Land has a high-Arctic polar desert climate. Vegetation is poor with only 61 species of vascular plants recorded. Land animals in the region are scarcer than elsewhere in Greenland, with Arctic hares being the only consistently observed land animals. In addition, Arctic foxes, northern collared lemmings, stoats and Greenland wolves are relatively rare on the peninsula, while Daugaard-Jensen Land to the east has very little or no reported land animals. Walruses are seasonally concentrated around southern Washington Land in Peabody Bay and in Cass Fjord, while a narwhal summer ground exists in Hall Basin to the north. Reindeer and musk oxen used to inhabit Washington Land and Daugaard-Jensen Land but died out possibly around the same time as musk oxen in Inglefield Land.

20 species of birds have been documented in Washington Land: red-throated diver, snow goose, eider, long-tailed duck, ptarmigan, ringed plover, knot, sanderling, Baird’s sandpiper, purple sandpiper, turnstone, Arctic skua, long-tailed skua, Glaucous gull, Arctic tern, black guillemot, little auk, raven, Arctic redpoll and snow bunting. Most are migratory species that breed in the summer.

Live musk oxen were seen in Washington Land in 1962 and in 2015, suggesting a small population may still inhabit the peninsula, although there is no current evidence of a permanent population, as these individuals are considered strays from Ellesmere Island that crossed Kennedy Channel, which is about 26 km (16 mi) to the northwest at the closest point. Washington Land is also within reach of Peary caribou from Ellesmere Island, and they have historically been documented in Hall Land to the northeast, but no live Peary caribou have ever been documented in Washington Land.

Map of part of Ellesmere Island and far Northern Greenland.

== See also ==
- Washington Land Group

== Bibliography ==
- H.P. Trettin (ed.), Geology of the Innuitian Orogen and Arctic Platform of Canada and Greenland. Geological Survey of Canada (1991) ISBN 978-0660131313
- Ole Bennike, Jon Feilberg: Bird observations in Washington Land, North Greenland, in 1999. Dansk Orn. Foren. Tidsskr. 98 (2004): 192–195
- Ole Bennike: Late Quaternary history of Washington Land, North Greenland. Boreas, Vol. 31 (2002), 260–272. Oslo. ISSN 0300-9483
