= Repulse Harbour =

Harbour in Northern Greenland

- Repulse Havn
- Location in Greenland
- Location: Arctic
- Coordinates: 82°5′N 59°10′W
- Ocean/sea sources: Robeson Channel, Lincoln Sea
- Basin countries: Greenland
- Max. length: 2 km (1.2 mi)
- Max. width: 3 km (1.9 mi)
- Frozen: Most of the year
- Settlements: Uninhabited

Repulse Harbour (Danish: Repulse Havn) is a bay in northern Greenland. To the northwest it opens into the Lincoln Sea. Administratively it is a part of the Northeast Greenland National Park.

== History ==
The bay was named in September 1871 by Captain Hall during the Polaris expedition. Hall was looking for a wintering harbor and pushed northward with his ship after checking the bay, but could not go beyond 82° 10′ latitude on account of the ice and returned. Hall examined the bay again but found it unsuitable for wintering.

There is a large cairn standing on one of the entrance points of the bay that was erected in April 1876 by senior Lieutenant Lewis Beaumont of the British Arctic Expedition. Lieutenant Beaumont's dogsled party were sent out by Captain Nares to explore the north coast of Greenland, having set out from Discovery Harbour on the Ellesmere Island side of the Robeson Channel. When the party returned to Repulse Harbour its members were severely ill with scurvy and had to abandon some of their equipment at the cairn site.

== Geography ==
Repulse Harbour is a small inlet that opens to the northwest 20 km to the northeast of Cape Brevoort, the eastern point of the mouth of Newman Fjord. It lies on the northern shore of Nyeboe Land, surrounded by low-lying terrain. The cliffs of the Black Horn Klint rise to the east of the bay along the coast.

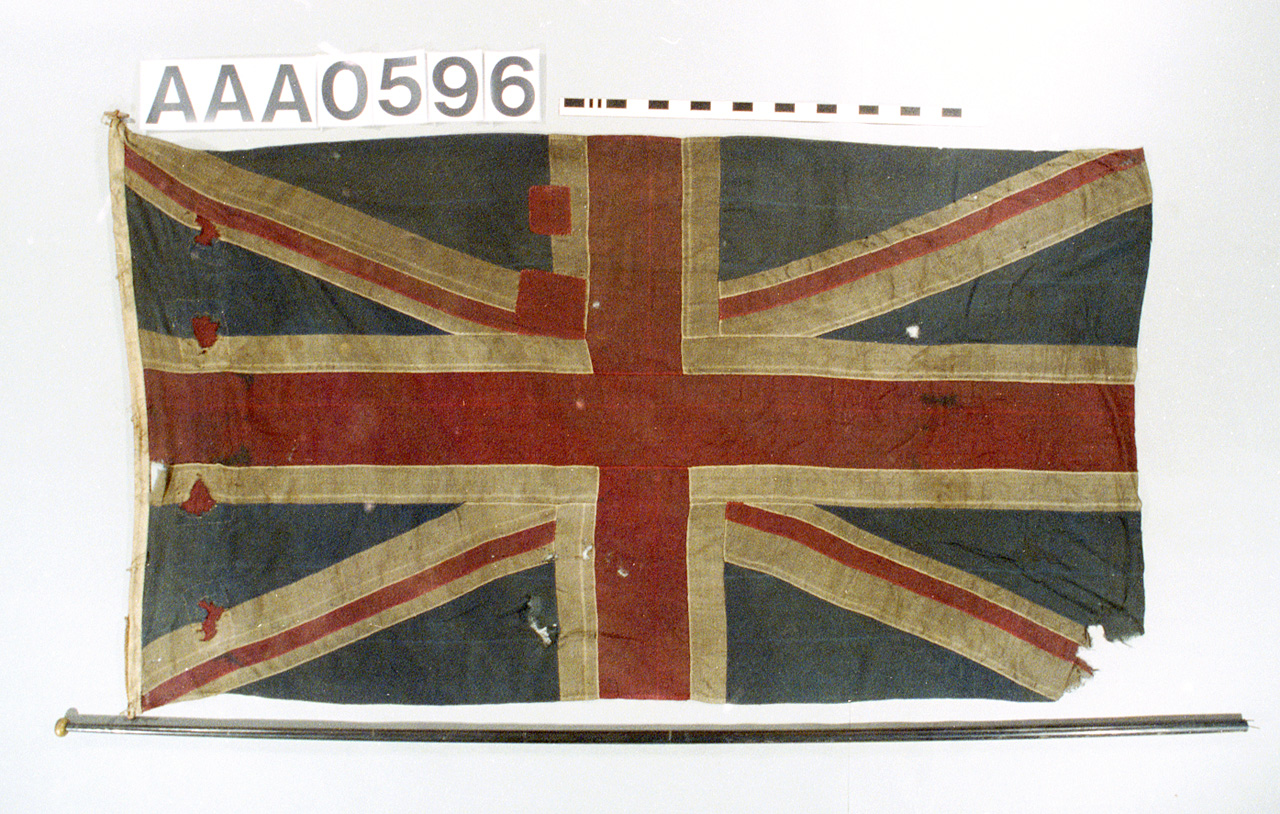
British flag left at a depot on Repulse Harbour by Lieutenant Lewis Beaumont during Captain Nares' British Arctic Expedition.

== See also ==
- Cartographic expeditions to Greenland
