= Philippine Standard Time =

Time zone used in the Philippines (UTC+08:00)

- Time zone
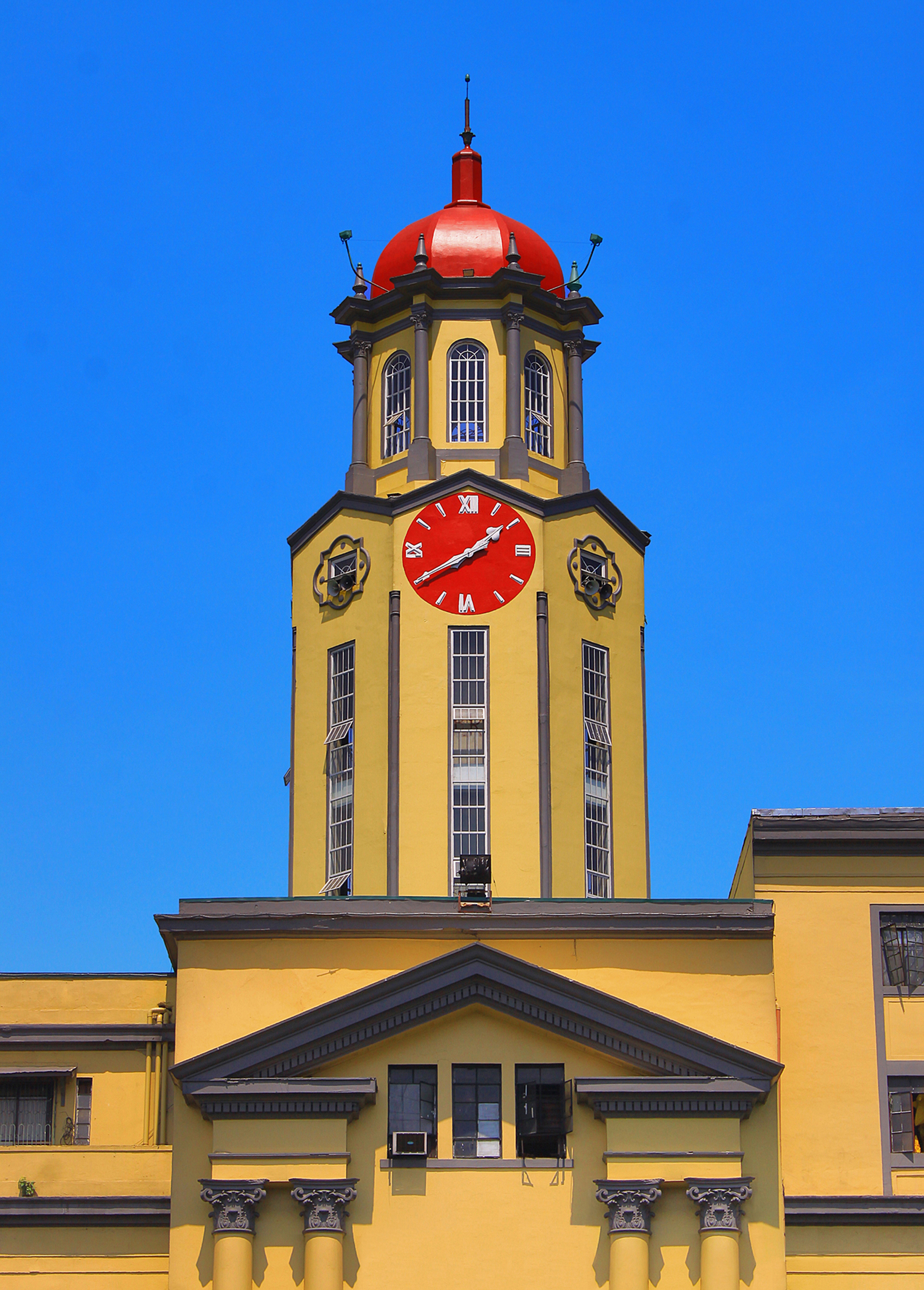
- The Clock tower of Manila City Hall is the icon for synchronizing the time in the whole Philippine archipelago, before an atomic clock was introduced in the country in 2012. The purposes of these Philippine "towering timepieces" are to tell the time and to serve as landmarks.

UTC offset
- PHT: UTC+08:00

Current time
- :: PHT [refresh]

Observance of DST
- DST is not observed in this time zone.

Philippine Standard Time (PST or PhST; Filipino: Pamantayang Oras ng Pilipinas), also known as Philippine Time (PHT), is the official name for the time zone used in the Philippines. The country only uses a single time zone, at an offset of UTC+08:00, but used daylight saving time for brief periods from November 1, 1936 until July 28, 1990.

== Geographic details ==
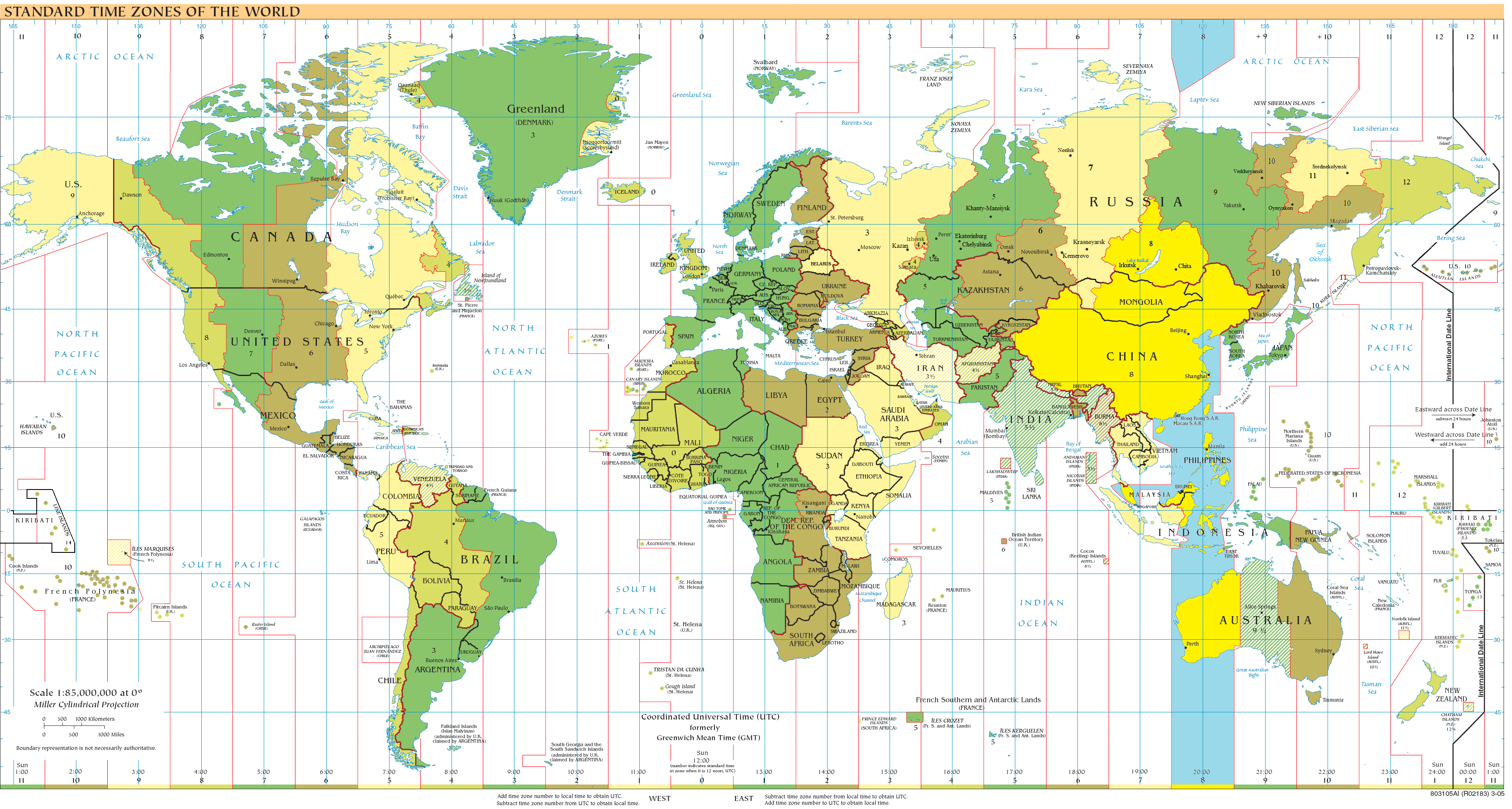
Countries that use UTC+08:00 are in yellow.

Geographically, the Philippines lies within 114°17′/116°53′ and 126°37′ east of the Prime Meridian, and is therefore fully located within the UTC+08:00 time zone. Philippine Standard Time is maintained by the Philippine Atmospheric, Geophysical and Astronomical Services Administration (PAGASA). The Philippines shares the same time zone with China, Taiwan, Hong Kong, Macau, Malaysia, Singapore, Western Australia, Brunei, Irkutsk (Russia), Central Indonesia, and most of Mongolia.

== History ==
=== Precolonial era ===
Before the arrival of Spanish colonizers in the 16th century, communities throughout the Philippine archipelago measured time using natural and astronomical observations, including the positions of the sun, moon, and stars, as well as seasonal changes and agricultural cycles. The portions of the day and night were described using traditional terms, such as bukang-liwayway (dawn), katanghalian (midday), takipsilim (dusk), and hatinggabi (midnight). Timekeeping practices varied among communities, and there was no single nationwide system of standardized clock time equivalent to today's Philippine Standard Time (PST). Although local time could be determined by the sun's position, it would be misleading to describe these communities as formally following a single national time standard.

At that time, the International Date Line (IDL) had not yet been established as an internationally recognized civil convention. Therefore, it would be historically inaccurate to classify the precolonial Philippines as formally belonging to either side of the modern IDL. The country's relationship to the date line must instead be understood in the context of later developments in global navigation, timekeeping, and civil calendar standardization.

=== First circumnavigation ===
The earliest documented European contact and the introduction of the date of the western hemisphere in what is now the Philippines came from the Spanish expedition led by the Portuguese explorer Ferdinand Magellan. When the expedition set sail westward from Seville, Crown of Castile (present-day Spain) on August 10, 1519, Magellan and his crew lost a few minutes each day. Because they were traveling in the same direction as the sun's apparent motion, their days ended slightly later than those of people remaining in Europe, causing each subsequent day to start later as well.

After navigating the strait that would later bear Magellan's name, the expedition sailed into the Pacific Ocean on November 28, 1520, traversing the uncharted waters toward the Spice Islands (present-day Maluku Islands) and crossing the region now associated with the International Date Line (IDL). Because neither standardized time zones nor the IDL existed at the time, it would be anachronistic to suggest the expedition should have adjusted its clocks or advanced its calendar upon crossing this threshold. The resulting calendar discrepancy was simply the natural consequence of a continuous westward journey around the globe.

When the fleet reached the Philippines on Saturday, March 16, 1521 (Julian calendar, which is March 26 on the (proleptic) Gregorian calendar in present use), its calendar date was one day behind Europe and the rest of Asia. According to the firsthand account of Italian chronicler Antonio Pigafetta, the crew first sighted the island of Zamal (present-day Samar) at dawn on the same day and landed on the uninhabited island of Humunu (present-day Homonhon) the next day, Sunday, March 17, 1521, in the Julian calendar—a distinction often conflated in modern retellings. The fleet continued visiting other islands in the archipelago until Magellan was killed at the Battle of Mactan on April 27, 1521.

Because the shipboard log strictly followed continuous European day-counting practices, the surviving crew aboard the Victoria only discovered the calendar anomaly upon reaching Portuguese Cape Verde (present-day Cape Verde) on July 9, 1522, and later Seville on September 8, 1522, finding their meticulously kept records one day behind the local date. Ultimately, the expedition provided one of the earliest empirical demonstrations of the time discrepancy inherent in westward circumnavigation, laying the groundwork for the eventual establishment of the modern IDL.

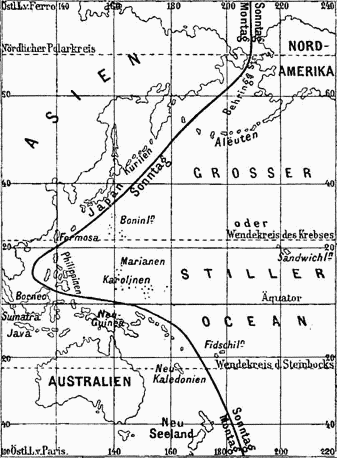
Erroneous International Date Line from the 1888 Meyers Konversations-Lexikon, running between the Spanish Philippine Islands and British Hong Kong. The Philippine Islands along with the rest of New Spain are shown on the eastern side of the IDL. They had moved west of the line in 1845. Bonin Islands and Fiji are also shown east of the line. They were actually west of the line.

=== Spanish colonial period ===
When Miguel López de Legazpi established the first permanent Spanish settlement in Cebu in 1565, the Philippines became part of the Spanish Empire's extensive colonial network across the Pacific Ocean and the Americas. From then until the independence of the Mexican Empire in 1821, the archipelago and the rest of Spanish East Indies, together with Spanish West Indies, were administered through the Viceroyalty of New Spain based in Mexico City. Spanish influence introduced European calendar systems, mechanical clocks, church-bell schedules, and more formal astronomical timekeeping into the Philippines. These developments gradually transformed the ways in which time was measured and communicated, particularly in colonial administrative centers, ports, churches, and settlements.

During Spanish colonial rule (1565–1898), mechanical clocks and church bells became increasingly important in organizing daily life. Church bells were used to announce religious services, prayers, and other communal activities. In many settlements, bells served as audible signals that helped people coordinate their daily schedules. Mechanical clocks were also used in churches, government buildings, commercial establishments, and other institutions. Their use gradually expanded as colonial towns developed. The hours announced by church bells and clocks became important references for urban communities. However, the precision and availability of mechanical timekeeping varied among locations. Local solar observations continued to be useful, particularly in rural communities and areas without reliable mechanical clocks.

For 323 years, 9 months, and 4 days, (Note: Within the Papal Bull of Pope Gregory XIII that mandated the introduction of the Gregorian calendar in 1582. Italy, Portugal, and Spain (including its overseas possessions like the Philippines, and the Americas) skipped 10 days to make the process of a calendrical switch from the Julian to the Gregorian calendar. Thursday, October 4, was followed by Friday, October 15, 1582. Because the Julian calendar acknowledged a leap year day and the Gregorian calendar did not during centennial years (ending with “00”), the Julian calendar fell one day further behind, bringing the difference to 11 days from March 1 (O.S. February 19), 1700 until February 28 (O.S. February 17), 1800, and another one day to 12 days from March 1 (O.S. February 18), 1800 to February 28 (O.S. February 16), 1900; the count of excess days became considered as only 4 instead of 14, to acknowledge the 10 days that the Philippines lose during the period when it was using the date of the western hemisphere.) which lasted from Saturday, March 16, 1521 (Julian Calendar), until Monday, December 30, 1844 (Gregorian Calendar), the Philippines had the same date as Mexico, because it was a Spanish colony supplied and controlled via Mexico through Manila–Acapulco galleon trade, which lasted up to 250 years from June 1, 1565, until September 14, 1815, a few years before Mexico gained independence from Spain on September 27, 1821. After this, the Spanish Crown took direct control of the Philippines and governed directly from Madrid. Additionally, Philippine trade interests turned to Imperial China, the Dutch East Indies and adjacent areas. This gradual reorientation had already begun under the Bourbon Reforms, particularly with the establishment of the Royal Company of the Philippines (Real Compañía de Filipinas) in 1785, following its royal charter two years earlier. Directed by Francisco Cabarrús, the company was intended to strengthen direct trade relations between the Philippines and other parts of the world. Further developments included the termination of the remaining private trans-Pacific trade in 1821, the suppression of the Royal Company's commercial privileges in 1830, and the opening of Philippine ports to world trade in 1834. These reforms progressively expanded the Philippines' commercial connections beyond the traditional Manila–Acapulco trade route and strengthened its economic relations with Asia. Ten years later, the Spanish Governor-General Narciso Clavería consulted the Archbishop of Manila, José Seguí, about fixing the time discrepancy between the Philippines and its Asian neighbors for easier trade and the economic sustenance of the colony. On August 16, 1844, they decreed that the Philippines had to follow the eastern hemisphere by deleting Tuesday, December 31, 1844 from the calendar. Monday, December 30, 1844, was immediately followed by Wednesday, January 1, 1845, which added 1 day or 24 hours to the local time. This meant that the International Date Line moved from going west of the Philippines to go on the east side of the archipelago. At the time, local mean time was used to set clocks, meaning that every place used its own local time based on its longitude because the time was measured by locally observing the Sun.

The establishment of the Manila Observatory in 1865 was a major development in Philippine scientific timekeeping. Founded by the Jesuit mission, the institution initially concentrated on meteorological observations and subsequently expanded into astronomical and geophysical research. Its activities became important for navigation, maritime safety, and scientific observation. In 1879, the observatory began issuing typhoon warnings, while earthquake observations followed in 1880. In 1884, the Spanish government formally recognized the institution as the official Philippine institution for weather forecasting. In 1885, the Manila Observatory began its time service, which greatly benefited merchant shipping and navigation. The institution's astronomical observations and precision instruments contributed to more accurate time determination and the development of scientific timekeeping in the Philippines.

From 1885 to 1898, the Manila Observatory's time service provided accurate time information for maritime users, particularly ships operating in Manila and surrounding waters. The service became an important part of the scientific infrastructure of the colonial capital. Astronomical instruments and chronometers were used to determine and maintain accurate time. These activities supported navigation, maritime commerce, and the increasingly important role of Manila as an international port. The observatory's timekeeping activities also laid the groundwork for the later adoption of a nationwide standard time under American administration.

=== American colonial period ===
After the transfer of sovereignty from Spain to the United States in 1898, the Philippines began moving toward modern standardized time offsets rather than individual local solar times. In the following year, the archipelago first adopted a standard time based on the 120 degrees east longitude, equivalent to eight hours ahead of GMT (UTC had not been established yet). May 11, 1899 is associated with the American military government's standard-time order, while September 6, 1899 is the documented date of the Manila Observatory's operational time-signal adjustment. Act No. 131 established the Philippine Weather Bureau on May 22, 1901, assigning it responsibilities relating to the provision of standard time. Telegraphic signals helped distribute accurate time from Manila to connected stations. In 1917, wireless time signals transmitted from Cavite provided another means of disseminating standard time throughout the archipelago. On October 26, 1936, Commonwealth Act No. 91 formally fixed Philippine Standard Time on the basis of mean astronomical time at 120 degrees east longitude and authorized the President to establish daylight saving time through proclamations.

During World War II, particularly under Japanese occupation (1942–1945), the Philippines was nine hours ahead of GMT and operating on Japan Standard Time (JST). To bring this about, the clocks were not put back by an hour (Philippine Daylight Saving Time having started early, on December 16, 1941 under Proclamation No. 789, signed by President Manuel L. Quezon). Following the liberation of the Philippines and restoration of the Commonwealth government, the territory continued observing the one-hour-advanced time as a wartime arrangement (to Philippine Daylight Saving Time). On November 11, 1945, President Sergio Osmeña issued Proclamation No. 20, terminating daylight saving time; the clocks were put back by an hour at the end of November 30, 1945, so the Philippines reverted to standard time.

=== Postwar and contemporary period ===
Following World War II and Philippine independence, the country continued using GMT+08:00. The postwar period saw the modernization of official timekeeping through electronic clocks, GPS-based systems, atomic clocks, and nationwide synchronization. The Time Service Division was established in the Philippine Weather Bureau in 1949. In 1951, a Synchrome ensemble replaced the marine chronometer, while a quartz clock was introduced in 1965 to improve timekeeping accuracy. Presidential Decree No. 1149, issued in 1977, designated PAGASA as the official time-service agency of the Philippines.

Philippine Standard Time was instituted through Batas Pambansa Blg. 8 (that defined the metric system), approved on December 2, 1978, and implemented on January 1, 1983. The Philippines is one of the few countries to officially and almost exclusively use the 12-hour clock in non-military situations. (Note: Aside from the 12-hour clock, the Philippines also uses the 24-hour clock format, which some Filipinos prefer for personal use. Smartwatches sold in the country are typically programmed to display the 24-hour format by default. Likewise, smartphones, laptops, and personal computers can be set to either the 12-hour or 24-hour format, depending on the user’s preference. However, despite the availability and use of the 24-hour format on devices, Filipinos generally continue to pronounce and express time using the 12-hour format in everyday conversation.)

In 1997, PAGASA installed a GPS-based timing system. A rubidium/GPS time-transfer system was acquired in 2003, followed by a modern Precise Time-Scale System consisting of three high-performance caesium atomic clocks in 2015.

In September 2011, the Department of Science and Technology proposed to synchronize time nationwide, which was an effort to discourage tardiness and non-standard time displayed on television and radio stations. PAGASA installed a rubidium atomic clock, a GPS receiver, a time interval counter, a distribution amplifier, and a computer to help calculate the time difference with every satellite within its antenna's field of view.

In order to promote synchronicity with official time, on May 15, 2013, President Benigno Aquino III signed Republic Act No. 10535 setting the Philippine Standard Time, requiring all government offices and media networks to synchronize their timepieces with PAGASA's rubidium atomic clock. It also designates the first week of every year as National Time Consciousness Week to promote punctuality and awareness of accurate timekeeping.

=== Timeline ===
Period in use	Time offset from GMT/UTC (Note: The official abbreviation UTC was formally adopted in 1967 by the International Astronomical Union to create a unified global time standard. While international coordination first began on January 1, 1960, the modern version of UTC used today was officially implemented worldwide on January 1, 1972, introducing leap seconds and successfully replacing Greenwich Mean Time (GMT) for civil use.)	Name of time
Saturday, March 16, 1521 (Julian Calendar) – Monday, December 30, 1844 (Gregorian Calendar)	GMT−15:56 (in Manila)	Local mean time
Saturday, March 16, 1521 (Julian Calendar) – Monday, December 30, 1844 (Gregorian Calendar)	GMT−16:12 (in Balabac, the westernmost island)	Local mean time
Saturday, March 16, 1521 (Julian Calendar) – Monday, December 30, 1844 (Gregorian Calendar)	GMT−15:34 (in Davao Oriental, the easternmost area)	Local mean time
~~Tuesday, December 31, 1844~~	The day that never occurred as ordered by the Spanish Governor-General Narciso Claveria to add 24 hours to the local mean time.	Time zone change (Note: The change also applied to Caroline Islands, Guam, Marianas Islands, Marshall Islands and Palau for being part of the Captaincy General of the Philippines during that time.)
Wednesday, January 1, 1845 – September 5, 1899	GMT+08:04 (in Manila)	Local mean time
Wednesday, January 1, 1845 – September 5, 1899	GMT+07:48 (in Balabac, the westernmost island)	Local mean time
Wednesday, January 1, 1845 – September 5, 1899	GMT+08:26 (in Davao Oriental, the easternmost area)	Local mean time
September 6, 1899 – October 31, 1936	GMT+08:00	Philippine Standard Time (Note: The adoption of Standard Time in the Philippines took place through two distinguishable stages in 1899. On May 11, the United States War Department issued Circular No. 17, administratively establishing the time of the 120th meridian east of Greenwich (GMT+08:00) for the Philippine Archipelago and other territories under American military government. The circular was subsequently republished in Manila on July 13, 1899, as Circular No. 8 of the Office of the U.S. Military Governor. On September 6, 1899, the Manila Observatory implemented the new standard in its official time service, dropping its time ball at noon according to the new standard time for the first time. This replaced Manila's previous local mean time of approximately GMT+08:03:52 with GMT+08:00.)
November 1, 1936 – January 15, 1937	GMT+09:00	Philippine Daylight Saving Time
January 16, 1937 – December 15, 1941	GMT+08:00	Philippine Standard Time
December 16, 1941 – February 11, 1942	GMT+09:00	Philippine Daylight Saving Time
February 12, 1942 – March 3, 1945	GMT+09:00	Tokyo Standard Time
March 4, 1945 – November 30, 1945	GMT+09:00	Philippine Daylight Saving Time
December 1, 1945 – April 11, 1954	GMT+08:00	Philippine Standard Time
April 12, 1954 – June 4, 1954	GMT+09:00	Philippine Daylight Saving Time
June 5, 1954 – March 27, 1977	GMT/UTC+08:00	Philippine Standard Time
March 28, 1977 – September 21, 1977	UTC+09:00	Philippine Daylight Saving Time
September 22, 1977 – May 20, 1990	UTC+08:00	Philippine Standard Time
May 21, 1990 – July 28, 1990	UTC+09:00	Philippine Daylight Saving Time
July 29, 1990 – present	UTC+08:00	Philippine Standard Time

== Use of daylight saving time ==
Since 1991, the Philippines has not observed daylight saving time. It was in use for short periods (and even long periods during wartime) during the presidencies of Manuel L. Quezon in 1936–1937 and 1941–1944, Sergio Osmeña in 1943–1945, Ramon Magsaysay in 1954, Ferdinand Marcos in 1977, and Corazon Aquino in 1990.

== IANA time zone database ==
The IANA time zone database contains one zone for the Philippines in the file zone.tab, named Asia/Manila

== Date and time format ==
=== Date ===
Standard: August 18, 2023 (month day, year or mm/dd/yyyy)
Formal (public documents): the 18th day of August, 2023 or 18 August 2023 (day month year)
Filipino: ika-18 ng Agosto, 2023 or 18 Agosto 2023 (dd-mm-yyyy)
Passport: 18 08 2023 (dd mm yyyy)

=== Time ===
Standard: 12-hour clock
Military/Scouting: US Military Time
Public Transport and Marathon events: 24-hour clock
Common spoken language

Tagalized Spanish terminology (original Spanish spelling in parentheses; am radio stations and everyday conversation)

8:41 – Alas otso kuwarenta y uno (A las ocho cuarenta y uno)
5:30 – Alas singko y medya (A las cinco y media)
3:00 – Alas tres (A las tres; en punto, literally meaning "on the dot", may be added to signify "o'Clock".)

English (Business, Legal and others)

8:41 pm – Eight forty-one pm
5:30 am – Five Thirty am
3:00 pm – Three O'Clock or Three pm
12:00 pm – Twelve Midday or Twelve Noon – Twelve pm is seldom used as it might be confused with 12 Midnight
12:00 am – Twelve Midnight – Twelve am is seldom used as it might be confused with 12 Noon

Tagalog and Filipino
Starts with Spanish-derived (original spelling in parentheses) and ends with Tagalog – Umaga starts at 5:00 am and ends 11:59 am. Tanghalì is noon. Hapon starts at 1:00 pm and ends 5:59 pm. Gabí starts at 6:00 pm and ends 12:00 am which is Hatinggabi. Madalíng Araw starts at 12:01 am and ends 4:59 am. Except in very formal situations, Filipinos rarely use the vernacular numbers in telling time.

8:41 P.M. – Alas otso kuwarenta y uno (A las ocho cuarenta y uno) ng gabí or Apatnapú't-isá(ng minuto) makalipas ng ikawaló ng gabí or (ika)waló at apatnapú't-isá (na) ng gabi
5:30 A.M. – Alas singko y medya (A las cinco y media) ng umaga or Tatlumpû(ng minuto) makalipas ng ikalimá ng umaga or Kalahati makalipas ng ikalimá ng umaga or (ika)limá at kalaháti ng umaga or (ika)limá at tatlumpû(ng minuto) (na) ng umaga
3:00 P.M. – Alas tres (A las tres) ng hapon o Ikatló ng hapon
12:00 P.M. – Alas dose (A las doce) ng tanghalì o Ikalabíndalawá ng tanghalì
12:00 A.M. – Alas dose (A las doce) ng hatinggabi o Ikalabíndalawá ng hatinggabí
2:00 A.M. – Alas dos ng madalíng araw (A las dos) o Ikalawá ng madalíng araw

== See also ==
- ASEAN Common Time
- Equation of time
- International Atomic Time
- International Date Line
- Railway time
- Terrestrial Time
- Time zone (list)
- UTC+08:00
- Zoneinfo
