= 64th meridian west =

Line of longitude

64th meridian west

The meridian 64° west of Greenwich is a line of longitude that extends from the North Pole across the Arctic Ocean, North America, the Atlantic Ocean, South America, the Southern Ocean, and Antarctica to the South Pole.

The 64th meridian west forms a great circle with the 116th meridian east.

== From Pole to Pole ==
Starting at the North Pole and heading south to the South Pole, the 64th meridian west passes through:

Co-ordinates	Country, territory or sea	Notes
90°0′N 64°0′W	Arctic Ocean	
83°20′N 64°0′W	Lincoln Sea	
82°50′N 64°0′W	Canada	Nunavut — Ellesmere Island
81°47′N 64°0′W	Nares Strait	
81°2′N 64°0′W	Greenland	Daugaard-Jensen Land
76°6′N 64°0′W	Baffin Bay	
70°0′N 64°0′W	Davis Strait	
67°34′N 64°0′W	Canada	Nunavut — Qikiqtarjuaq Island and Baffin Island
65°2′N 64°0′W	Davis Strait	
63°41′N 64°0′W	Canada	Nunavut — Lemieux Islands
63°34′N 64°0′W	Davis Strait	
60°0′N 64°0′W	Atlantic Ocean	Labrador Sea
59°46′N 64°0′W	Canada	Newfoundland and Labrador — Labrador; Quebec — from 58°50′N 64°0′W; Newfoundland and Labrador — Labrador, from 58°41′N 64°0′W; Quebec — from 58°31′N 63°0′W; Newfoundland and Labrador — Labrador, from 58°26′N 64°0′W; Quebec — from 57°49′N 63°0′W; Newfoundland and Labrador — Labrador, from 56°52′N 64°0′W; Quebec — from 56°35′N 63°0′W; Newfoundland and Labrador — Labrador, from 56°25′N 64°0′W; Quebec — from 56°16′N 63°0′W; Newfoundland and Labrador — Labrador, from 56°10′N 64°0′W; Quebec — from 56°4′N 63°0′W; Newfoundland and Labrador — Labrador, from 34°36′N 64°0′W; Quebec — from 52°44′N 63°0′W; Newfoundland and Labrador — Labrador, from 52°34′N 64°0′W; Quebec — from 52°22′N 63°0′W
50°16′N 64°0′W	Gulf of Saint Lawrence	Jacques Cartier Strait
49°55′N 64°0′W	Canada	Quebec — Anticosti Island
49°42′N 64°0′W	Gulf of Saint Lawrence	
47°3′N 64°0′W	Canada	Prince Edward Island
46°23′N 64°0′W	Gulf of Saint Lawrence	Northumberland Strait
46°11′N 64°0′W	Canada	New Brunswick; Nova Scotia — from 46°0′N 63°0′W
44°39′N 64°0′W	Atlantic Ocean	
18°30′N 64°0′W	Caribbean Sea	Passing just west of Isla Aves — claimed by Dominica and Venezuela (at 15°43′N 63°48′W)
11°4′N 64°0′W	Venezuela	Isla Margarita and mainland
3°53′N 64°0′W	Brazil	Roraima
2°29′N 64°0′W	Venezuela	
1°58′N 64°0′W	Brazil	Amazonas; Rondônia — from 8°41′S 63°0′W
12°32′S 64°0′W	Bolivia	
22°9′S 64°0′W	Argentina	
41°4′S 64°0′W	Atlantic Ocean	San Matías Gulf
42°8′S 64°0′W	Argentina	Valdes Peninsula
42°52′S 64°0′W	Atlantic Ocean	
54°43′S 64°0′W	Argentina	Isla de los Estados
54°46′S 64°0′W	Atlantic Ocean	
60°0′S 64°0′W	Southern Ocean	
64°31′S 64°0′W	Antarctica	Anvers Island — claimed by Argentina, Chile and United Kingdom
64°45′S 64°0′W	Southern Ocean	
65°4′S 64°0′W	Antarctica	Claimed by Argentina, Chile and United Kingdom

== See also ==
- 63rd meridian west
- 65th meridian west
