= Bessel Fjord, NW Greenland =

Fjord in Greenland

Bessel Fjord
- Bessels Fjord
- Location
- Location: Arctic
- Coordinates: 80°55′N 63°5′W
- Ocean/sea sources: Kennedy Channel; Nares Strait
- Basin countries: Greenland
- Max. length: 45 km (28 mi)
- Max. width: 3.5 km (2.2 mi)
- Frozen: Most of the year
- Settlements: Uninhabited

Bessel Fjord (Danish: Bessels Fjord) is a fjord in northwestern Greenland. Administratively it belongs to the Avannaata municipality.

Knud Rasmussen described the fjord entrance in the following terms:

We passed Bessel Fjord in a fresh breeze, and the peculiar indentation, surrounded on all sides by steep mountains intersected by hanging tongues of ice, looked eerie and desolate.

== Geography ==
Bessel Fjord stretches roughly from north to south for about 60 km. It is a long and narrow fjord lined with high mountains rising steeply from the shore. Hannah Island, a small island, lies in the area of its mouth by the Kennedy Channel, Cape Bryan is on the western side of the mouth and Cape Maynard on the northeastern.

This fjord is located northeast of Washington Land, at the northern end of Daugaard-Jensen Land. The Petermann Peninsula forms its eastern shore. There are large ice caps on both landmasses flanking the fjord.

Map of part of Ellesmere Island and far Northern Greenland.

== Bibliography ==
- H.P. Trettin (ed.), Geology of the Innuitian Orogen and Arctic Platform of Canada and Greenland. Geological Survey of Canada (1991) ISBN 978-0660131313

== See also ==
- List of fjords of Greenland
