= 64th meridian =

64th meridian may refer to:

- 64th meridian east, a line of longitude east of the Greenwich Meridian
- 64th meridian west, a line of longitude west of the Greenwich Meridian

64th meridian west	64th meridian east
