= 118th meridian =

118th meridian may refer to:

- 118th meridian east, a line of longitude east of the Greenwich Meridian
- 118th meridian west, a line of longitude west of the Greenwich Meridian

| 118th meridian west | 118th meridian east |
