= 60th meridian west =

Line of longitude

60th meridian west

The meridian 60° west of Greenwich is a line of longitude that extends from the North Pole across the Arctic Ocean, Greenland, North America, the Atlantic Ocean, South America, the Southern Ocean, and Antarctica to the South Pole.

The mean solar time of this meridian is the base for the Atlantic Time Zone (UTC-4 during standard time).

The 60th meridian west forms a great circle with the 120th meridian east.

== From Pole to Pole ==
Starting at the North Pole and heading south to the South Pole, the 60th meridian west passes through:

Co-ordinates	Country, territory or sea	Notes
90°0′N 60°0′W	Arctic Ocean	
83°28′N 60°0′W	Lincoln Sea	
81°56′N 60°0′W	Greenland	Hall Land
75°56′N 60°0′W	Baffin Bay	
70°0′N 60°0′W	Davis Strait	
60°0′N 60°0′W	Atlantic Ocean	Labrador Sea
55°24′N 60°0′W	Canada	Newfoundland and Labrador — Labrador; Quebec — from 52°0′N 60°0′W
50°14′N 60°0′W	Gulf of Saint Lawrence	Passing just east of St. Paul Island, Nova Scotia, Canada (at 47°13′N 60°8′W)
47°14′N 60°0′W	Cabot Strait	
46°13′N 60°0′W	Canada	Nova Scotia — Cape Breton Island
45°53′N 60°0′W	Atlantic Ocean	
43°57′N 60°0′W	Canada	Nova Scotia — Sable Island
43°56′N 60°0′W	Atlantic Ocean	
8°33′N 60°0′W	Venezuela	
8°6′N 60°0′W	Guyana	Territory claimed by Venezuela
5°5′N 60°0′W	Brazil	Roraima — for about 18 km
4°55′N 60°0′W	Guyana	Territory claimed by Venezuela
4°30′N 60°0′W	Brazil	Roraima; Amazonas — from 0°14′N 60°0′W, passing just east of Manaus at 3°6′S 60°1′W; Mato Grosso — from 8°46′S 60°0′W; Rondônia — from 11°8′S 60°0′W; Mato Grosso — from 11°28′S 60°0′W; Rondônia — from 11°50′S 60°0′W; Mato Grosso — from 12°41′S 60°0′W
16°16′S 60°0′W	Bolivia	
19°18′S 60°0′W	Paraguay	
24°2′S 60°0′W	Argentina	
38°51′S 60°0′W	Atlantic Ocean	
51°18′S 60°0′W	Falkland Islands	Islands of Keppel and West Falkland — claimed by Argentina
52°0′S 60°0′W	Atlantic Ocean	
60°0′S 60°0′W	Southern Ocean	
62°27′S 60°0′W	South Shetland Islands	Greenwich Island and Livingston Island — claimed by Argentina, Chile and United Kingdom
62°40′S 60°0′W	Southern Ocean	
63°51′S 60°0′W	Antarctica	Antarctic Peninsula — claimed by Argentina, Chile and United Kingdom
65°50′S 60°0′W	Southern Ocean	Weddell Sea
68°5′S 60°0′W	Antarctica	Territory claimed by Argentina, Chile and United Kingdom
69°1′S 60°0′W	Southern Ocean	Weddell Sea
72°49′S 60°0′W	Antarctica	Territory claimed by Argentina, Chile and United Kingdom
73°17′S 60°0′W	Southern Ocean	Weddell Sea
75°19′S 60°0′W	Antarctica	Territory claimed by Argentina, Chile and United Kingdom

== See also ==
- 59th meridian west
- 61st meridian west
