= 120th meridian =

120th meridian may refer to:

- 120th meridian east, a line of longitude east of the Greenwich Meridian
- 120th meridian west, a line of longitude west of the Greenwich Meridian

120th meridian west	120th meridian east
