= Kayser Mountain =

Mountain in Greenland

- Kayser Bjerg
- Location within Greenland

Highest point
- Elevation: 1,094 m (3,589 ft)
- Coordinates: 81°33′15″N 58°58′28″W

Geography
- Location: Hall Land, Greenland
- Parent range: Haug Range

Climbing
- First ascent: Unknown

Kayser Mountain (Danish: Kayser Bjerg) is a mountain in Hall Land, NW Greenland. Administratively it is part of the Northeast Greenland National Park. This peak was named after German geologist and paleontologist Emanuel Kayser.

== Geography ==
Kayser Mountain is located at the eastern end of the Haug Range in northern Hall Land, at the southern limit of the Polaris Foreland. It rises 6 km to the southwest of the shore of the Newman Bay fjord. With a height of 1,094 metres (3,589 ft), Kayser Mountain is the highest elevation of Hall Land and of the Haug Range.

Brachiopod fossils of genus Pentamerus dating back to the Lower Silurian have been found in this mountain.

Map of the Nares Strait area.

== See also ==
- List of mountains in Greenland
- Peary Land Group

== Bibliography ==
- Greenland geology and selected mineral occurrences - GEUS
