= 117th meridian =

117th meridian may refer to:

- 117th meridian east, a line of longitude east of the Greenwich Meridian
- 117th meridian west, a line of longitude west of the Greenwich Meridian

117th meridian west	117th meridian east
