= 116th meridian =

116th meridian may refer to:

- 116th meridian east, a line of longitude east of the Greenwich Meridian
- 116th meridian west, a line of longitude west of the Greenwich Meridian

116th meridian west	116th meridian east
