= 119th meridian =

119th meridian may refer to:

- 119th meridian east, a line of longitude east of the Greenwich Meridian
- 119th meridian west, a line of longitude west of the Greenwich Meridian

119th meridian west	119th meridian east
