= 61st meridian west =

Line of longitude

61st meridian west (interactive map)

The meridian 61° west of Greenwich is a line of longitude that extends from the North Pole across the Arctic Ocean, Greenland, North America, the Atlantic Ocean, South America, the Southern Ocean, and Antarctica to the South Pole.

The 61st meridian west forms a great circle with the 119th meridian east.

== From Pole to Pole ==
Starting at the North Pole and heading south to the South Pole, the 61st meridian west passes through:

| Co-ordinates | Country, territory or sea | Notes |
|---|---|---|
| 90°0′N 61°0′W | Arctic Ocean | Passing just east of Ellesmere Island, Nunavut, Canada (at 82°21′N 61°7′W) |
| 83°26′N 61°0′W | Lincoln Sea | |
| 81°50′N 61°0′W | Greenland | Hall Land |
| 76°3′N 61°0′W | Baffin Bay | |
| 70°0′N 61°0′W | Davis Strait | Passing just east of Baffin Island, Nunavut, Canada (at 66°37′N 61°15′W) |
| 60°0′N 61°0′W | Atlantic Ocean | Labrador Sea |
| 56°7′N 61°0′W | Canada | Newfoundland and Labrador — Labrador; Quebec — from 52°0′N 61°0′W |
| 50°12′N 61°0′W | Gulf of Saint Lawrence | |
| 46°39′N 61°0′W | Canada | Nova Scotia — Cape Breton Island and Isle Madame |
| 45°30′N 61°0′W | Chedabucto Bay | |
| 45°20′N 61°0′W | Canada | Nova Scotia |
| 45°16′N 61°0′W | Atlantic Ocean | Passing just east of the island of La Désirade, Guadeloupe, France (at 16°20′N 61°0′W); Passing just east of the island of Marie-Galante, Guadeloupe, France (at 15°56′N 61°11′W); Passing just east of the island of Dominica (at 15°19′N 61°15′W) |
| 14°48′N 61°0′W | France | Martinique |
| 14°28′N 61°0′W | Atlantic Ocean | Saint Lucia Channel |
| 14°1′N 61°0′W | Saint Lucia | |
| 13°45′N 61°0′W | Atlantic Ocean | Passing just east of the island of St Vincent, Saint Vincent and the Grenadines (at 13°17′N 61°7′W); Passing just east of the island of Baliceaux, Saint Vincent and the Grenadines (at 12°57′N 61°7′W); Passing just east of the island of Mustique, Saint Vincent and the Grenadines (at 12°53′N 61°10′W) |
| 10°50′N 61°0′W | Trinidad and Tobago | Island of Trinidad |
| 10°42′N 61°0′W | Atlantic Ocean | |
| 10°21′N 61°0′W | Trinidad and Tobago | Island of Trinidad |
| 10°8′N 61°0′W | Atlantic Ocean | |
| 9°33′N 61°0′W | Venezuela | |
| 6°44′N 61°0′W | Guyana | Territory claimed by Venezuela |
| 5°31′N 61°0′W | Venezuela | |
| 4°31′N 61°0′W | Brazil | Roraima; Amazonas — from 0°33′S 61°0′W; Mato Grosso — from 8°46′S 61°0′W; Rondônia — from 10°59′S 61°0′W |
| 13°32′S 61°0′W | Bolivia | |
| 19°31′S 61°0′W | Paraguay | |
| 23°47′S 61°0′W | Argentina | |
| 38°59′S 61°0′W | Atlantic Ocean | |
| 51°47′S 61°0′W | Falkland Islands | Weddell Island and West Falkland — claimed by Argentina |
| 52°4′S 61°0′W | Atlantic Ocean | |
| 60°0′S 61°0′W | Southern Ocean | |
| 62°37′S 61°0′W | South Shetland Islands | Livingston Island — claimed by Argentina, Chile and United Kingdom |
| 62°40′S 61°0′W | Southern Ocean | Passing just west of Trinity Island |
| 64°3′S 61°0′W | Antarctica | Antarctic Peninsula — claimed by Argentina, Chile and United Kingdom |
| 74°31′S 61°0′W | Southern Ocean | Weddell Sea |
| 75°8′S 61°0′W | Antarctica | Territory claimed by Argentina, Chile and United Kingdom |

== See also ==
- 60th meridian west
- 62nd meridian west
