= Hannah Island =

Hannah Island may refer to:

- Hannah Island (Greenland), an island in Greenland
- Hannah Island (Antarctica), an island in Marie Byrd Land
