= Nina Bang Mountain =

Mountain in Greenland

- Nina Bang Bjerg
- Location within Greenland

Highest point
- Elevation: 815 m (2,674 ft)
- Coordinates: 81°38′22″N 57°38′58″W

Geography
- Location: Nyeboe Land, Greenland

Climbing
- First ascent: Unknown

Nina Bang Mountain (Danish: Nina Bang Bjerg) is a mountain in NW Greenland. Administratively it is part of Avannaata municipality. This peak was named after Denmark's first woman cabinet minister Nina Bang.

== Geography ==
Nina Bang Mountain is located in southwestern Nyeboe Land. It rises roughly 12 km to the east of the shore of Newman Bay fjord and reaches a height of 815 metres (2,674 ft).

Map of the Nares Strait area.

== See also ==
- List of mountains in Greenland

== Bibliography ==
- Greenland geology and selected mineral occurrences - GEUS
