= Haug Range =

Mountain range in Greenland

- Hauge Bjerge
- Map of the Nares Strait area.

Highest point
- Peak: Kayser Mountain
- Elevation: 1,094 m (3,589 ft)

Dimensions
- Length: 60 km (37 mi) E/W
- Width: 10 km (6.2 mi) N/S

Geography
- Location within Greenland
- Country: Greenland
- Range coordinates: 81°30′N 59°35′W

Geology
- Rock age: Lower Silurian

The Haug Range (Danish: Hauge Bjerge) is a mountain range in far northwestern Greenland. Administratively this range is part of Avannaata municipality. The range is located in Hall Land, one of the coldest places in Greenland.

This mountain chain was named after Ivar Haug, who compiled the first Gazetteer of Greenland. The area of the range is characterized by Tundra climate.

== Geography ==
The Haug Range is an up to almost 1,100 m high little glaciated mountain range in Hall Land. It runs roughly from east to west across the peninsula, from the shores of the Nares Strait to the shores of the Newman Bay, separating the unglaciated Polaris Foreland in the north from the southern part of Hall Land. 1,094 metres (3,589 ft) high Kayser Mountain, the highest elevation of the range, is located at its northeastern end. The area of the Haug Range is uninhabited.

Pentamerus fossils dating back to the Lower Silurian have been found in this mountain range. They belong to the Hauge Bjerge Formation.

== See also ==
- List of mountain ranges of Greenland
- Peary Land Group

== Bibliography ==
- Greenland geology and selected mineral occurrences - GEUS
