= Petermann Fjord =

Fjord in Greenland

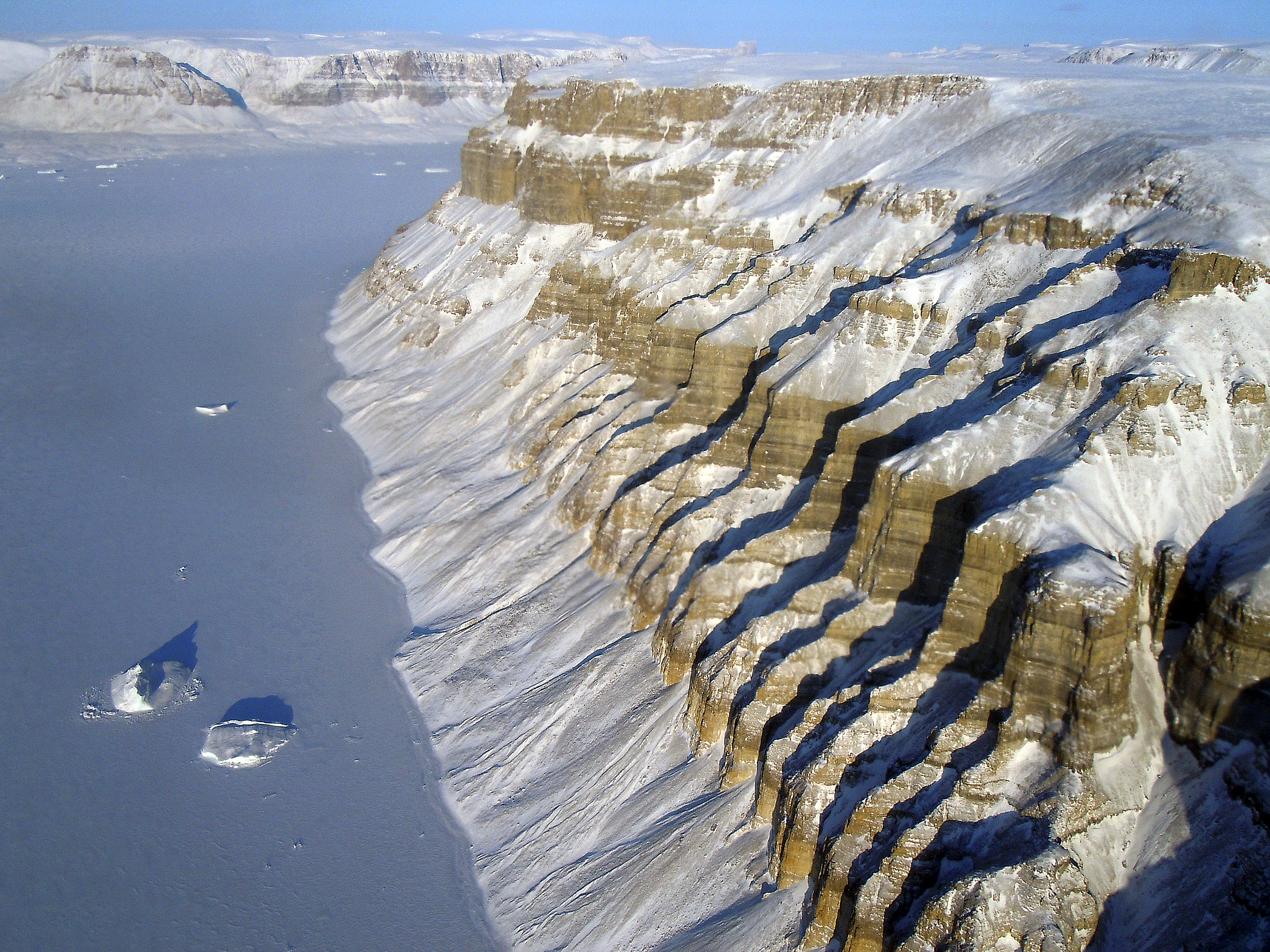
- Shoreline cliffs flanking the fjord.

- Location
- Location: Arctic
- Coordinates: 81°10′N 61°30′W
- River sources: Petermann Glacier
- Ocean/sea sources: Hall Basin; Nares Strait
- Basin countries: Greenland
- Max. length: 110 km (68 mi)
- Max. width: 17 km (11 mi)
- Frozen: Most of the year
- Settlements: Uninhabited

Petermann Fjord is a fjord in northwestern Greenland. Administratively it marks the boundary between the Avannaata municipality and the Northeast Greenland National Park.

The fjord and its glacier are named after German cartographer August Heinrich Petermann.

Knud Rasmussen described the fjord entrance in the following terms:

This fjord looked quaint and foreign in its surroundings. Everywhere the mountains along the coast fall steeply down towards the ice, and the dark-brownish tones showed gloomy and serious against the even, white inland-ice which appears everywhere as a bank of white fog behind the coastland. In several places along the fjord, tongues of the glacier shoot down between the mountains, but at no point here is the production of ice-mountains apparent.

== Geography ==
Petermann Fjord stretches roughly from southeast to northwest for about 110 km. Its mouth opens in the Kennedy Channel and Hall Basin area, between Cape Lucie Marie, located east of Cape Morton, and Cape Tyson in the north, near Offley Island. It is a long and broad fjord lined with precipitous cliffs topped by glaciated plateaux. The Petermann Glacier, the longest glacier in Greenland, discharges into the fjord from the Greenland Ice Sheet, located further 80 km inland.

This fjord is located northeast of Daugaard-Jensen Land, between the Petermann Peninsula and Hall Land.

Map of part of Ellesmere Island and far Northern Greenland.

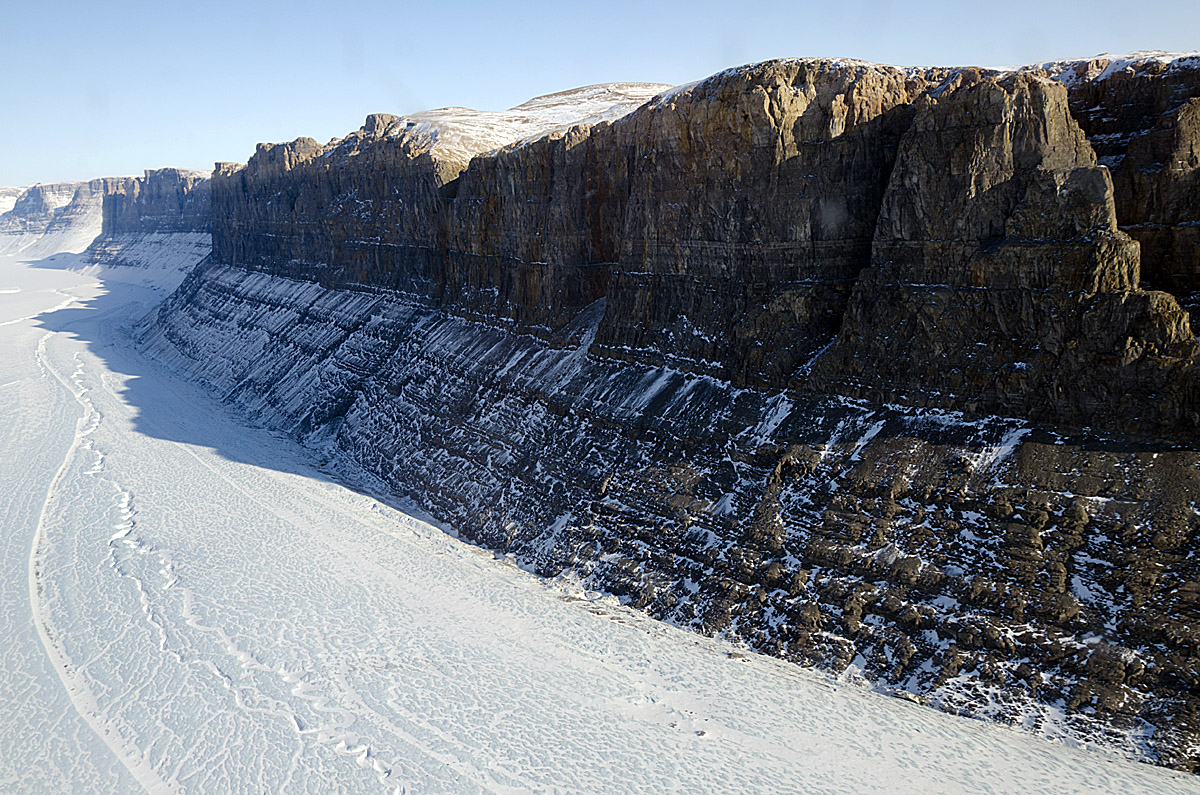
View of the cliffs flanking Petermann Fjord marking the western limits of Hall Land.

== Bibliography ==
- H.P. Trettin (ed.), Geology of the Innuitian Orogen and Arctic Platform of Canada and Greenland. Geological Survey of Canada (1991) ISBN 978-0660131313
- Ocean circulation and properties in Petermann Fjord, Greenland
- Multibeam bathymetry from the Petermann Fjord and adjacent Hall Basin, Northwest Greenland

== See also ==
- List of fjords of Greenland
