= Cape Morton =

Headland in northern Greenland

Cape Morton Kap Morton
- Cape
- Map of the Nares Strait area.

- Location in Greenland
- Coordinates: 81°12′N 62°48′W
- Location: Avannaata, Greenland
- Offshore water bodies: Nares Strait
- Elevation: 600

Cape Morton (Danish: Kap Morton) is a headland in North Greenland in Avannaata municipality. The cape is named after Arctic explorer William Morton, who surveyed the Nares Strait area together with Hans Hendrik in June 1854 during the Second Grinnell Expedition.

Fossils dating back to the Homerian have been found in the area of the cape. They belong to the Kap Morton Formation of the Peary Land Group.

== Geography ==
Cape Morton is located west of Cape Lucie Marie, off the mouth of the Petermann Fjord opposite Cape Tyson at the northern end of the Petermann Peninsula. Mushroom-shaped Joe Island lies 3.2 km from the shore west-north-west of the cape.

Together with Cape Baird on the eastern coast of Ellesmere Island this cape marks the northern limit of the Kennedy Channel and the entrance of the Hall Basin, both part of the Nares Strait.

== See also ==
- List of fossiliferous stratigraphic units in Greenland
- Peary Land
