= Wilhelm Dames =

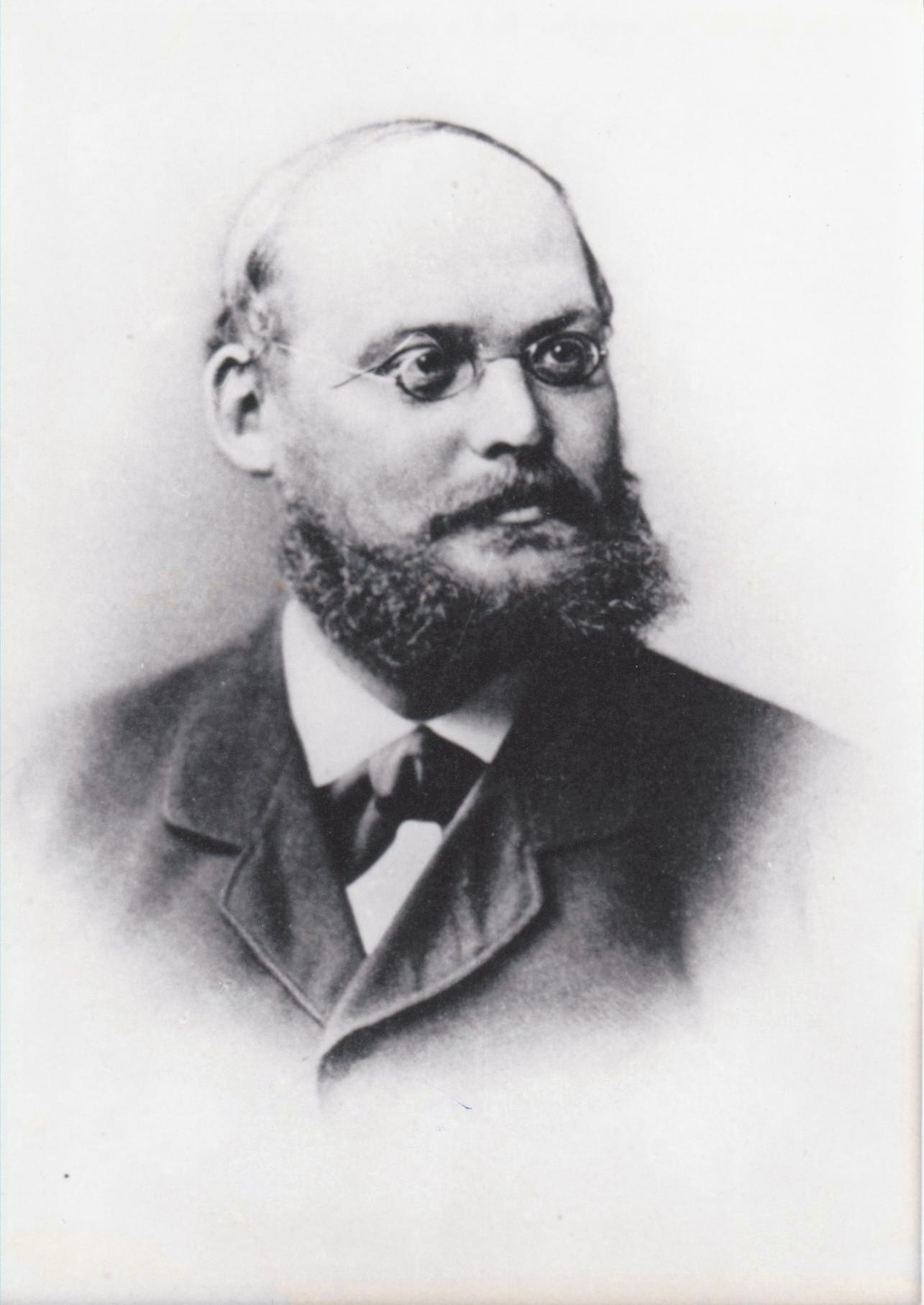
Prof. Wilhelm Dames

Wilhelm Barnim Dames (9 June 1843, in Stolp – 22 December 1898, in Berlin) was a German paleontologist of the Berlin University, who described the first complete specimen of the early bird Archaeopteryx in 1894. This specimen is currently in the Museum für Naturkunde.

He studied at the universities of Berlin and Breslau, where he was a student of Ferdinand von Roemer. In 1874 he obtained his habilitation, and in 1891 succeeded Heinrich Ernst Beyrich as a full professor of geology and paleontology at the University of Berlin. With Emanuel Kayser, he was co-editor of the journal Paläontologische Abhandlungen.

Dames was also the first to describe an Archaeoceti fossil from Egypt in 1883. In 1894 he published Über Zeuglodonten aus Ägypten und die Beziehungen der Archaeoceten zu den übrigen Cetaceen ("On Zeuglodontes from Egypt and the relationship of Archaeoceti to the other cetaceans").

A Devonian brachiopod coming from an outcrop in Lower Silesia Dames had studied was named in his honour Kyrtatrypa barnimi.
