= Lewis Beaumont =

Royal Navy Admiral (1847–1922)

Admiral Sir Lewis Beaumont GCB KCMG
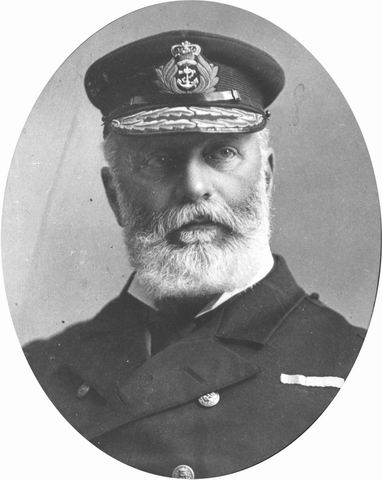
- Born: 19 May 1847; Paris, France
- Died: 20 June 1922 (aged 75); Cuckfield, Sussex, England
- Military career
- Allegiance: United Kingdom
- Branch: Royal Navy
- Rank: Admiral
- Commands: Pacific Station; Australia Station; Plymouth Command
- Awards: Knight Grand Cross of the Order of the Bath; Knight Commander of the Order of St Michael and St George

Admiral Sir Lewis Anthony Beaumont, GCB, KCMG (19 May 1847 – 20 June 1922) was a Royal Navy officer who served as Commander-in-Chief, Plymouth.

== Naval career ==
Beaumont joined the Royal Navy as a boy in 1860 and was engaged in operations in Malaya by 1875. Between 1875 and 1876 he took part as senior lieutenant in the British Arctic Expedition led by George Nares on HMS Discovery, an attempt to reach the North Pole and to explore the northwest coast of Greenland. Beaumont led a dogsled party that reached Sherard Osborn Fjord in May 1876 and left a cairn at Repulse Harbour.

He was given command of HMS Excellent in 1893, before becoming Director of Naval Intelligence in 1895.

He went on to be Commander-in-Chief, Pacific Station in 1899 and Commander-in-Chief, Australia Station in 1900. During his time in Australia, he had HMS Royal Arthur as his flagship, and he was knighted as a Knight Commander of the Order of St Michael and St George (KCMG) on the occasion of the visit to Australia of the Duke and Duchess of Cornwall and York (later King George V and Queen Mary). He was promoted to vice-admiral on 9 September 1902, and left Australia in January 1903 returning to the United Kingdom via New Zealand and the United States.

On his return, he took up the position of Commander-in-Chief, Plymouth, serving as such until 1908. He was promoted to admiral in 1906. He was First and Principal Naval Aide-de-Camp to the King in 1911. He retired in 1912.

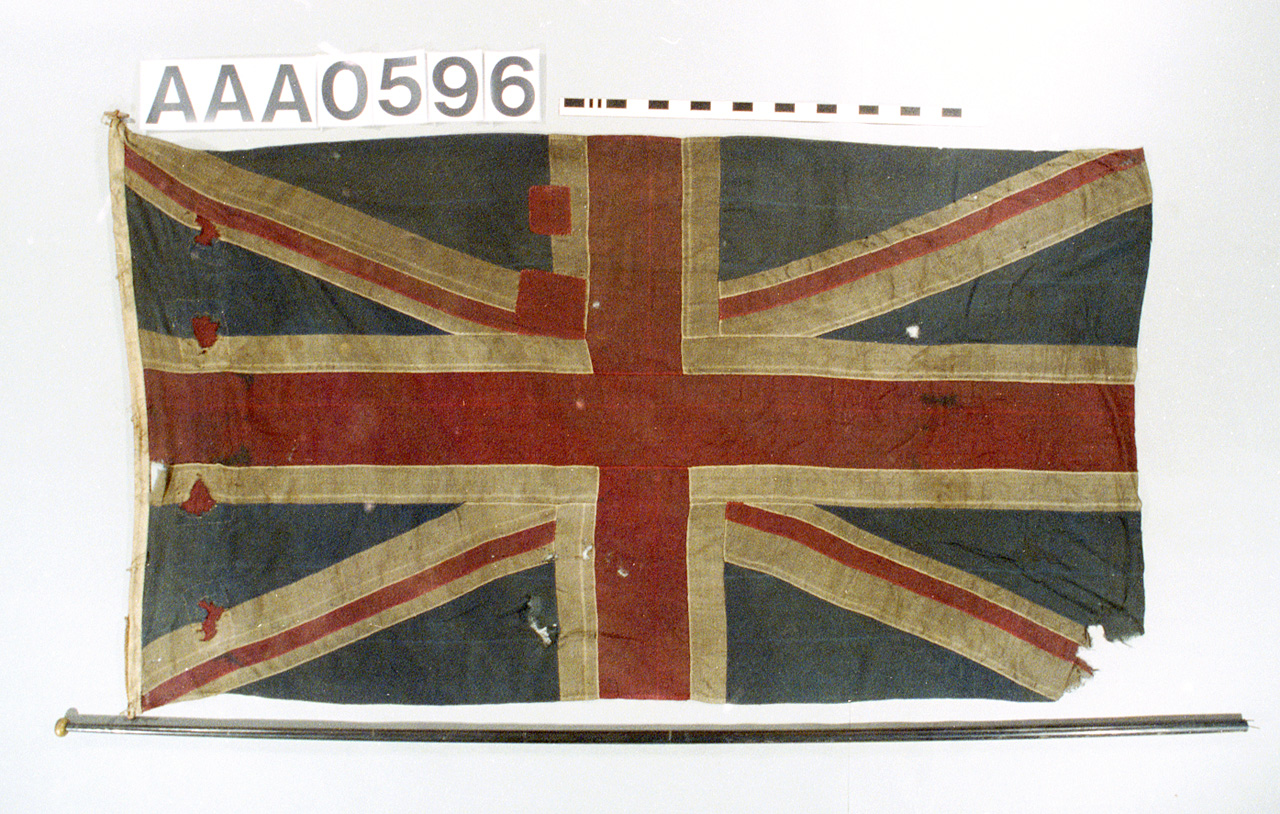
British flag left at a depot on Repulse Harbour by then Lieutenant Lewis Beaumont during Captain Nares' British Arctic Expedition.

Beaumont was appointed a Knight Commander of the Order of the Bath in the 1904 Birthday Honours and promoted to Knight Grand Cross (GCB) in the 1911 Coronation Honours.

== Personal ==
In 1889 Beaumont married Mary Eleanor Perkins (died 1907), daughter of Charles C. Perkins, of Boston, U.S.

Military offices
Preceded by Cyprian Bridge	Director of Naval Intelligence; 1895–1899	Succeeded by Reginald Custance
Preceded by Henry Palliser	Commander-in-Chief, Pacific Station; 1899–1900	Succeeded by Andrew Bickford
Preceded by Hugo Pearson	Commander-in-Chief, Australia Station; 1900–1903	Succeeded by Sir Arthur Fanshawe
Preceded by Lord Charles Montagu Douglas Scott	Commander-in-Chief, Plymouth; 1903–1908	Succeeded by Sir Wilmot Fawkes
Honorary titles
Preceded by Sir Jackie Fisher	First and Principal Naval Aide-de-Camp; 1911–1913	Succeeded by Sir Edmund Poë
