= Emanuel Kayser =

German geologist and palaeontologist (1845–1927)

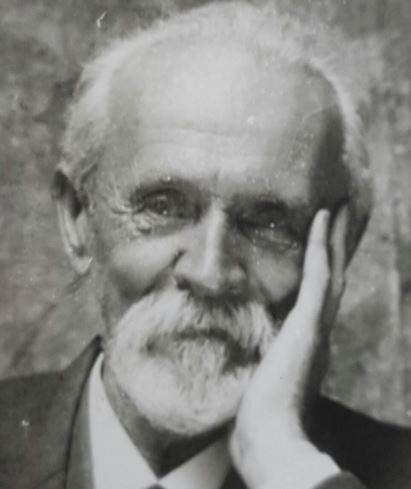
Emanuel Kayser

Friedrich Heinrich Emanuel Kayser (26 March 1845 – 29 November 1927) was a German geologist and palaeontologist, born in Königsberg.

He was educated at the universities of Halle, Heidelberg and Berlin, where in 1871 he qualified as a lecturer in geology. From 1873 he worked as a state geologist for the Preußischen Geologischen Landesanstalt (Prussian Geological Survey), and in 1881 became a professor at the Berlin Mining Academy. In 1885 he succeeded Wilhelm Dunker as professor of geology and paleontology at the University of Marburg.

He is known for his work involving the stratigraphy, tectonics and paleontology of Paleozoic formations in Germany; especially the Harz and the Rhenish Massif. With Wilhelm Dames, he was co-editor of the journal Paläontologischen Abhandlungen.

Among his separate works are Lehrbuch der Geologie (2 vols.): ii. Geologische Formationskunde (1891; 2nd ed., 1902), and i. Allgemeine Geologie (1893); vol. ii. (the volume first issued) was translated and edited by Philip Lake, under the title Textbook of Comparative Geology (1893). Another work is Beiträge zur Kenntniss der Fauna der Siegenschen Grauwacke (1892).

== Posthumous honours ==
Kayser Bjerg, a mountain in Greenland, was named after him.
