= 119th meridian east =

Line of longitude

119th meridian east (interactive map)

The meridian 119° east of Greenwich is a line of longitude that extends from the North Pole across the Arctic Ocean, Asia, the Indian Ocean, Australasia, the Southern Ocean, and Antarctica to the South Pole.

The 119th meridian east forms a great circle with the 61st meridian west.

== From Pole to Pole ==
Starting at the North Pole and heading south to the South Pole, the 119th meridian east passes through:

Co-ordinates	Country, territory or sea	Notes
90°0′N 119°0′E	Arctic Ocean	
78°29′N 119°0′E	Laptev Sea	
73°7′N 119°0′E	Russia	Sakha Republic; Irkutsk Oblast — from 58°33′N 119°0′E; Zabaykalsky Krai — from 58°14′N 119°0′E
49°59′N 119°0′E	China	Inner Mongolia
47°44′N 119°0′E	Mongolia	
46°47′N 119°0′E	China	Inner Mongolia; Hebei – from 41°15′N 119°0′E; Liaoning – from 41°3′N 119°0′E; Hebei – from 40°38′N 119°0′E
39°12′N 119°0′E	Bohai Sea	
37°56′N 119°0′E	China	Shandong
37°38′N 119°0′E	Bohai Sea	Laizhou Bay
37°17′N 119°0′E	China	Shandong; Jiangsu – from 35°2′N 119°0′E; Anhui – from 32°56′N 119°0′E; Jiangsu – from 32°33′N 119°0′E; Anhui – from 31°14′N 119°0′E; Zhejiang – from 30°18′N 119°0′E; Fujian – from 27°26′N 119°0′E
24°56′N 119°0′E	South China Sea	
10°27′N 119°0′E	Philippines	Island of Palawan
10°0′N 119°0′E	Sulu Sea	
5°25′N 119°0′E	Malaysia	Sabah – island of Borneo
5°3′N 119°0′E	Celebes Sea	Passing just east of Cape Mangkalihat, Borneo, Indonesia (at 1°1′N 118°59′E)
1°1′N 119°0′E	Makassar Strait	
2°37′S 119°0′E	Indonesia	Island of Sulawesi
3°32′S 119°0′E	Makassar Strait	
5°24′S 119°0′E	Java Sea	
6°20′S 119°0′E	Flores Sea	Passing by numerous small islands of Indonesia (at 6°50′S 119°0′E); Passing just west of the island of Sangeang, Indonesia (at 8°12′S 119°0′E)
8°24′S 119°0′E	Indonesia	Island of Sumbawa
8°45′S 119°0′E	Sumba Strait	
9°27′S 119°0′E	Indonesia	Island of Sumba
9°38′S 119°0′E	Indian Ocean	
20°2′S 119°0′E	Australia	Western Australia
34°27′S 119°0′E	Indian Ocean	Australian authorities consider this to be part of the Southern Ocean
60°0′S 119°0′E	Southern Ocean	
66°55′S 119°0′E	Antarctica	Australian Antarctic Territory, claimed by Australia

== See also ==
- 118th meridian east
- 120th meridian east
