= Ilikok Island =

Island in Nunavut, Canada

- Location within Nunavut Location within Canada

Geography
- Location: Labrador Sea
- Coordinates: 65°17′N 63°15′W
- Archipelago: Arctic Archipelago
- Area: 29 km^{2} (11 sq mi)

Administration
- Canada
- Nunavut: Nunavut
- Region: Qikiqtaaluk

Demographics
- Population: Uninhabited
- Source: Ilikok Island at Atlas of Canada

Ilikok Island is an uninhabited island in the Qikiqtaaluk Region of Nunavut, Canada. It is located in the Labrador Sea, off southeastern Baffin Island's Cumberland Peninsula. Muingmak Island is in the immediate vicinity.

Ilikok Island is 29 km^{2} (11 sq mi) in size.
