= Hall Land =

Peninsula in Greenland

- Location within Greenland
- Interactive map of Hall Land

Geography
- Location: NW Greenland
- Coordinates: 81°11′N 59°0′W
- Adjacent to: Hall Basin; Newman Bay
- Length: 150 km (93 mi)
- Width: 70 km (43 mi)
- Highest elevation: 1,094 m (3589 ft)
- Highest point: Kayser Mountain

Administration
- Greenland (Denmark)

Hall Land is a peninsula in far northwestern Greenland. It is a part of the Northeast Greenland National Park. Hall Land is one of the coldest places in Greenland.

Hall Land is the western limit of the Northeast Greenland National Park and for the Sirius Dog Sled Patrol.

== History ==
Hall Land was named after Charles Francis Hall, leader of the 1871 Polaris expedition.

Ruins have been found in and around Hall Land, including at Atka Elv, Cape Buddington, Solbakken, Kystvolden, Bellevue, and on Offley Island which is off the southwestern coast.

The last live caribou reported from Northern Greenland were seen in Hall Land in 1922. They were most likely Peary caribou that had strayed across the Robeson Channel from Ellesmere Island, about 21 km (13 mi) to the northwest. Hall Land is the closest point of mainland Greenland to Canada.

The closest caribou herd in Greenland to Hall Land today is in Inglefield Land, about 250 km (155 mi) to the southwest at the closest points between the landmasses.

== Geography ==
Hall Land is located to the northeast of Daugaard-Jensen Land and Washington Land and to the southwest of Nyeboe Land. It is surrounded to the north by the Robeson Channel of the Nares Strait and to the east by the Newman Bay. Hall Basin, the Petermann Fjord and the Petermann Glacier mark the western limits of Hall Land. To the south and southeast the peninsula is attached to the mainland and its ice cap. South of Hall Land across the ice cap and east of Petermann Glacier lies Hellerup Land, a nunatak.

The unglaciated Polaris Foreland lies in the northern half of Hall Land beyond the Haug Range, while the southern half of Hall Land is ice cap. 1,094 metres (3,589 ft) high Kayser Mountain, the highest elevation of the peninsula, is located at the northeastern end of the range.

Map of the Nares Strait area.

=== Climate ===
Hall Land experiences a tundra climate (Köppen: ET); with short, cool summers and long, severely frigid winters.

Climate data for Hall Land (81º41'N, 59º57'W, 105 m (344 ft) m AMSL) (1982-1999 data)
Month	Jan	Feb	Mar	Apr	May	Jun	Jul	Aug	Sep	Oct	Nov	Dec	Year
Record high °C (°F)	−18.1 (−0.6)	−9.5 (14.9)	−15.3 (4.5)	−4.5 (23.9)	3.1 (37.6)	13.7 (56.7)	15.3 (59.5)	16.1 (61.0)	8.8 (47.8)	−6.9 (19.6)	−6.7 (19.9)	−17.2 (1.0)	16.1 (61.0)
Mean daily maximum °C (°F)	−33.2 (−27.8)	−31.7 (−25.1)	−32.0 (−25.6)	−21.6 (−6.9)	−9.0 (15.8)	2.0 (35.6)	6.8 (44.2)	4.0 (39.2)	−5.7 (21.7)	−18.5 (−1.3)	−25.5 (−13.9)	−31.3 (−24.3)	−16.3 (2.7)
Daily mean °C (°F)	−35.9 (−32.6)	−34.3 (−29.7)	−34.7 (−30.5)	−24.3 (−11.7)	−11.2 (11.8)	0.4 (32.7)	5.1 (41.2)	2.4 (36.3)	−8.0 (17.6)	−21.5 (−6.7)	−28.6 (−19.5)	−33.9 (−29.0)	−18.7 (−1.7)
Mean daily minimum °C (°F)	−38.5 (−37.3)	−36.9 (−34.4)	−37.6 (−35.7)	−27.6 (−17.7)	−14.0 (6.8)	−1.4 (29.5)	3.2 (37.8)	0.4 (32.7)	−10.5 (13.1)	−24.8 (−12.6)	−31.6 (−24.9)	−36.7 (−34.1)	−21.3 (−6.3)
Record low °C (°F)	−52.1 (−61.8)	−51.7 (−61.1)	−50.5 (−58.9)	−42.5 (−44.5)	−28.5 (−19.3)	−15.3 (4.5)	−3.8 (25.2)	−13.6 (7.5)	−30.4 (−22.7)	−37.9 (−36.2)	−44.8 (−48.6)	−47.4 (−53.3)	−52.1 (−61.8)
Average relative humidity (%)	78.5	79.4	79.6	84.7	88.9	84.1	80.4	81.7	86.9	84.2	81.5	78.9	82.4
Source: Danish Meteorological Institute (1991-1996 data) (1982-1999 record lows)

== See also ==
- Sirius Dog Sled Patrol
