= Petermann Glacier =

Glacier in Greenland

- Petermann Gletscher
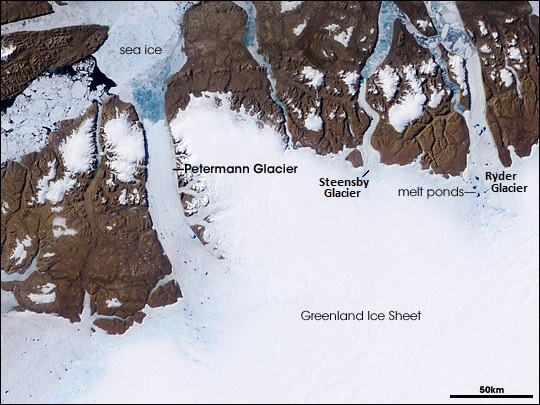
- NASA satellite image.

- Location within Greenland
- Location: Greenland
- Coordinates: 80°45′N 60°45′W
- Length: 70 km (43 mi)
- Width: 15 km (9.3 mi)
- Thickness: 600 m (2,000 ft)
- Terminus: Petermann Fjord; Hall Basin

Petermann Glacier (Danish: Petermann Gletsjer) is a large glacier located in North-West Greenland to the east of Nares Strait. It connects the Greenland ice sheet to the Arctic Ocean at 81°10' north latitude, near Hans Island.

The glacier and its fjord are named after German cartographer August Heinrich Petermann.

== Geography ==
The tidewater glacier consists of a 70 km (43 mi) long and 15 km (9 mi) wide floating ice tongue whose thickness changes from about 600 m (2,000 ft) at its grounding line to about 30–80 metres (100–260 ft) at its front. Rough mass balance estimates using these scales suggest that about 80% of its mass is lost as basal meltwater, yet little oceanographic data are available to connect Petermann Glacier to its fjord and adjacent Nares Strait. Even the sill depth and location is largely unknown, as modern soundings of the fjord, with its mouth located between Cape Morton and Cape Tyson, are still lacking. Petermann Glacier marks the western limit of Hall Land and the eastern limit of Daugaard-Jensen Land. The Petermann Peninsula flanks its northern end. The grounding line is relatively stable with on average 470 m variation over the period 1992 to 2011. This indicates that the glacier was dynamically stable.

== Satellite imagery ==
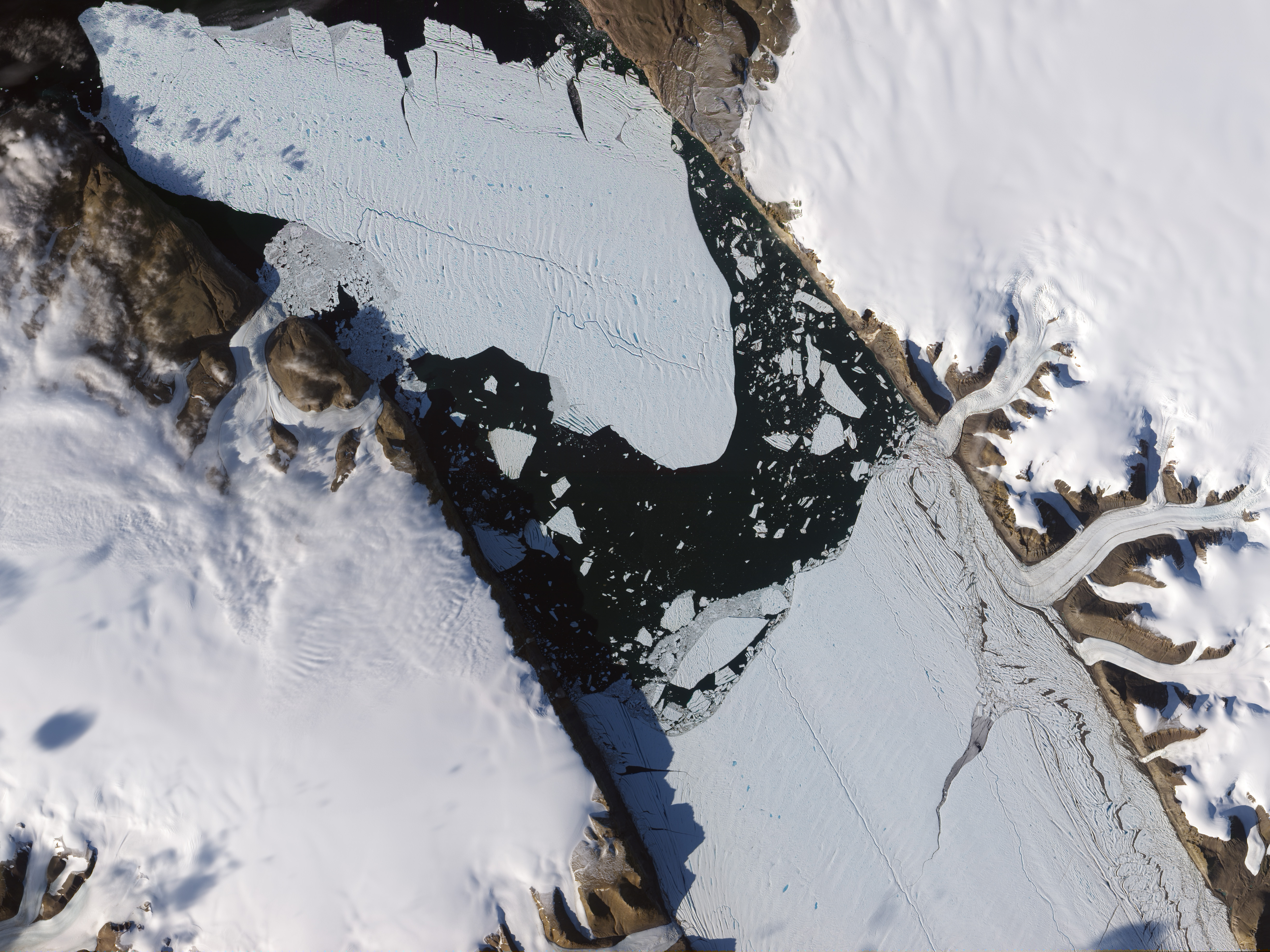
Natural-colour satellite image of the ice island that calved off the glacier on August 5, 2010.

A series of satellite images from 2002 through 2009 illustrate that the terminus of the glacier has advanced towards the ocean, however, several lateral rifts have developed also. The distance of this rifts or cracks back from the terminus has diminished for this time period also and may serve as a precursor to natural ice calving from Petermann Glacier. A large chunk estimated to be 100 square miles (260 km^{2}) calved off the glacier in August, 2010. The Danish Meteorological Institutes maintains an archive of imagery of Petermann Glacier and adjacent coastal areas of Greenland from both European and US satellites and sensors such as Envisat, MODIS, and AVHRR.

Data from Operation IceBridge show a 750 km long subglacial canyon running from the center of the island northward to the fjord of the Petermann Glacier. Dubbed "Greenland Grand Canyon" by media, the bottom is below sea level, and the canyon is likely to have influenced basal water flow from the ice sheet interior to the margin. The canyon predates ice sheet inception and has influenced basal hydrology in Greenland over past glacial cycles.

== Ship-based science explorations 2003–2015 ==
The US Coast Guard icebreaker "USCGC Healy" entered the fjord on August 11, 2003 to survey bottom topography, ocean currents, and ocean chemistry as part of a larger program funded by the US National Science Foundation to better understand rates and mechanism by which Arctic sources of fresh water may impact the climate states of the North Atlantic. The program was continued as part of the Canadian International Polar Year projects when the CCGS Henry Larsen entered the fjord in 2007 and 2009.

In 2009, scientists aboard the Greenpeace ship Arctic Sunrise conducted multi-disciplinary measurements at Petermann glacier to document the anticipated detachment of a large area of the glacier to obtain insight into glacier dynamics and to highlight glacier response to ongoing Arctic climate warming ahead of the Copenhagen summit.

During the summer of 2015, the Swedish icebreaker Oden served as the platform for the research carried out in the sea, on the glacier and on land. The purpose of the Swedish-American research expedition was to collect multibeam bathymetry and sub-bottom profile information along the western continental shelf of Greenland in order to characterize the shape of the seafloor and uppermost sediment properties. The main goal was to increase the understanding about potential pathways of relative warmer water influx towards Greenland's many outlet glaciers. A program involving both seismic data acquisition, multibeam mapping, coring and seismic reflection profiling was conducted in order to study the past behaviour of the Petermann Glacier.

== Ice loss ==
Time-lapse imagery from July 9 to Sept. 13 2012 shows an ice island calve from Petermann Glacier and pass through Nares Strait.

In August 2010, a giant iceberg measuring 260 square kilometres (100 sq mi) broke off from the floating portion of Petermann Glacier reducing its area and volume by about 25% and 10%, respectively. Researchers from the Canadian Ice Service located the calving from NASA satellite images taken on August 5; Patrick Lockerby re-posted cropped NASA images with interpretations on the internet the same day. It was the largest Arctic iceberg to calve since 1962, however, it is unclear whether the event was related to global warming or not. The Select Committee on Energy Independence and Global Warming of the US House of Representatives held hearings on Petermann Glacier and the Greenland icesheet within days of the 2010 break-up.

The National Ice Center named the new iceberg, the Petermann Ice Island (2010) to differentiate it from a similar calving event two years earlier which produced Petermann Ice Island (2008). That island was tracked by the Canadian Ice Service for over a year as it travelled out into Nares Strait and south through Baffin Bay before losing contact with the remnants in Frobisher Bay in July 2009.

On July 15/16 2012, a 130-square-kilometre (50 sq mi) piece (about twice the area of Manhattan), calved from the northern tip of the glacier. A long crack at the site had been observed by NASA satellites for several years prior to the split.

== Developments 2010–2026 ==
The Peterman glacier has shrunk several kilometers in length since 2002. The development can be seen on NASA Satellite Imagery.

Ice calving from Petermann Glacier in 2010.

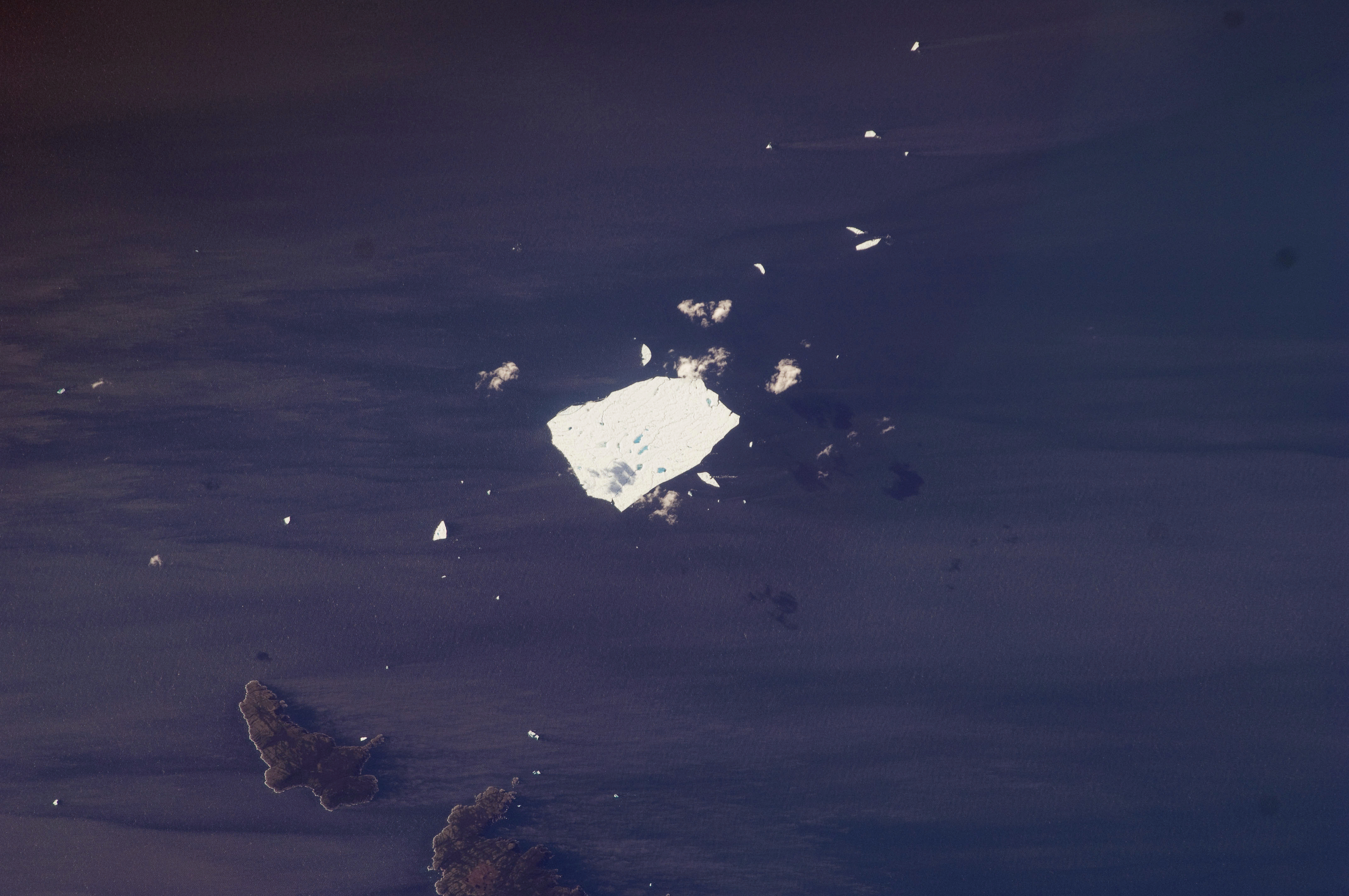
Astronauts on the International Space Station used a digital camera to capture this view of Petermann Ice Island A, fragment 2, off of the north-east coast of Newfoundland.

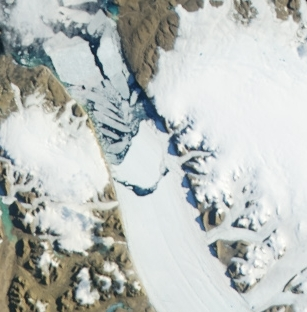
July 16, 2012 calving event.

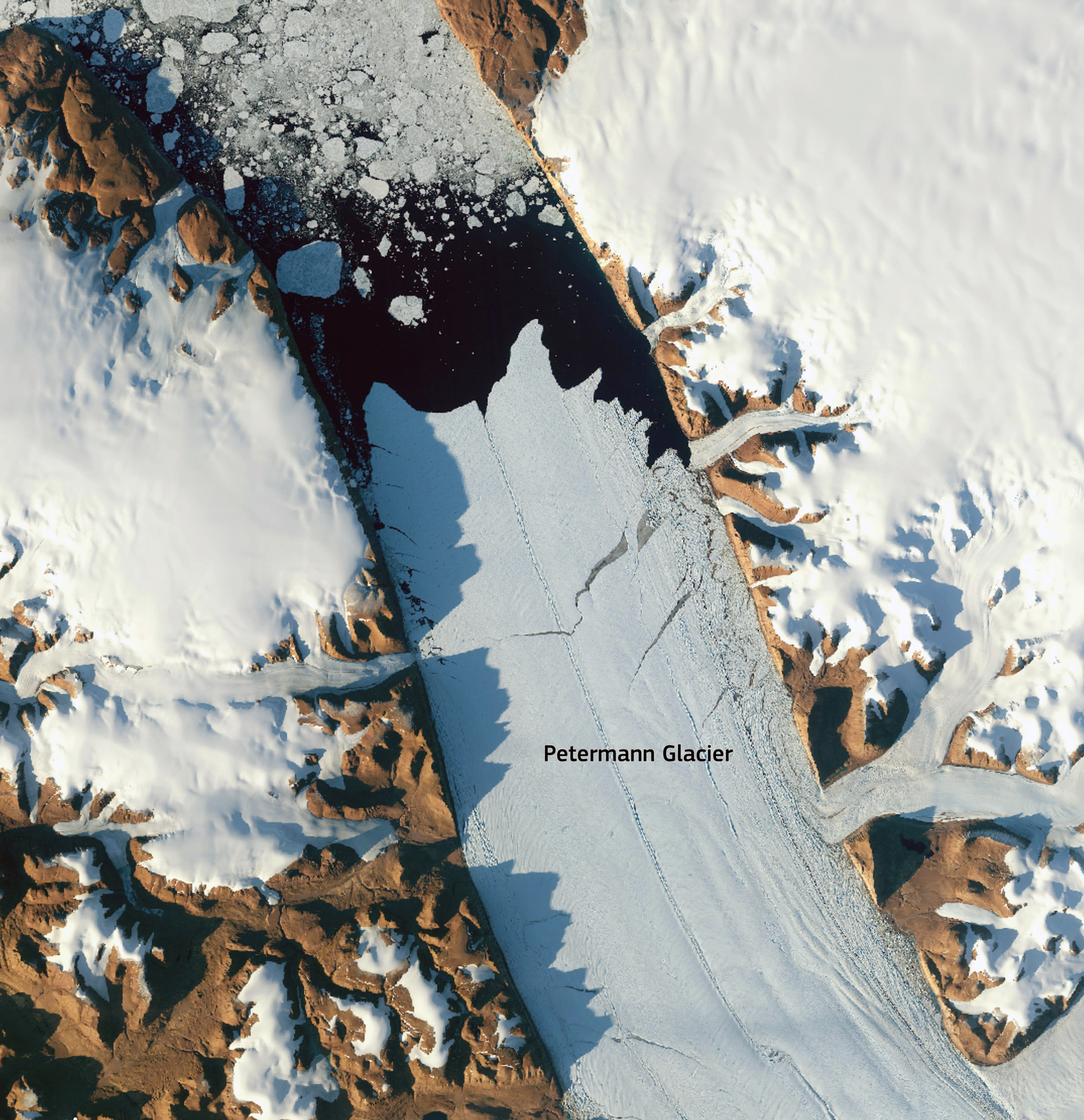
The glacier in October 2022.

A new crack was seen in 2017.

As of May 2023, the major Greenland Glacier is melting away which could add to the rise in sea-level. The glacier's grounding line can shift significantly with the tides. The glacier is not growing and claims that it is have been attributed to climate change deniers. A study of the glacier's grounding zone in December 2023 established that melting has been accelerating.

A 76-square-kilometre (29 sq mi) 150 m (490 ft) thick piece to calved from the eastern part of the northern tip of the glacier on August 4, 2026, which was the most significant calving event in the Arctic since 2020.

== Ship-based science exploration 2027 ==
In summer 2027, a team of scientists from the British Antarctic Survey will operate from the RRS Sir David Attenborough and take new measurements of the glacier as part of the £20 million Greenland Ice sheet to Atlantic Tipping (GIANT) initiative.

== See also ==
- List of glaciers in Greenland
- Retreat of glaciers since 1850
