= 120th meridian east =

Line of longitude

120th meridian east (interactive map)

The meridian 120° east of Greenwich is a line of longitude that extends from the North Pole across the Arctic Ocean, Asia, the Indian Ocean, Australia, the Southern Ocean, and Antarctica to the South Pole. In mean solar time this offset is the UTC+08:00 time zone.

The 120th meridian east forms a great ellipse with the 60th meridian west. The 120th meridian east is the easternmost of South China Sea, according to Vietnam's typhoon warning region.

== From Pole to Pole ==
Starting at the North Pole and heading south to the South Pole, the 120th meridian east passes through:

| Co-ordinates | Country, territory or sea | Notes |
|---|---|---|
| 90°0′N 120°0′E | Arctic Ocean | |
| 78°22′N 120°0′E | Laptev Sea | |
| 73°10′N 120°0′E | Russia | Sakha Republic; Amur Oblast — from 56°55′N 120°0′E; Zabaykalsky Krai — from 56°30′N 120°0′E |
| 51°31′N 120°0′E | China | Inner Mongolia; Liaoning – from 41°42′N 120°0′E |
| 40°4′N 120°0′E | Bohai Sea | |
| 37°25′N 120°0′E | China | Shandong (Shandong Peninsula) |
| 35°43′N 120°0′E | Yellow Sea | |
| 34°26′N 120°0′E | China | Jiangsu; Zhejiang – from 31°1′N 120°0′E, passing just west of Hangzhou (at 30°15′N 120°10′E); Fujian – from 27°19′N 120°0′E |
| 26°36′N 120°0′E | East China Sea | |
| 25°23′N 120°0′E | South China Sea | Passing through the Taiwan Strait, just west of the island of Taiwan, Republic of China (at 23°5′N 120°2′E) |
| 16°20′N 120°0′E | Philippines | Islands of Cabarruyan and Luzon |
| 15°17′N 120°0′E | South China Sea | Passing just west of the Lubang Islands, Philippines (at 13°53′N 120°1′E) |
| 12°16′N 120°0′E | Philippines | Islands of Busuanga and Culion |
| 11°41′N 120°0′E | Sulu Sea | |
| 10°34′N 120°0′E | Philippines | Island of Dumaran |
| 10°33′N 120°0′E | Sulu Sea | Passing through Tubbataha Reef, Philippines (at 8°55′N 120°0′E) |
| 5°56′N 120°0′E | Philippines | Island of Laparan |
| 5°52′N 120°0′E | Sulu Sea | |
| 5°14′N 120°0′E | Philippines | Islands of Tawi-Tawi and Bilatan |
| 4°57′N 120°0′E | Celebes Sea | |
| 1°12′N 120°0′E | Makassar Strait | |
| 0°29′N 120°0′E | Indonesia | Island of Sulawesi |
| 5°34′S 120°0′E | Flores Sea | |
| 8°27′S 120°0′E | Indonesia | Island of Flores |
| 8°49′S 120°0′E | Sumba Strait | |
| 9°22′S 120°0′E | Indonesia | Island of Sumba |
| 10°2′S 120°0′E | Indian Ocean | |
| 19°56′S 120°0′E | Australia | Western Australia |
| 33°56′S 120°0′E | Indian Ocean | Australian authorities consider this to be part of the Southern Ocean |
| 60°0′S 120°0′E | Southern Ocean | |
| 66°52′S 120°0′E | Antarctica | Australian Antarctic Territory, claimed by Australia |

== See also ==
- 119th meridian east
- 121st meridian east
