= 117th meridian east =

Line of longitude

117th meridian east (interactive map)

The meridian 117° east of Greenwich is a line of longitude that extends from the North Pole across the Arctic Ocean, Asia, the Indian Ocean, Australasia, the Southern Ocean, and Antarctica to the South Pole.

The 117th meridian east forms a great circle with the 63rd meridian west.

== From Pole to Pole ==
Starting at the North Pole and heading south to the South Pole, the 117th meridian east passes through:

Co-ordinates	Country, territory or sea	Notes
90°0′N 117°0′E	Arctic Ocean	
78°42′N 117°0′E	Laptev Sea	
73°37′N 117°0′E	Russia	Sakha Republic; Irkutsk Oblast — from 60°8′N 117°0′E; Zabaykalsky Krai — from 56°48′N 117°0′E
49°43′N 117°0′E	China	Inner Mongolia
47°51′N 117°0′E	Mongolia	
46°21′N 117°0′E	China	Inner Mongolia; Hebei – from 42°25′N 117°0′E; Beijing – from 40°40′N 117°0′E; Hebei – from 40°0′N 117°0′E; Tianjin – from 39°36′N 117°0′E; Hebei – from 38°40′N 117°0′E; Shandong – from 37°50′N 117°0′E, passing through Jinan (at 36°39′N 116°58′E); Jiangsu – from 34°43′N 117°0′E; Anhui – from 34°15′N 117°0′E; Jiangxi – from 29°40′N 117°0′E; Fujian – from 27°7′N 117°0′E; Guangdong – from 23°45′N 117°0′E, mainland and island of Nan'ao
23°25′N 117°0′E	South China Sea	Passing through the disputed Spratly Islands
8°6′N 117°0′E	Philippines	Balabac Island
23°25′N 117°0′E	South China Sea	Balabac Strait
7°21′N 117°0′E	Malaysia	Sabah – Balambangan Island
7°17′N 117°0′E	South China Sea	Marudu Bay
6°47′N 117°0′E	Malaysia	Sabah – island of Borneo
4°21′N 117°0′E	Indonesia	North Kalimantan; East Kalimantan; Future capital of Indonesia; East Kalimantan (Balikpapan)
1°12′S 117°0′E	Makassar Strait	
4°29′S 117°0′E	Java Sea	
7°27′S 117°0′E	Bali Sea	
8°24′S 117°0′E	Indonesia	Island of Sumbawa
9°6′S 117°0′E	Indian Ocean	
20°39′S 117°0′E	Australia	Western Australia
35°2′S 117°0′E	Indian Ocean	Australian authorities consider this to be part of the Southern Ocean
60°0′S 117°0′E	Southern Ocean	
66°49′S 117°0′E	Antarctica	Australian Antarctic Territory, claimed by Australia

== See also ==
- 116th meridian east
- 118th meridian east
