= Isla Bermejo =

Island in Argentina

Coordinates: 39°01′S 62°01′W

Isla Bermejo is an island that is part of the eastern coast of Argentina, forming part of a row of islands that stand at the entrance of the ria of Bahía Blanca near the city of Bahía Blanca.
