= 116th meridian east =

Line of longitude

116th meridian east (interactive map)

The meridian 116° east of Greenwich is a line of longitude that extends from the North Pole across the Arctic Ocean, Asia, the Indian Ocean, Australasia, the Southern Ocean, and Antarctica to the South Pole.

The 116th meridian east forms a great circle with the 64th meridian west.

== From Pole to Pole ==
Starting at the North Pole and heading south to the South Pole, the 116th meridian east passes through:

| Co-ordinates | Country, territory or sea | Notes |
|---|---|---|
| 90°0′N 116°0′E | Arctic Ocean | |
| 78°49′N 116°0′E | Laptev Sea | |
| 74°21′N 116°0′E | Russia | Sakha Republic — Peschanyy Island |
| 74°16′N 116°0′E | Laptev Sea | |
| 73°41′N 116°0′E | Russia | Sakha Republic; Irkutsk Oblast — from 60°28′N 116°0′E; Republic of Buryatia — from 57°14′N 116°0′E; Irkutsk Oblast — from 57°3′N 116°0′E; Zabaykalsky Krai — from 56°52′N 116°0′E; Republic of Buryatia — from 55°22′N 116°0′E; Zabaykalsky Krai — from 54°28′N 116°0′E |
| 49°59′N 116°0′E | Mongolia | |
| 48°42′N 116°0′E | China | Inner Mongolia |
| 47°43′N 116°0′E | Mongolia | |
| 45°38′N 116°0′E | China | Inner Mongolia; Hebei – from 41°46′N 116°0′E; Beijing – from 40°34′N 116°0′E; Hebei – from 39°32′N 116°0′E; Shandong – from 37°21′N 116°0′E; Henan – for about 8 km from 36°3′N 116°0′E; Shandong – from 35°58′N 116°0′E; Henan – from 34°34′N 116°0′E; Anhui – from 33°52′N 116°0′E; Hubei – for about 10 km from 31°1′N 116°0′E; Anhui – from 30°57′N 116°0′E; Hubei – from 30°14′N 116°0′E; Jiangxi – from 29°44′N 116°0′E, passing just east of Nanchang (at 28°40′N 115°53′E); Fujian – from 25°27′N 116°0′E; Guangdong – from 24°51′N 116°0′E |
| 22°50′N 116°0′E | South China Sea | Passing through the disputed Spratly Islands |
| 5°48′N 116°0′E | Malaysia | Sabah – on the island of Borneo |
| 4°21′N 116°0′E | Indonesia | North Kalimantan; East Kalimantan; South Kalimantan |
| 3°31′S 116°0′E | Java Sea | Passing just west of Laut Island, Indonesia (at 3°41′S 116°1′E); Passing just east of the Kangean Islands, Indonesia (at 6°57′S 115°55′E) |
| 7°12′S 116°0′E | Bali Sea | |
| 8°44′S 116°0′E | Indonesia | Island of Lombok |
| 8°54′S 116°0′E | Indian Ocean | |
| 21°2′S 116°0′E | Australia | Western Australia – passing just east of Perth (at 31°57′S 115°52′E) |
| 34°51′S 116°0′E | Indian Ocean | Australian authorities consider this to be part of the Southern Ocean |
| 60°0′S 116°0′E | Southern Ocean | |
| 66°21′S 116°0′E | Antarctica | Australian Antarctic Territory, claimed by Australia |

== See also ==
- 115th meridian east
- 117th meridian east
