= 118th meridian east =

Line of longitude

118th meridian east (interactive map)

The meridian 118° east of Greenwich is a line of longitude that extends from the North Pole across the Arctic Ocean, Asia, the Indian Ocean, Australasia, the Southern Ocean, and Antarctica to the South Pole.

The 118th meridian east forms a great circle with the 62nd meridian west.

== From Pole to Pole ==
Starting at the North Pole and heading south to the South Pole, the 118th meridian east passes through:

Co-ordinates	Country, territory or sea	Notes
90°0′N 118°0′E	Arctic Ocean	
78°36′N 118°0′E	Laptev Sea	
73°35′N 118°0′E	Russia	Sakha Republic; Irkutsk Oblast — from 59°34′N 118°0′E; Zabaykalsky Krai — from 58°25′N 118°0′E
49°36′N 118°0′E	China	Inner Mongolia
48°2′N 118°0′E	Mongolia	
46°37′N 118°0′E	China	Inner Mongolia; Hebei – for about 17 km from 42°25′N 118°0′E; Inner Mongolia – for about 4 km from 42°16′N 118°0′E; Hebei – from 42°13′N 118°0′E; Tianjin – from 39°21′N 118°0′E
39°13′N 118°0′E	Bohai Sea	
38°11′N 118°0′E	China	Shandong; Jiangsu – from 34°38′N 118°0′E; Anhui – from 33°45′N 118°0′E; Jiangsu – from 33°22′N 118°0′E; Anhui – from 33°12′N 118°0′E; Jiangxi – from 29°31′N 118°0′E; Fujian – from 27°59′N 118°0′E, passing just west of Xiamen (at 24°27′N 118°4′E)
24°11′N 118°0′E	South China Sea	Passing just east of the disputed Scarborough Shoal (at 15°7′N 117°51′E)
9°14′N 118°0′E	Philippines	Island of Palawan
8°53′N 118°0′E	Sulu Sea	
6°3′N 118°0′E	Malaysia	Sabah – island of Borneo
4°13′N 118°0′E	Celebes Sea	
2°24′N 118°0′E	Indonesia	East Kalimantan – island of Borneo
2°12′N 118°0′E	Celebes Sea	
1°47′N 118°0′E	Indonesia	East Kalimantan – island of Borneo
0°47′N 118°0′E	Makassar Strait	
4°57′S 118°0′E	Java Sea	Passing by numerous small islands of Indonesia
6°59′S 118°0′E	Flores Sea	Passing by numerous small islands of Indonesia
8°6′S 118°0′E	Indonesia	Island of Sumbawa
8°52′S 118°0′E	Indian Ocean	
20°28′S 118°0′E	Australia	Western Australia
35°6′S 118°0′E	Indian Ocean	Australian authorities consider this to be part of the Southern Ocean
60°0′S 118°0′E	Southern Ocean	
66°59′S 118°0′E	Antarctica	Australian Antarctic Territory, claimed by Australia

== See also ==
- 117th meridian east
- 119th meridian east
