= Muingmak Island =

Island in Nunavut, Canada

- Location within Nunavut Location within Canada

Geography
- Location: Labrador Sea
- Coordinates: 65°17′N 63°01′W
- Archipelago: Arctic Archipelago
- Area: 8 km^{2} (3.1 sq mi)

Administration
- Canada
- Nunavut: Nunavut
- Region: Qikiqtaaluk

Demographics
- Population: Uninhabited
- Source: Muingmak Island at Atlas of Canada

Muingmak Island is an uninhabited island in the Qikiqtaaluk Region of Nunavut, Canada. It is located in the Labrador Sea, off southeastern Baffin Island's Cumberland Peninsula. Ilikok Island is in the immediate vicinity.

Muingmak Island is 8 km^{2} (3.1 sq mi) in size.
