= Washington Land Group =

Geologic formation in Greenland

- Stratigraphic range: Silurian
- Type: Group

Location
- Country: Greenland

Type section
- Named for: Washington Land

The Washington Land Group is a geologic group in Greenland. It preserves fossils dating back to the Silurian period.

== See also ==
- List of fossiliferous stratigraphic units in Greenland
