= Hannah Island (Greenland) =

Island in Greenland

Hannah Ø
- Location within Greenland

Geography
- Location: Kennedy Channel; Nares Strait
- Coordinates: 81.13333°N 63.41667°W
- Area: 0.5 km^{2} (0.19 sq mi)
- Length: 0.9 km (0.56 mi)
- Width: 0.6 km (0.37 mi)
- Highest elevation: 36 m (118 ft)

Administration
- Greenland
- Municipality: Avannaata

Demographics
- Population: 0

Hannah Island (Danish: Hannah Ø) is an island of the Nares Strait, Greenland. Administratively it belongs to the Avannaata municipality.

== History ==
Hannah Island was named after Hannah (Tookoolito), an Inuk guide who accompanied Charles Francis Hall in the 1871 Polaris expedition.

Archaeological ruins have been observed on Hannah Island indicating settlement by the Dorset culture and potentially the Thule culture.

== Geography ==
Hannah Island lies in the mouth of Bessel Fjord and northeast of Cape Bryan by the Kennedy Channel. The waters around the island are frozen most of the year.

The island consists of a huge mound of pebbles and drift, probably the deposit of an ancient glacier. It has an area of 0.5 km^{2} and an elevation of 36 meters. Lichens and lichenicolous fungi grow on the island.

Map of part of Ellesmere Island and far Northern Greenland.

== See also ==
- List of islands of Greenland
- List of features in Greenland named after Greenlandic Inuit

== Bibliography ==
- Edward L. Moss, Shores of the polar sea
