= Nyeboe Land =

Greenland peninsula

- Location within Greenland
- Interactive map of Nyeboe Land

Geography
- Location: NW Greenland
- Coordinates: 81°43′N 56°30′W
- Adjacent to: Newman Bay; Saint George Fjord
- Length: 130 km (81 mi)
- Width: 90 km (56 mi)
- Highest elevation: 1,100 m (3600 ft)
- Highest point: Punch Mountain

Administration
- Greenland (Denmark)

Demographics
- Population: Uninhabited

Nyeboe Land (Danish: Nyeboes Land) is a peninsula in far northwestern Greenland. It is a part of the Northeast Greenland National Park.

== History ==
Nyeboe Land was named after engineer Marius Nyeboe (1867–1946), chairman of the committee of Knud Rasmussen's Fifth Thule Expedition.

Unlike Hall Land to its west, Nyeboe Land does not have any identified archaeological ruins and seems to have not had permanent settlements.

== Geography ==
Nyeboe Land is located to the northeast of Hall Land in the west, and southwest of Hendrik Island and northwest of Warming Land and the Steensby Glacier in the east. It is bounded to the north by the Lincoln Sea and to the east by Saint George Fjord. Newman Fjord (Newman Bay) marks the western limit of Nyeboe Land. To the south and southeast the peninsula is attached to the mainland and its ice cap. The Dreyer Firn is located in the southwest, near the Saint George Fjord's shore. There are three small bays in the northern shore, Repulse Harbour, Hand Bay and Frankfield Bay, from west to east.

Nyeboe Land is largely unglaciated and mountainous. 1,100 metres (3,609 ft) high Punch Mountain, the highest elevation of the peninsula, is located at the northern end. Other important summits are Korsgård Mountain, Mount Wyatt and Nina Bang Mountain.

Map of part of Ellesmere Island and far Northern Greenland.

== See also ==
- Nyeboe Land Formation
- Sirius Dog Sled Patrol
