= Newman Bay =

Fjord in Greenland

- Newman Fjord; Newman Bugt
- Location in Greenland
- Location: Arctic
- Coordinates: 81°38′N 58°0′W
- Ocean/sea sources: Robeson Channel, Lincoln Sea
- Basin countries: Greenland
- Max. length: 91 km (57 mi)
- Max. width: 6 km (3.7 mi)
- Settlements: Uninhabited

Newman Bay (Danish: Newman Bugt) or Newman Fjord is a fjord in northern Greenland. To the northwest, the fjord opens into the Robeson Channel of the Lincoln Sea. It is a part of the Northeast Greenland National Park.

There are muskoxen near the shores of the fjord.

== History ==
The fjord was named after the Reverend Dr. Newman of Washington, D.C. in September 1871 during the Polaris expedition by Charles Francis Hall. It would be the last place Hall named in Greenland, for he was taken ill shortly thereafter and died in November the same year.

== Geography ==
Newman fjord is roughly SE/NW oriented and opens to the northwest. To the west lies Hall Land with the Polaris Foreland in the shore near its mouth and to the east Nyeboe Land, both largely unglaciated areas. Nina Bang Mountain rises to the east of the fjord and the Haug Range, with Kayser Mountain, to the SW of its shores.

The fjord's mouth is located close to the entrance of the Robeson Channel in the Lincoln Sea, Arctic Ocean; Cape Sumner is the headland on the southwestern side and Cape Brevoort on the northeastern. There are a few small islands in the inner reaches midway between the mouth and its head. Several small streams empty into the fjord, as well as a glacier at its head which discharges from the Greenland Ice Cap.

Map of Northern Ellesmere Island and far Northern Greenland.

== See also ==
- List of fjords of Greenland
