= Robeson Channel =

Waterway between Greenland and Canada

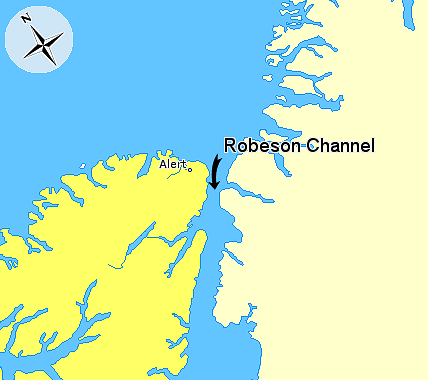
Robeson Channel, Nunavut, Canada. Ellesmere Island, Nunavut Greenland

Robeson Channel (82°00′N 061°30′W) is a body of water lying between Greenland and Canada's northernmost island, Ellesmere Island. It is the most northerly part of Nares Strait, linking Hall Basin to the south with the Arctic Ocean to the north. The Newman Fjord in Greenland has its mouth in the Robeson Channel.

It is about 50 mi (80 km) in length and between 11 and 18 mi (18 and 29 km) wide. Alert, the world's most northerly permanently inhabited settlement, lies nearby.

It was named during the 1871 Polaris Expedition, for American George Robeson, Secretary of the Navy in the Ulysses S. Grant administration.
