= Daugaard-Jensen Land =

Peninsula in northwestern Greenland

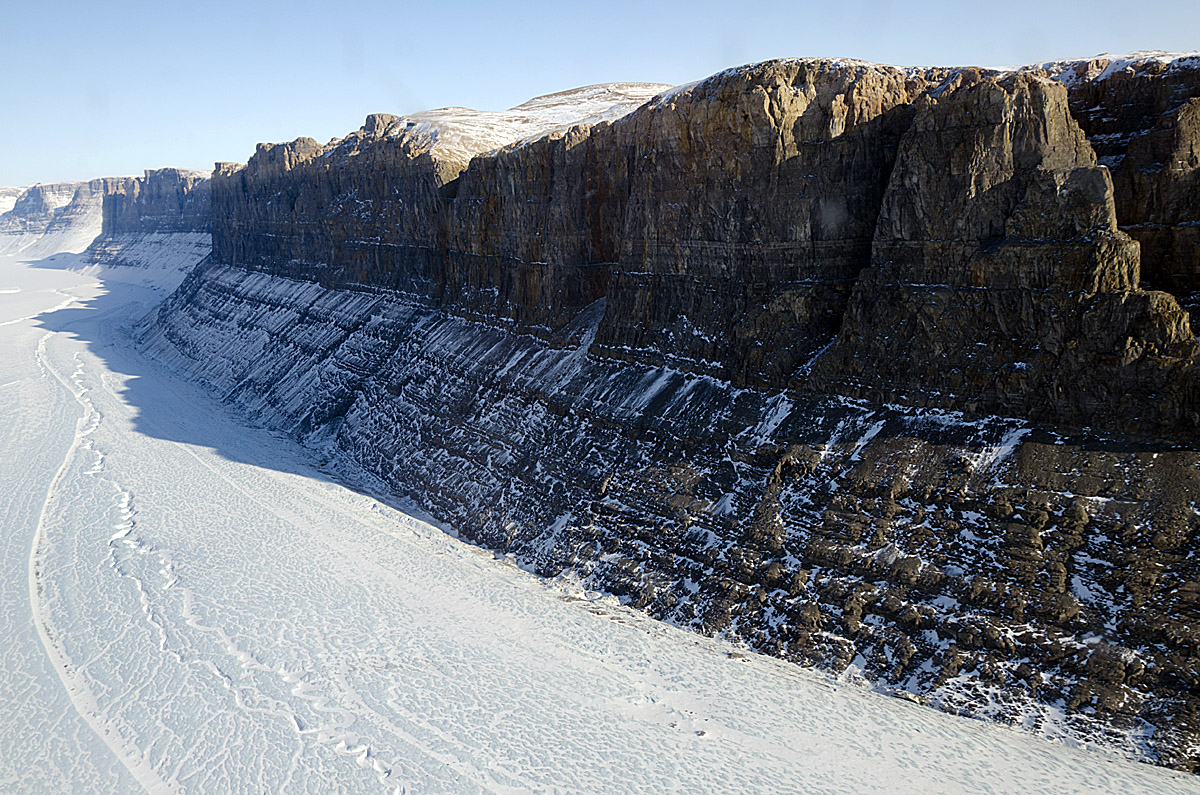
- View of the cliffs flanking Petermann Fjord on the eastern side of Petermann Peninsula, north of Daugaard-Jensen Land.

- Location within Greenland

Geography
- Location: NW Greenland
- Coordinates: 80°19′N 61°30′W
- Adjacent to: Bessel Fjord
- Area: 3,457 km^{2} (1,335 sq mi)
- Length: 100 km (60 mi)
- Width: 50 km (31 mi)
- Highest elevation: 1,047 m (3435 ft)
- Highest point: Unnamed

Administration
- Greenland (Denmark)

Demographics
- Population: Uninhabited

Daugaard-Jensen Land, (Danish: Daugård-Jensen Land), is an unglaciated area in northwestern Greenland. It is a part of the Avannaata municipality.

== History ==
Daugaard-Jensen Land was charted in 1921 by Lauge Koch during the Bicentenary Jubilee Expedition. It was named in honor of Jens Daugaard-Jensen (1871–1938), who served as the Inspector of Greenland from 1912 to 1938.

Unlike Washington Land, Daugaard-Jensen Land did not appear to be permanently inhabited at any time, and no archaeological ruins have been reported inland. Historically, the area was used as a hunting ground for reindeer and muskox, which have now disappeared from Daugaard-Jensen Land.

On February 21, 1947, the Kee Bird made an emergency landing on a frozen lake in Daugaard-Jensen Land. All 11 men on the plane survived and were rescued three days later. It remained preserved until May 21, 1995, when a salvage team attempted to fly the restored aircraft. In the process of taxiing, a fuel tank for the auxiliary power unit leaked and caught fire, burning and destroying the plane. Today, the remnants of the plane are still on the lake.

== Geography ==
Daugaard-Jensen Land is a largely unglaciated 3,457 km² (1,335 sq mi) area located between Washington Land to the west, Petermann Glacier to the east, and the Petermann Peninsula to the north. It is bounded by the Greenland Ice Sheet to the south, beyond which lies the Humboldt Glacier. A chain of long, oblong proglacial lakes, each about 20 km long and 5 km wide, known as the Romer Lakes, are located in the southwestern, southern and southeastern regions between Cape Lyngbæk (in Washington Land) and Cape Schoubye.

Daugaard-Jensen Land is almost entirely landlocked. The only coastline is at the northernmost point at the head of Bessel Fjord, while the western part of the fjord is in Washington Land and the eastern part is part of the Petermann Peninsula, which extends northward into Hall Basin. The southeastern-most point is Cape Schoubye, near the eastern lake of the Romer Lakes, and the northernmost point is Cape Thorsen, south of the Petermann Peninsula and Cecil Glacier.

Washington Land and Daugaard-Jensen Land are commonly grouped together making the “greater Washington Land Group,” since there is no major geographical barrier between them.

Map of part of Ellesmere Island and far Northern Greenland.

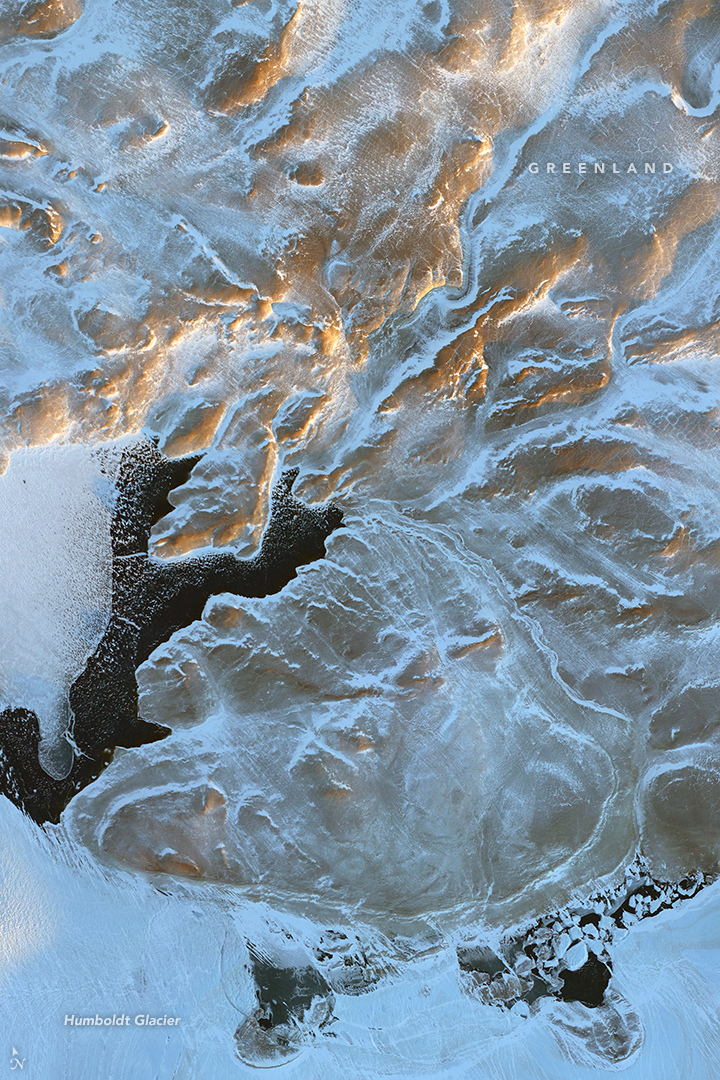
Daugaard-Jensen Land NASA picture.

== Bibliography ==
- H.P. Trettin (ed.), Geology of the Innuitian Orogen and Arctic Platform of Canada and Greenland. Geological Survey of Canada (1991) ISBN 978-0660131313

== See also ==
- Washington Land Group
- Petermann Fjord
