= Sumba Strait =

Strait in Indonesia

- Selat Sumba (Indonesian)
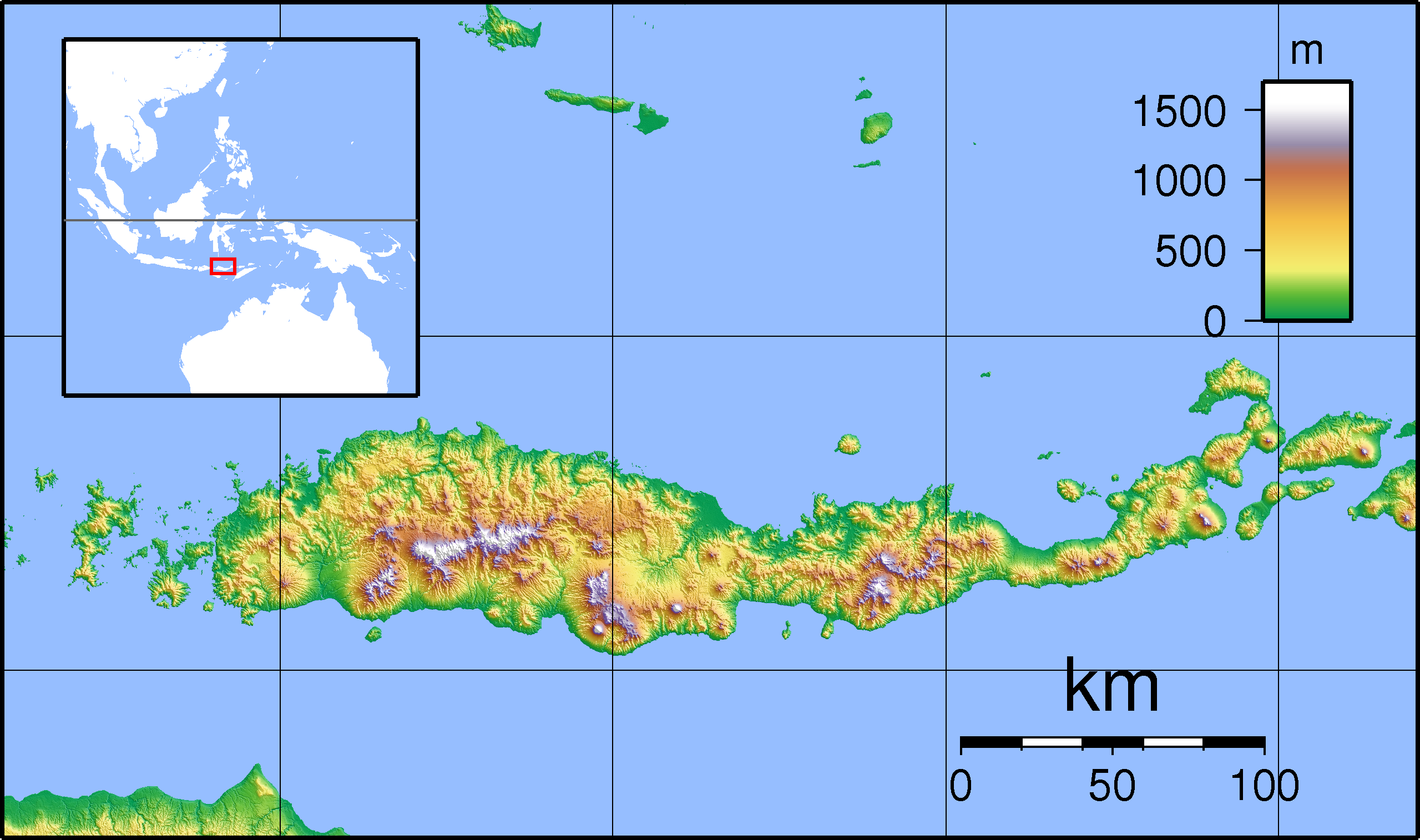
- Flores island and Sumba Strait
- Coordinates: 9.083333°S 120°E
- Type: strait
- Basin countries: Indonesia
- References: Sumba Strait: Indonesia National Geospatial-Intelligence Agency, Bethesda, MD, USA

Sumba Strait (Indonesian: Selat Sumba) is a strait in Indonesia.

It separates the island of Sumba from the major islands of Flores and Sumbawa, as well as minor islands including Komodo and Rinca. It connects the Indian Ocean to the Savu Sea.

Prior to Indonesian independence it was known as Sandalwood Strait. It is also known as the Savu Sea.
