= Hall Basin =

Arctic sea passage between Greenland and Canada

Coordinates: 81°30′N 63°00′W

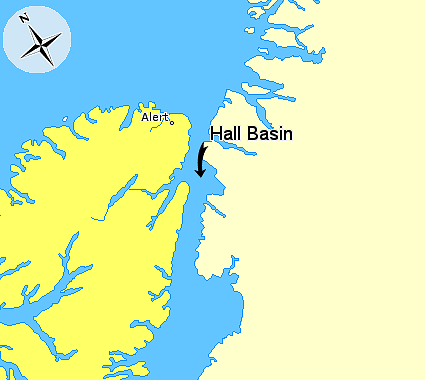
2Hall Basin, Nunavut, Canada. Ellesmere Island, Nunavut Greenland

Hall Basin is an Arctic waterway between Hall Land in Greenland to the east and Canada's northernmost island, Ellesmere Island, to the west.

Hall Basin is named after American polar explorer Charles Francis Hall.

== Geography ==
Hall Basin is located in Nares Strait with its entrance between Cape Baird on the eastern coast of Ellesmere Island and Cape Morton on the northwestern coast of Greenland. Robeson Channel is to the north of the basin, and Kennedy Channel to the south. The basin is irregularly shaped, the entrance to Lady Franklin Bay lies on its western shores, being deeply indented by an extensive fjord system. Although the eastern shore is more regular, it includes the Petermann Fjord of the Petermann Glacier at its southern end.
