= Nares Strait =

Canadian/Danish strait

- Danish: Nares Strædet; French: Détroit de Nares; Greenlandic: Ikeq
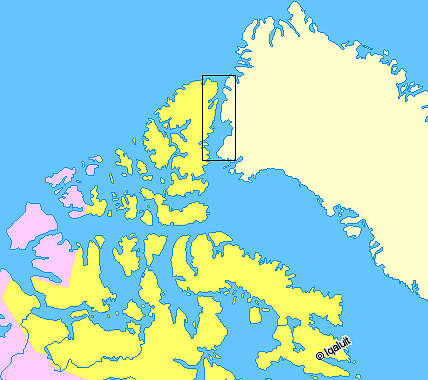
- Nares Strait (boxed) is between Ellesmere Island and Greenland. Northwest Territories, Canada Nunavut, Canada Greenland

- Location within Greenland
- Location: Between Ellesmere Island (Canada) and Greenland
- Coordinates: 80°N 070°W
- Type: Strait
- Etymology: George Nares
- Ocean/sea sources: Atlantic Ocean; Arctic Ocean
- Basin countries: Canada, Greenland
- Max. length: 530 km (330 mi)
- Min. width: 35 km (22 mi)
- Max. depth: 600 metres (2,000 ft)

The Nares Strait (Danish: Nares Strædet; French: Détroit de Nares, Greenlandic: Ikeq) is a waterway between Ellesmere Island and Greenland that connects the northern part of Baffin Bay in the Atlantic Ocean with the Lincoln Sea in the Arctic Ocean. From south to north, the strait includes Smith Sound, Kane Basin, Peabody Bay, Kennedy Channel, Hall Basin and Robeson Channel. Several largely unglaciated landmasses border Nares Strait on the eastern (Greenland) side, including Inglefield Land, Washington Land, Hall Land and Nyeboe Land. Nares Strait has a nearly permanent current from the north, powered by the Beaufort Gyre, making it harder to traverse for ships coming from the south.

Time-lapse imagery from July 9 to Sept. 13 2012 shows an ice island calve from Petermann Glacier and pass through Nares Strait.

In 1964, its name was agreed by the Danish (Stednavneudvalget, now Stednavnenævnet) and Canadian governments. The name derives from the British naval officer George Strong Nares.

The strait and neighbouring waters are usually hazardous for navigation and shipping. Icebergs and pack ice are present year-round; in an extreme example during 1962–64, a 20 km (12 mi) by 10 km (6.2 mi) ice island drifted southward from the Lincoln Sea through the Nares and Davis Straits to the Labrador Sea. During August, however, it is usually navigable by icebreakers. Prior to 1948, only five vessels were recorded as having successfully navigated north of Kane Basin. In 2009 the ship Arctic Sunrise made the first known June transit into the Arctic Ocean.

Hans Island, a tiny island lying within the strait, had been claimed by both Denmark (on behalf of Greenland) and Canada until an agreement on June 14, 2022, settled the dispute by drawing a border across it. Other islands within the strait are Joe Island, Crozier Island, and the much larger Franklin Island.

Thule People reached the Nares Strait in the early 13th century, where they hunted with and traded with Vikings. Archeological remains of Thule Culture and Viking presence are found on Ruin Island.
