= Coalbrookdale Formation =

Fossil-rich deposit in the UK

- Stratigraphic range: Homerian; 430 Ma
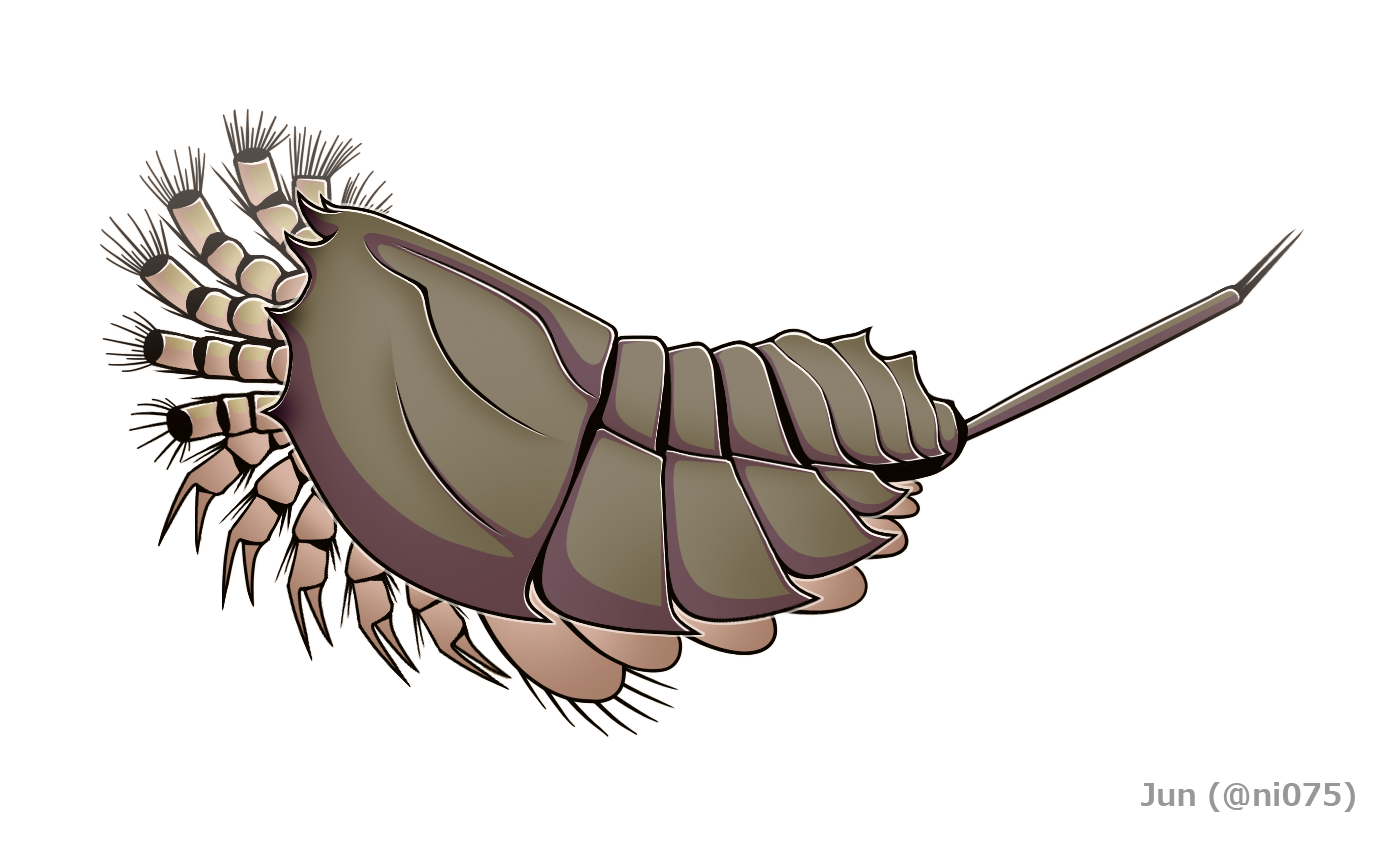
- Reconstruction of Offacolus kingi, the most abundant fossil of Coalbrookdale formation
- Type: Geological formation
- Underlies: Buildwas Formation
- Overlies: Much Wenlock Limestone Formation
- Area: 10,000 km^{2} (3,900 sq mi)
- Thickness: 192–265 m (630–869 ft)

Lithology
- Primary: Mudstone
- Other: Limestone

Location
- Location: England–Wales border
- Coordinates: 52°25′N 3°00′W
- Region: Powys and Herefordshire
- Country: United Kingdom
- Extent: 5.2 miles (8.4 km)

Type section
- Named for: Coalbrookdale
- Coordinates: 52°25′N 3°00′W
- Approximate paleocoordinates: 52°25′N 3°00′W

Coalbrookdale Formation, earlier known as Wenlock Shale or Wenlock Shale Formation and also referred to as Herefordshire Lagerstätte in palaeontology, is a fossil-rich deposit (Konservat-Lagerstätte) in Powys and Herefordshire at the England–Wales border in UK. It belongs to the Wenlock Series of the Silurian Period within the Homerian Age (about 430 million years ago). It is known for its well-preserved fossils of various invertebrate animals many of which are in their three-dimensional structures. Some of the fossils are regarded as earliest evidences and evolutionary origin of some of the major groups of modern animals.

Roderick Murchison first described the geological setting of Coalbrookdale Formation by which he gave the name Silurian in 1935, referring to the Silures, a Celtic tribe of Wales. It is assigned to the Wenlock Group in 1978 based on the age of crustacean fossils found around the region. Robert J. King of the University of Leicester discovered the first unique fossil in 1990. The fossil, an arthropod was reported in 1996 and described in 2000 as Offacolus kingi. Since then, over 30 species of arthropods, polychaete worms, sponges, mollusks, echinoderms, and lobopods have been described; with about 30 species in store yet to be identified.

== History of research ==
Roderick Murchison, at the time vice-president both of the Geological Society and the Geographical Society of London (later Royal Geographical Society), was the first geologist to systematically investigate the Coalbrookdale Formation and the nearby regions including Herefordshire, Shropshire, Brecknockshire, Radnorshire, Monmouthshire, and Carmarthenshire in the early 1830s. In 1835, he named the sedimentary sequences "Silurian" for a Celtic tribe of Wales, the Silures, inspired by his friend Adam Sedgwick, who had named the period of his study the Cambrian, from the Latin name for Wales. The same year, the two men presented a joint paper, under the title "On the Silurian and Cambrian Systems, Exhibiting the Order in which the Older Sedimentary Strata Succeed each other in England and Wales", which became the foundation of the modern geological time scale.

In 1978, John M. Hurst, N. J. Hancock and William Stuart McKerrow determined the geological setting as Wenlock Group based on the distribution of brachiopod fossils collected from the surrounding areas. The rich store of Silurian fossils was first discovered by Robert J. King, a mineralogist and retired Curator in the Department of Geology at the University of Leicester. In 1990, King spent summer vacation in Herefordshire and found tiny nodules in mineral cements (concretions) which he later cracked open to find fossils inside. He returned to the same site and collected nine such concretions, four of which contained fossils. In December 1990, he donated the fossils to the Department of Geology. In 1994, the then curator Roy G. Clements gave the specimens to David J. Siveter for identification. Microscopic examination convinced Siveter that the specimens were unique Silurian fossils. With the help of his twin brother Derek, a Silurian geology expert at the Oxford University Museum of Natural History, he was able to identify an arthropod with well-preserved limbs. Encouraged by such a good finding, the Siveters and King made more systematic investigation in December 1994. The next year they sought assistance from Derek E. G. Briggs at the University of Bristol, an expert in fossil taxonomy, who joined their expedition from 1996.

The research team reported the discovery of the first specimen as a "new arthropod" (along with a trilobite and polychaete worm) in Nature that year:

The small arthropod which dominates the fauna so far discovered is 3–4 mm long. With the evidence presently available, we cannot assign this new arthropod to the trilobites or any living chelicerate or crustacean taxon. It represents an intermediate morphology like those that dominate the Burgess Shale.

With the scientific evidence, they were able to procure research fund from the Natural Environment Research Council (NERC) and the Leverhulme Trust. Patrick Orr and later Mark Sutton were recruited as postdoctoral researchers. Together, they gave the first specimen a name in 2000 as Offacolus kingi, honouring the original discoverer, King; the genus name referring to the eighth-century king of Mercia, Offa.

== Geology ==
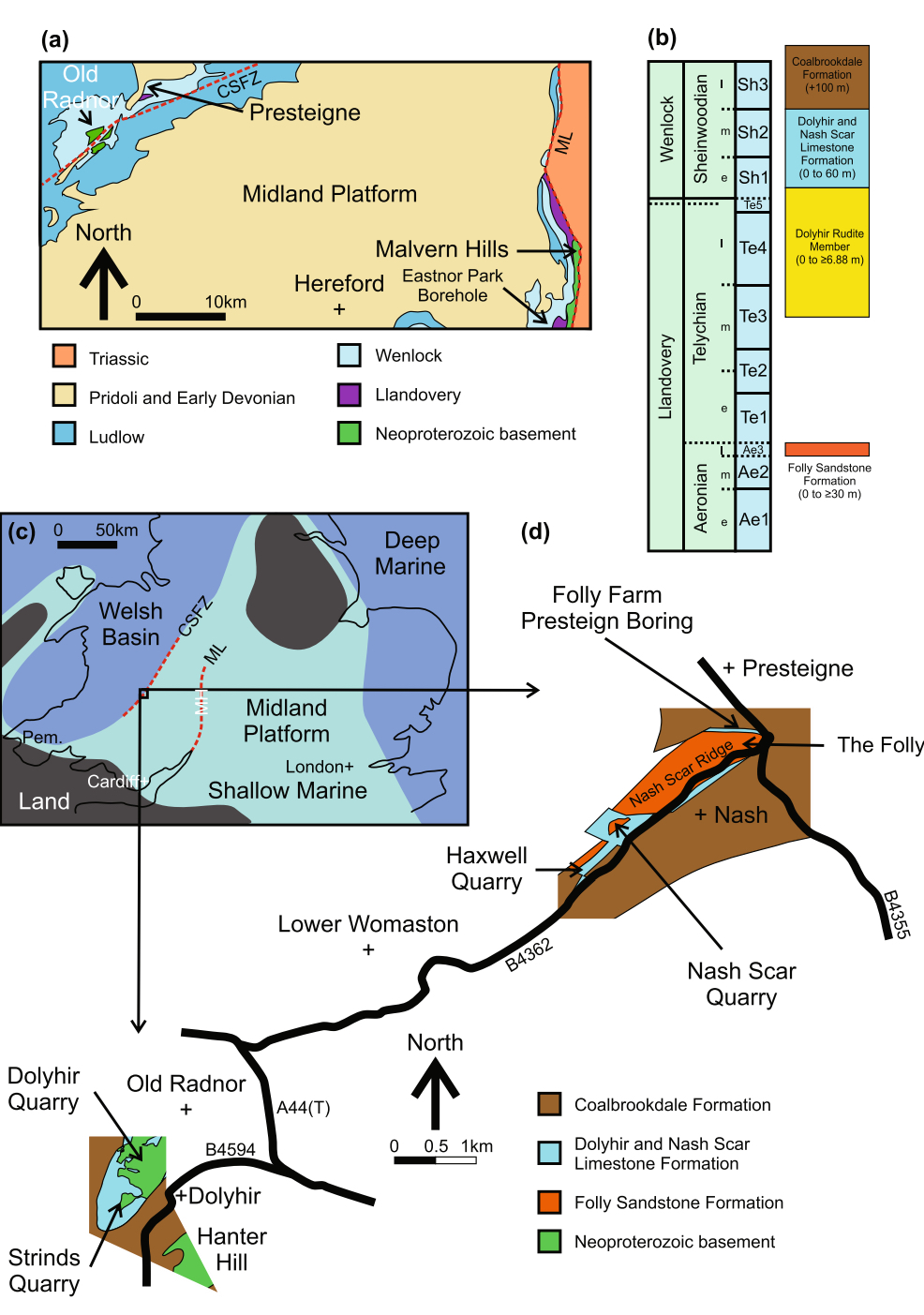
Coalbrookdale Formation map

The Coalbrookdale Formation is located in an area covering the southeastern part of Wales and southwestern part of England, covering the England–Wales border at Powys and Herefordshire, an area between Old Radnor and Presteigne. It lies above the Buildwas Formation and Woolhope Limestone that were deposited during the early Wenlock (Sheinwoodian). It was formed during Homerian under shallow water spreading from the Welsh border eastwards to the Midlands (in Herefordshire). The thickness ranges from 10 m up to 255 m. Above it is the Much Wenlock Limestone Formation.

Fossils are mainly deposited in the upper outer shelf in the Welsh Basin, which was part of the Paleozoic microcontinent Avalonia in the southern subtropics. All major groups of invertebrates are found in three-dimensional and calcite in-fills within concretions in a marine volcaniclastic (bentonite) deposit. The fossils are found in a soft, fine-grained, cream-coloured, weathered and unconsolidated bentonite that appears at about 30 m. The bentonite was deposited within the Wenlock mudstones and rests on the slightly older Dolyhir Formation and Nash Scar Limestone Formation. The bentonite falls at the boundary of the Sheinwoodian and Homerian Ages, about 430 million years old.

The fossils are covered in volcanic ash mixed with the surrounding minerals. The volcanic ash is laid on top of a thin layer of mudstone that enclose a thick layer of limestone. The ash layer is thin and mostly thinner than few centimetres, but up to 1 m at some areas. Some animal fossils indicate that they were trying to run away, indicating live burial. The fossil-containing concretions are small about the size of cherry to grapefruit and are deposited unevenly. The sediment is still soft and can be dug up with barehands.

== Biota and importance ==
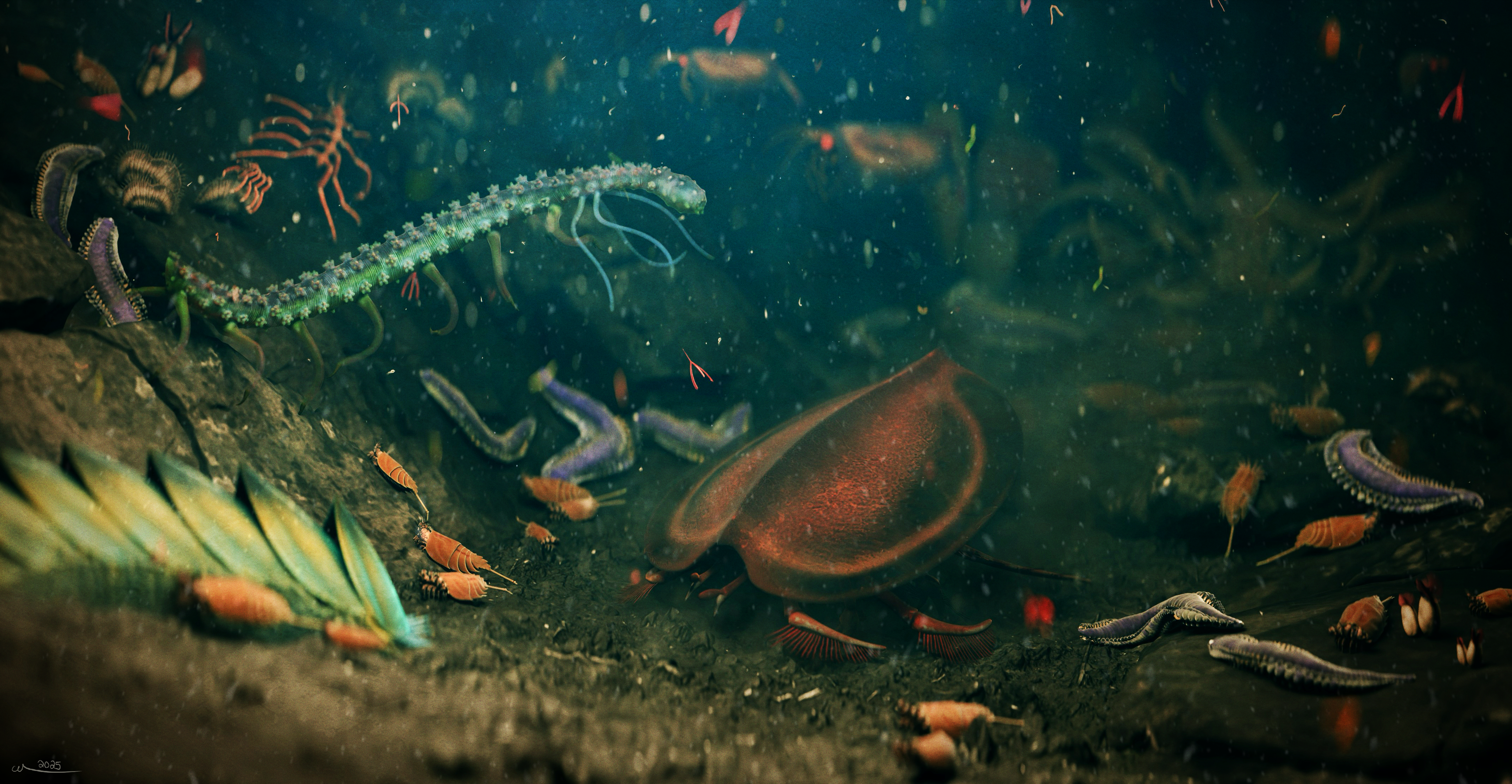
Reconstruction of the Herefordshire Biota

The Coalbrookdale Formation represents one of the best evidences of Silurian life. For this reason, in palaeontology, it is variedly referred to as Herefordshire biota, Herefordshire Nodules, and Herefordshire Lagerstätte. A variety of extinct animals have been recovered and described from it, including arthropods, polychaete worms, sponges, mollusks, echinoderms, lobopods and several unassigned specimens. Over 32 species have been described, and about 30 specimens are waiting for identification. Arthropods are the most diverse with about 20 species; while sponges are most abundant. The uniqueness of the fossil assemblage is that it is not only diverse, but also preserved in three-dimensional structure from which more details of the animal appearances could be deciphered. Table after:

=== Panarthropods ===
Panarthropods
Genus	Notes	Images
Offacolus	A euchelicerate, most common fossil, with over 800 specimens	
Dibasterium	A euchelicerate	
Haliestes	A sea spider	
Xylokorys	An acercostracan marrellomorph	
Pauline	An ostracod	
Nasunaris	An ostracod	
Colymbosathon	An ostracod	
Spiricopia	An ostracod	
Nymphatelina	An ostracod	
Invavita	A pentastomid	
Rhamphoverritor	A thoracic barnacle	
Cinerocaris	A phyllocarid crustacean	
Cascolus	Described as leptostracan phyllocarid, later considered as basal mandibulate	
Enalikter	A worm-like arthropod of uncertain affinities, possibly a megacheiran	
Tanazios	A mandibulate	
Aquilonifer	A stem-group mandibulate	
Dalmanites	A trilobite	
Tapinocalymene	A trilobite	
Carimersa	A vicissicaudatan artiopod	
Thanahita	A lobopodian	

=== Other organisms ===
Other organisms
Genus	Notes	Images
Carduispongia	A sponge	
Bethia	A brachiopod	
Drakozoon	A soft-shelled brachiopod	
Acaenoplax	A stem-group aplacophoran mollusc	
Emo	A stem-group aplacophoran mollusc	
Kulindroplax	A stem-group aplacophoran mollusc	
Punk	An aplacophoran mollusc	
Praectenodonta	A bivalve	
Platyceras?	A gastropod	
Nautiloidea	Uninvestigated	
Kenostrychus	An annelid	
Bdellacoma	An asterozoan echinoderm	
Heropyrgus	An edrioasteroid echinoderm	
Protaster	A stem-group ophiuroid	
Crinoidea	Uninvestigated	
Sollasina	An ophiocistioid echinoderm	
Pterobranchia	Uninvestigated	
"Graptoloids"	Uninvestigated	
Inanihella	A radiolarian	
Haplentactinia	A radiolarian	
Parasecuicollacta	A radiolarian	
"Mazuelloids"	A type of acritarch	
