= Schuchert =

Schuchert can refer to:

- Charles Schuchert (1858–1942), US invertebrate paleontologist
  - Charles Schuchert Award, award named in honor of the above, given by the Paleontological Society
- Peter Schuchert, marine biologist and founder of the World Hydrozoa Database
- Cape Schuchert Formation, a Silurian rock formation in Greenland
- Schuchert Dal Formation, a Permian rock formation in Greenland
