= Tick Wood And Benthall Edge =

Protected area in Shropshire, England

Coordinates: 52°37′39″N 2°30′0″W

Tick Wood and Benthall Edge is a Site of Special Scientific Interest (SSSI) in Shropshire, England. This protected area is located on the opposite side of the River Severn from Ironbridge and extends west towards the village of Wyke. This extent of woodland is protected because of the diversity of plant species that reflects some of the variation in underlying geology.

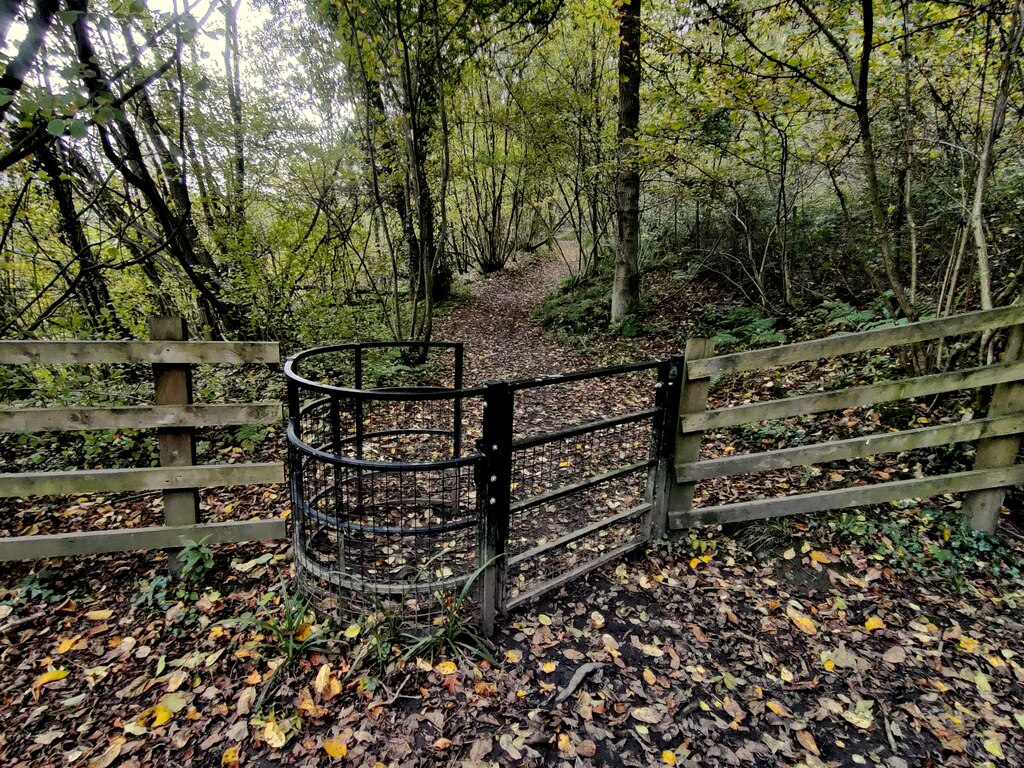
Gate along the Shropshire Way

There has been a history of mining on Benthall Edge and historically there were tramways here used to carry extracted limestone.

== Geology ==
The rocks underlying Tick Wood and Benthall Edge include Wenlock limestone and Wenlock shale from the Silurian period as well as clays and sandstones of the Coal measures.

== Biology ==
On Coal measures, the tree species include sessile oak and birch, the understorey includes bilberry and fern species include hard fern. On Wenlock Limestone and Wenlock Shale, the tree species include ash, wych elm, hazel and small-leaved lime. Herb species include sanicle, sweet woodruff and dog's mercury. Plants in wooded parts of this protected area also include toothwort and violet helleborine.

There are areas of grassland where plant species include dyer's greenweed, salad burnet, burnet saxifrage, greater knapweed, marjoram and pyramidal orchid.

== Land ownership ==
A small section of the land within Tick Wood and Benthall Edge SSSI is owned by the National Trust because this protected area crosses the Benthall Hall Estate. When the SSSI was designated, Benthall Edge Wood was owned by the Telford Development Corporation.

Severn Gorge Countryside Trust has a management role in this protected area.
