= Wenlock Group =

Middle series of strata in the Silurian (Upper Silurian) of Great Britain

The Wenlock Group (Wenlockian), in geology, is the middle series of strata in the Silurian (Upper Silurian) of Great Britain. This group in the typical area in the Welsh border counties contains the following formations: Much Wenlock Limestone Formation, 90–300 ft.; Wenlock Shale, up to 1900 ft.; Woolhope or Barr Limestone and shale, 150 ft.

== Stratigraphy ==
=== Woolhope Beds ===
The Woolhope Beds consist mainly of shales which are generally calcareous and pass frequently into irregular nodular and lenticular limestone. In the Malvern Hills there is much shale at the base, and in places the limestone may be absent. These beds are best developed in Herefordshire; they appear also at May Hill in Gloucestershire and in Radnorshire. Common fossils are Phacops caudatus, Encrinurus tuberculatus, Orthis calligramma, Atrypa reticularis, and Orthoceras annulatum.

=== Wenlock Shales ===
The Wenlock Shales are pale or dark-grey shales which extend through Coalbrookdale in Shropshire, through Radnorshire into Carmarthenshire. They appear again southward in the Silurian patches in Gloucestershire, Herefordshire and Monmouthshire. They thicken from the south northward. The fossils are on the whole closely similar to those in the limestones above with the natural difference that corals are comparatively rare in the shales, while graptolites are abundant. Six graptolite zones were recognized by Gertrude Elles in this formation.

=== Wenlock Limestone ===
The Wenlock Limestone occurs either as a series of thin limestones within shales or as thick massive beds; it is sometimes hard and crystalline and sometimes soft, earthy or concretionary. It is typically developed at Wenlock Edge, where it forms a striking feature for some 20 mi. It appears very well exposed in a sharp anticline at Dudley, whence it is sometimes called the Dudley Limestone; it occurs also at Aymestrey, Ludlow, Woolhope, May Hill, Usk and Malvern.

The fossils include corals in great variety (Halysites catenularis, Favosites aspera, Heliolites interstinctus), crinoids (Crotalocrinus, Marsupiocrinus, Periechocrinus), often very beautiful specimens, and trilobites (Calymene blumenbachii, the Dudley locust, Phacops caudatus and Illaenus (Bumastus) barriensis). Brachiopods are abundant (Atrypa reticularis, Spirifer plicatilis, Rhynchonella cuneata, Orthis, Leptaena, Pentamerus). Lamellibranchs include the genera Avicula, Cardiola and Grammysia whilst Murchisonia, Bellerophon and Omphalotrochus are common gastropod genera. Common cephalopod genera include Orthoceras, Phragmoceras and Trochoceras.

== Silurian fauna ==
The greater part of the known Silurian fauna of Britain comes from Wenlock rocks; J. Davidson and G. Maw obtained no fewer than 25,000 specimens of brachiopods from seven tons of the shale. Not only are there many different genera and species but individually certain forms are very numerous. The three principal zonal graptolites are, from above downwards: Monograptus testis, Cyrtograptus linnarssoni, and Cyrtogra murchisoni.

== Other areas ==
When traced northward into Denbighshire and Merionethshire, the Wenlock-age rocks change their character and become more slaty or arenaceous. They are represented in this area by the Moel Ferna Slates, the Pen-y-glog Grit, and Pen-y-glog Slates. All of those layers belong to the lower part of the Denbighshire Grits, a great series of slates and grits 3,000 feet (910 m) thick.

Similar deposits of similar age occur on this horizon still farther north. In the Lake District, the Wenlock rocks are represented by the Brathay Flags, the lower part of the Coniston Flags series. In southern Scotland, their place is taken by the variable Riccarton Beds of Kirkcudbright shore, Dumfriesshire, Riccarton, and the Cheviots. In Lanarkshire, they are represented by sandstone in the form of greywackes and by shales. In the Pentland Hills, one finds mudstones, shales, and grits. In the Girvan area are the Blair and Straiton Beds.

In Ireland, there is more rock of Wenlock age. In the Dingle Peninsula one finds the Ferriters Cove Beds, a thick series of shales, slates, and sandstones with lavas and tuffs. In County Tipperary and County Mayo are the Mweelrea Beds and others.

== Economic geology ==
Lime and flagstones are the most important economic products of the British Wenlock rocks.
