= Ella Island Formation =

Geologic formation in Greenland

- Stratigraphic range: Cambrian Series 2-Miaolingian (Botomian-Dyeran); ~516–513 Ma
- Type: Formation
- Underlies: Hyolithus Creek & Dolomite Point Formations
- Overlies: Bastion Formation

Lithology
- Primary: Limestone
- Other: Sandstone, shale

Location
- Coordinates: 74.1°N 23.0°W
- Approximate paleocoordinates: 30.8°S 48.9°W
- Country: Greenland

Type section
- Named for: Ella Island
- Ella Island Formation (Greenland)

The Ella Island Formation is a geologic formation in Greenland. It preserves fossils dated to the Cambrian period.

== See also ==
- List of fossiliferous stratigraphic units in Greenland
- Buen Formation
