= Scoresby Land Group =

Geologic formation in Greenland

- Stratigraphic range: Triassic
- Type: Group
- Sub-units: Wordie Creek Formation, Pingo dal Formation, Gipsdalen Formation, Fleming Fjord Formation
- Underlies: Kap Stewart Group
- Overlies: Schuchert Dal Formation, Foldvik Creek Group

Location
- Country: Greenland

The Scoresby Land Group is a geologic group found in the Jameson Land Basin, Scoresby Land, East Greenland. It preserves fossils dating back to the Triassic period. It comprises the Wordie Creek Formation (Lower Triassic), Pingo Dal Formation (?Lower Triassic), Gipsdalen Formation (Middle to Upper Triassic) and the Fleming Fjord Formation (Upper Triassic). It is underlain by Upper Permian beds of the Schuchert Dal Formation and overlain by Rhaetian beds of the Kap Stewart Group.

== See also ==
- List of fossiliferous stratigraphic units in Greenland
