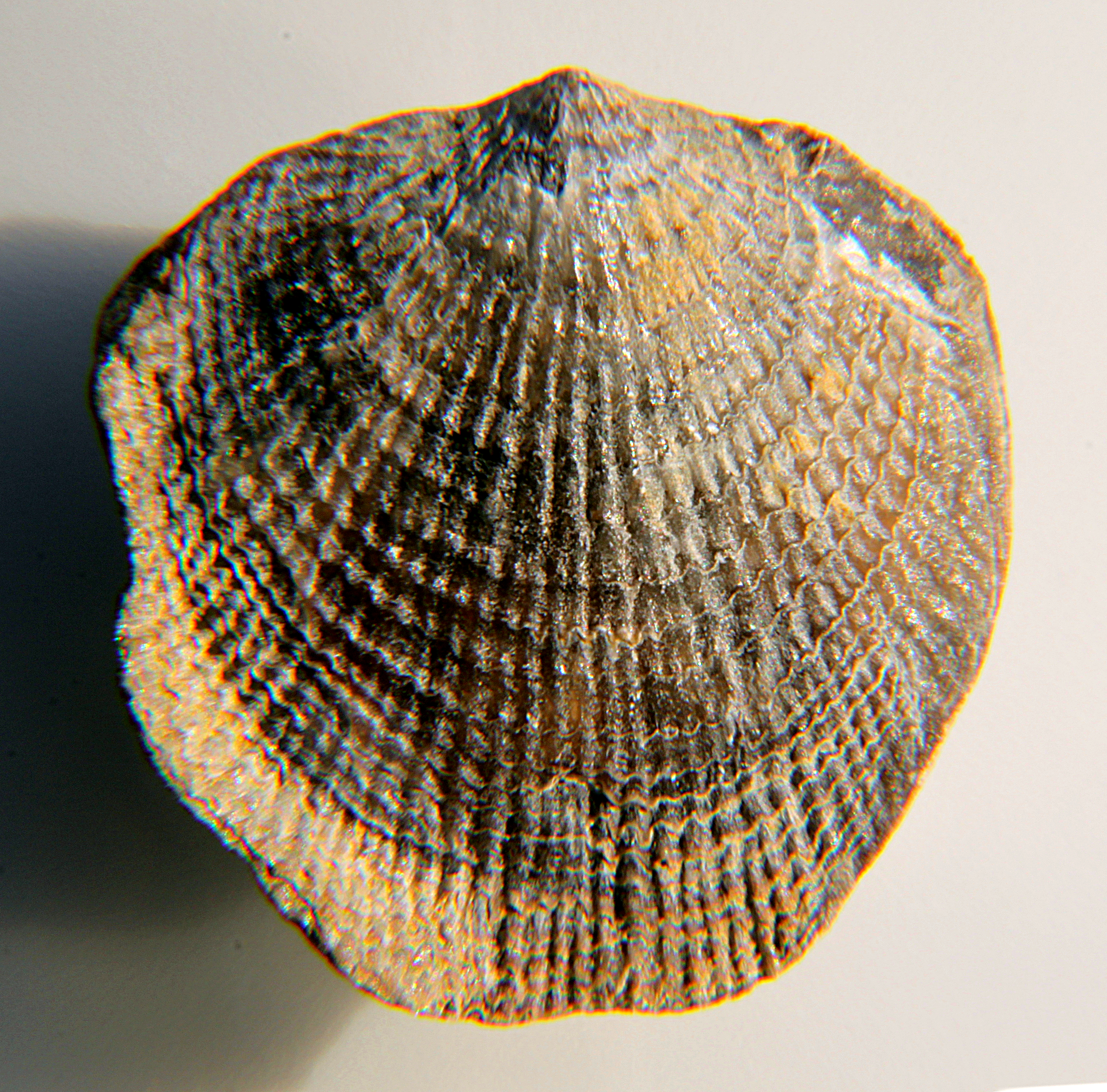
- Atrypa reticularis, 26mm, Eifel, Germany

Scientific classification
- Kingdom: Animalia
- Phylum: Brachiopoda
- Class: Rhynchonellata
- Order: †Atrypida
- Family: †Atrypidae
- Subfamily: †Atrypinae
- Genus: †Atrypa; Dalman, 1828

Species
- A. reticularis Linnaeus, 1758 (type) = Anemia reticularis, A. dzwinogrodensis; A. devoniana Webster, 1921; A. jukesii; A. nevadana; A. oklahomensis; A. oneidensis; A. putilla

Synonyms
- Cleiothyris Phillips, 1841, Mikrothyris

= Atrypa =

Atrypa Temporal range: Late Ordovician-Carboniferous ~449–336 Ma

Genus of brachiopod

Atrypa is a genus of brachiopod with round to short egg-shaped shells covered with many fine radial ridges (or costae). Growth lines form perpendicular to the costae and are spaced approximately 2 to 3 times further apart than the costae.. The pedunculate valve is slightly convex, but oftentimes levels out or becomes slightly concave toward the anterior margin (opposite the hinge and pedicle). The brachial valve is highly convex. Neither valve contains an interarea (a flat area bordering the hinge line, approximately perpendicular with the rest of the valve). Atrypa had a large geographic range and occurred from the late Lower Silurian (Telychian) to the early Upper Devonian (Frasnian). Other sources expand the range from the Late Ordovician to Carboniferous, approximately from 449 to 336 Ma. A proposed new species, A. harrisi, was found in the trilobite-rich Floresta Formation in Boyacá, Colombia.

== Reassigned species ==
As Atrypa was established in the 18th century, many species have since been reassigned.

- A. arata = Pentamerella arata
- A. aspera var. occidentalis = Spinatrypa occidentalis
- A. astuta = Felinotoechia astuta
- A. congregata = Camarotoechia congregata
- A. coralifera = Eodictyonella coralifera
- A. depressa = Plagiorhyncha glassii
- A. dubia = Protorhyncha dubia
- A. elongata = Rensselaeria elongata
- A. exigua = Protozyga exigua
- A. extans = Triplesia extans
- A. flabellites = Leptocoelia propria
- A. gruenwaldtiaeformis = Nalivkinia gruenwaldtiaeformis
- A. hemiplicata = Parastrophina hemiplicata
- A. hemisphaerica = Eocoelia hemisphaerica
- A. hircina = Hircinisca hircina
- A. hirsuta = Parazyga hirsuta
- A. hystrix var. occidentalis = Spinatrypa occidentalis
- A. increbescens = Rhynchotrema increbescens
- A. kolymensis = Vagrania kolymensis
- A. laevis = Meristella laevis
- A. lens = Stricklandia lens
- A. linguifera = Antirhynchonella linguifera
- A. medialis = Eatonia medialis
- A. modesta = Zygospira modesta
- A. nitens = Hisingerella nitens
- A. nitida = Whitfieldella nitida
- A. nucella = Lycophoria nucella
- A. obovata = Glassia obovata
- A. obtusiplicata = Pectorhyncha obtusiplicata
- A. peculiaris = Costellirostra peculiaris
- A. plebeia = Dicamara plebeia
- A. pleiopleura = Pleiopleurina pleiopleura
- A. prunum = Atrypella prunum
- A. recurvirostra = Zygospira recurvirostra
- A. scitula = Charionella scitula
- A. sordida = Cyclocoelia sordida
- A. tumida = Meristina tumida
- A. unisulcata = Pentagonia peersii

== Organic content of Atrypa fossils ==
Organic compounds may be preserved in some Atrypa fossils. However, only the more stable amino acids tend to be preserved in older Atrypa fossils. In specimens of Atrypa reticularis from the Wenlock Shales (Lower Silurian), alanine, glycine, glutamic acid, leucine, isoleucine, proline, valine, and aspartic acid have been found.

== Gallery ==
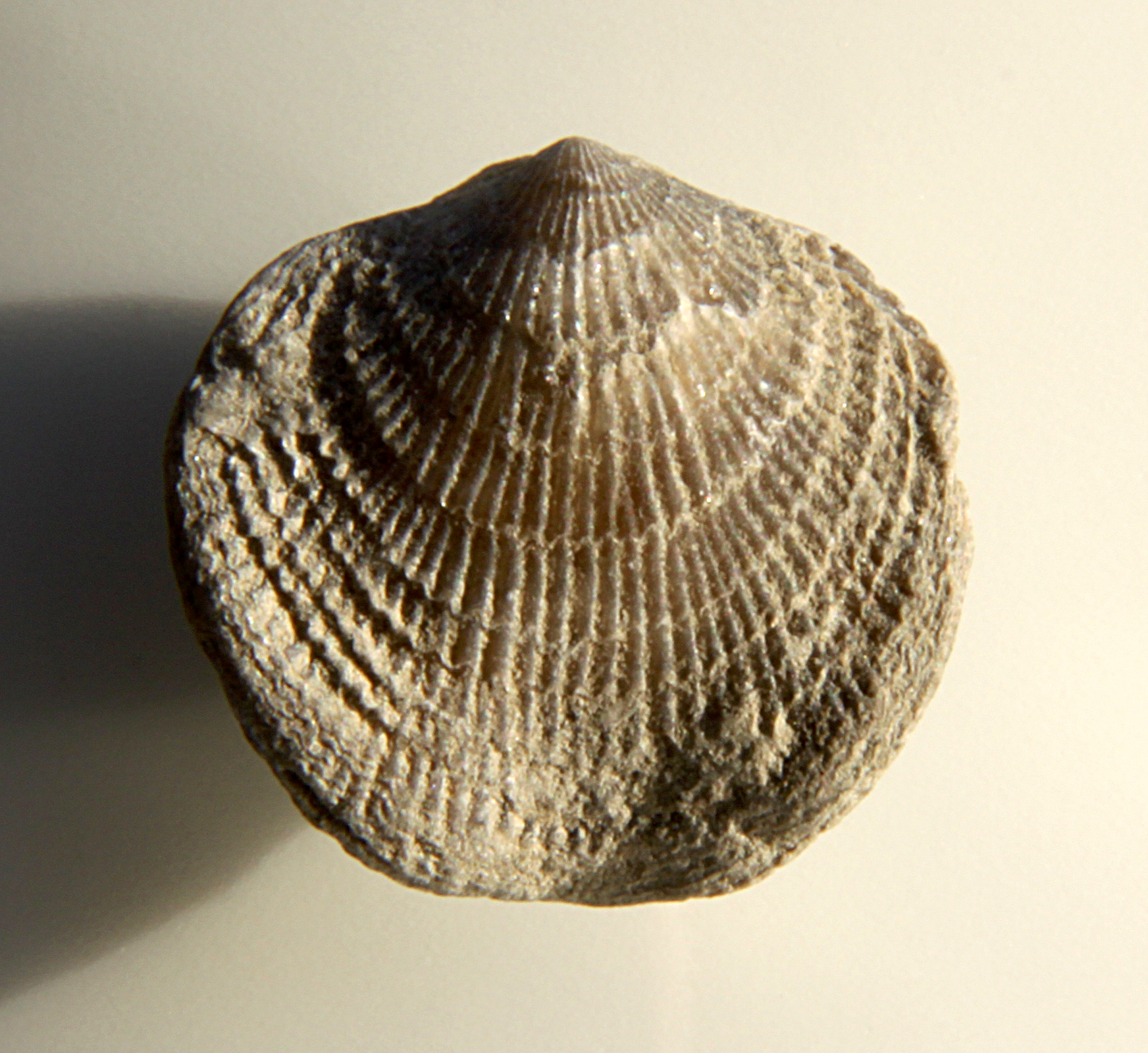
Atrypa devoniana, pedicle valve

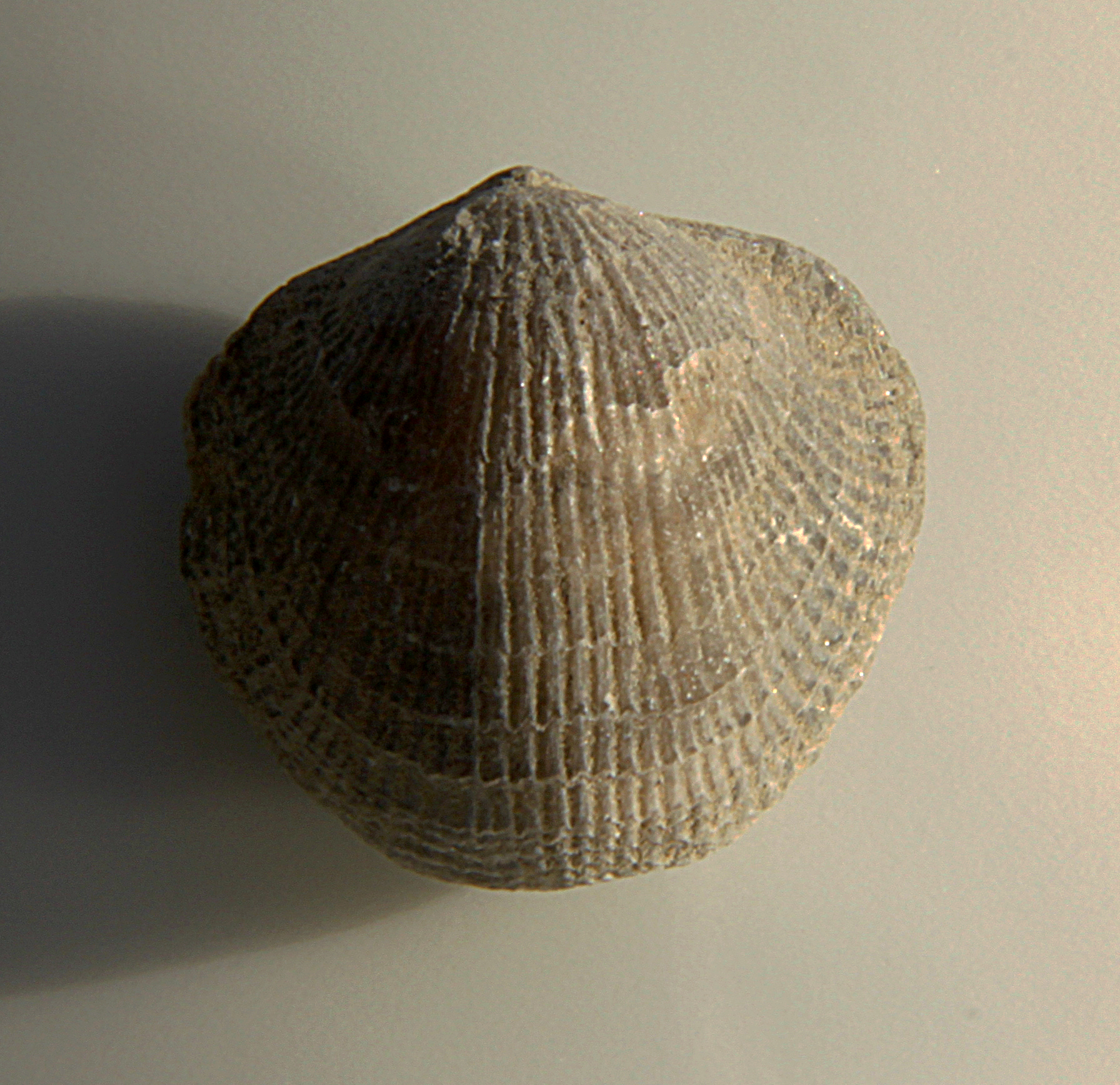
Atrypa devoniana, brachial valve

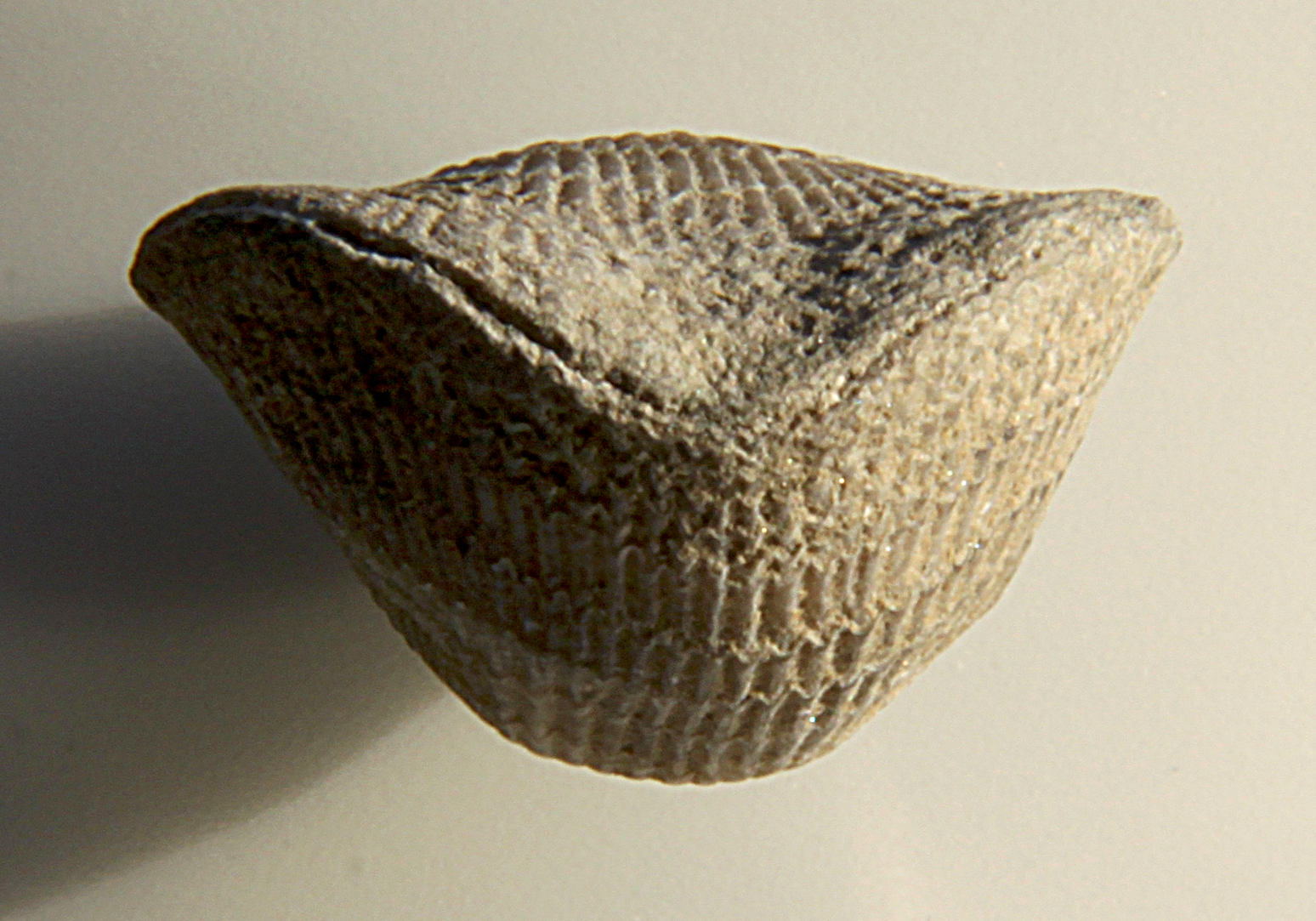
Atrypa devoniana, anterior view

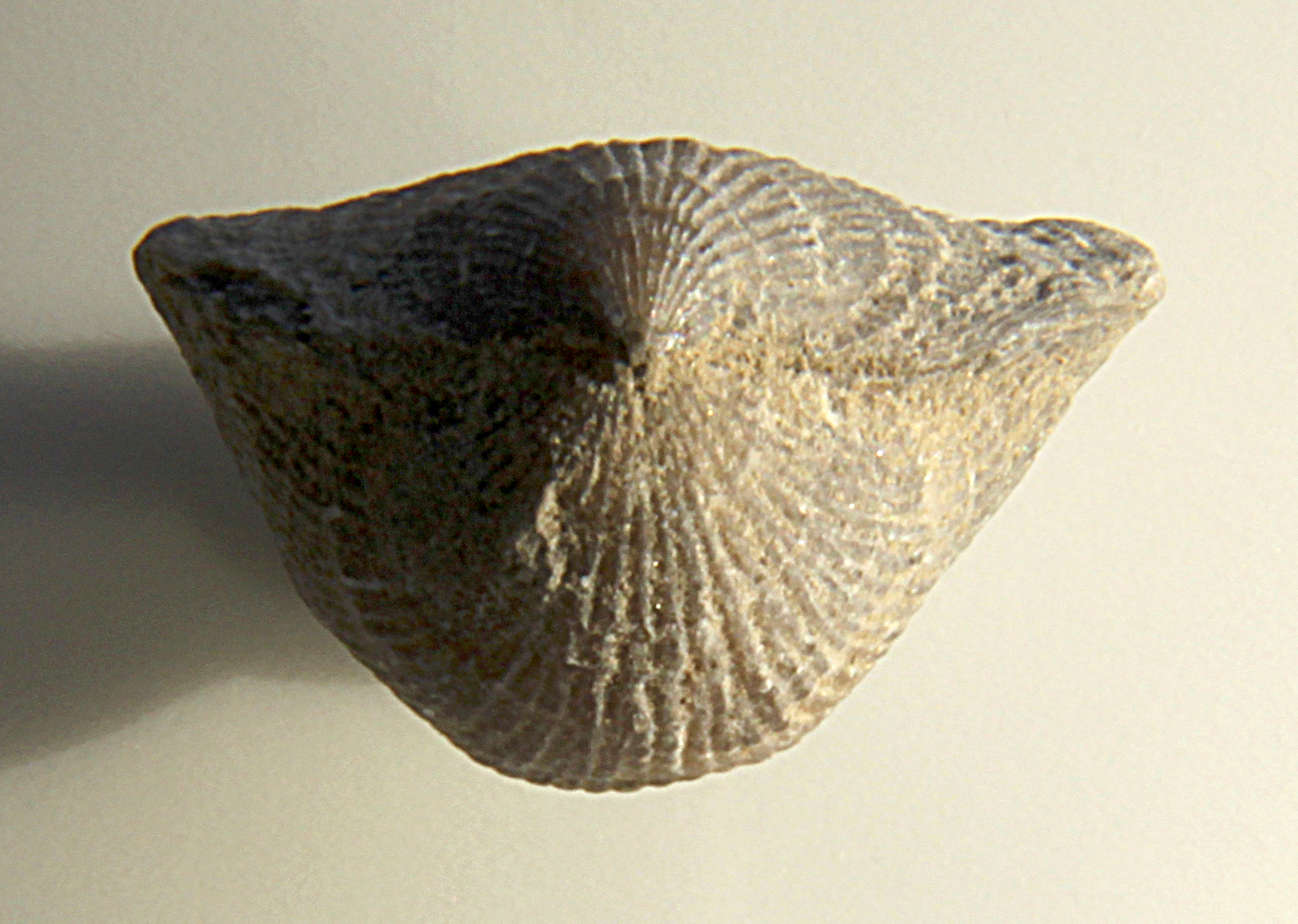
Atrypa devoniana, posterior view

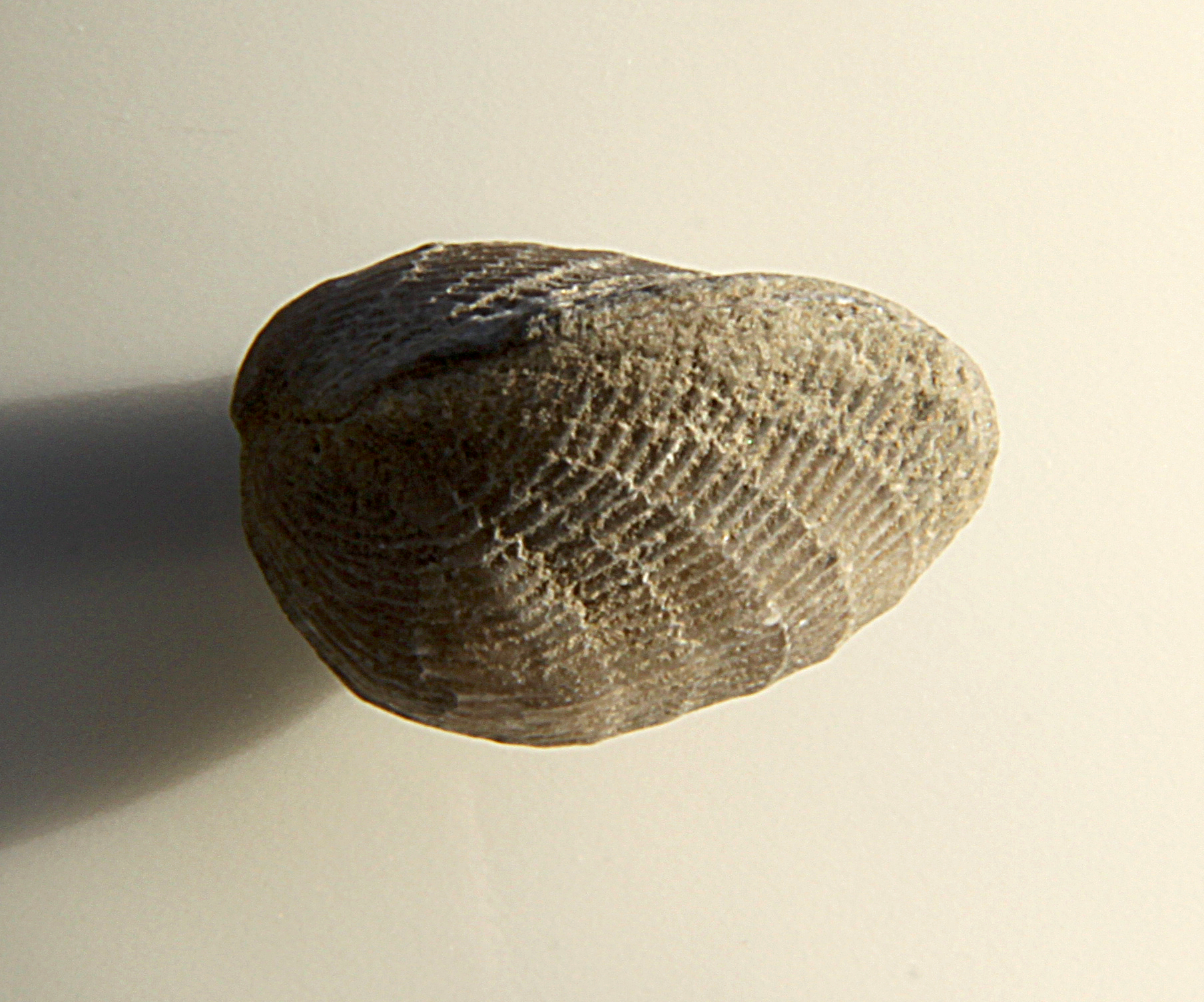
Atrypa devoniana, lateral view

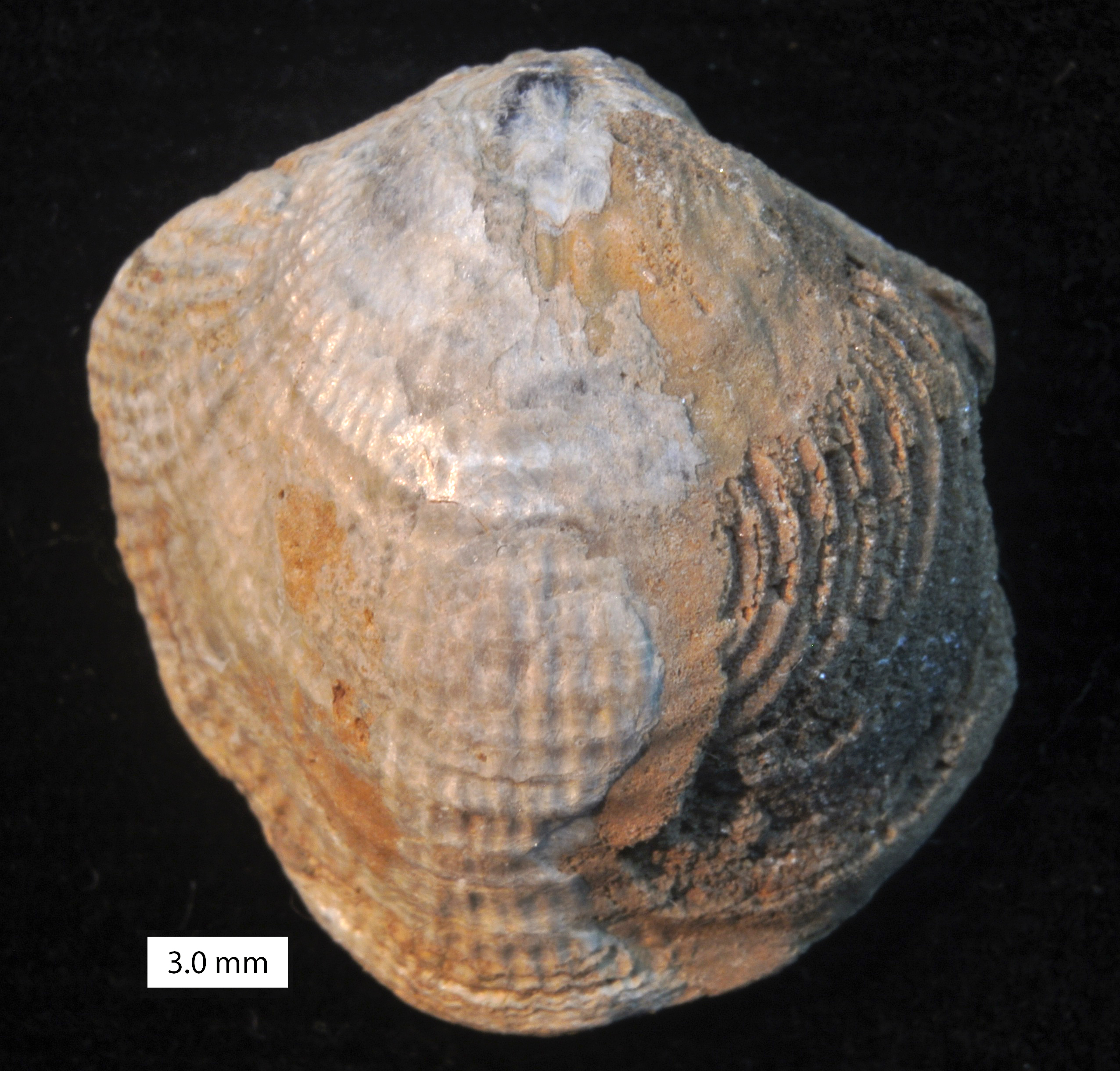
Atrypa sp.; Couvinian (Middle Devonian); El Pical, Leon, Spain. Eroded to show spiralia on the right.
