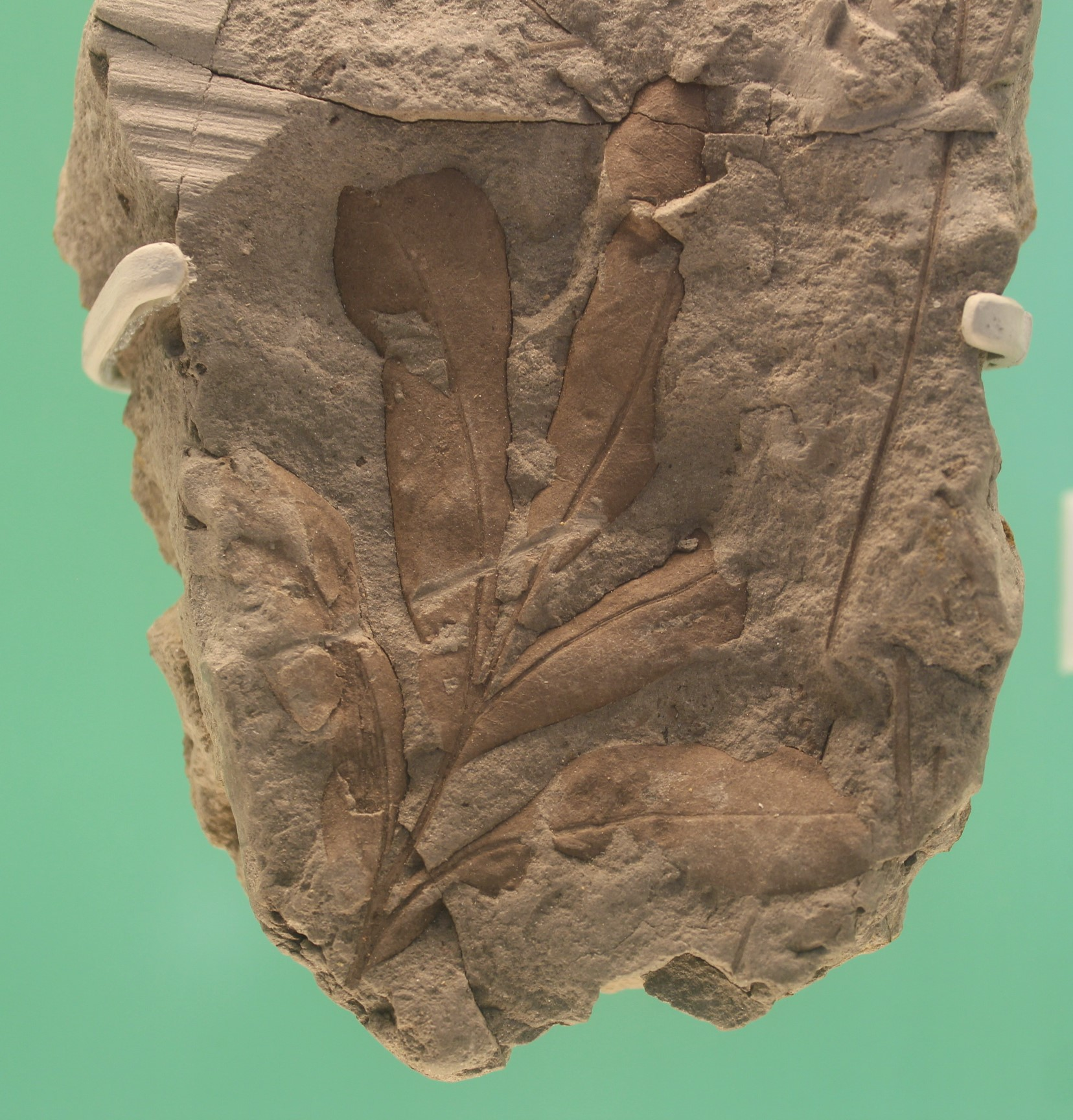
- Sapindopsis fossil, National Museum of Natural History

Scientific classification
- Kingdom: Plantae
- Clade: Tracheophytes
- Clade: Angiosperms
- Clade: Eudicots
- Order: Proteales
- Family: Platanaceae
- Genus: †Sapindopsis (Fontaine) Dilcher and Basson 1990

Type species
- †Sapindopsis magnifolia Fontaine, 1889

Species
- See text

= Sapindopsis =

Sapindopsis Temporal range: Early Cretaceous–Late Cretaceous

Extinct genus of leaf fossils

Sapindopsis ("Sapindus-like") is an extinct form genus for leaves of the Cretaceous Period, originally considered similar to soapberry. Associated reproductive structures now suggest it was more closely related to planes and sycamores of the family Platanaceae.

== Description ==
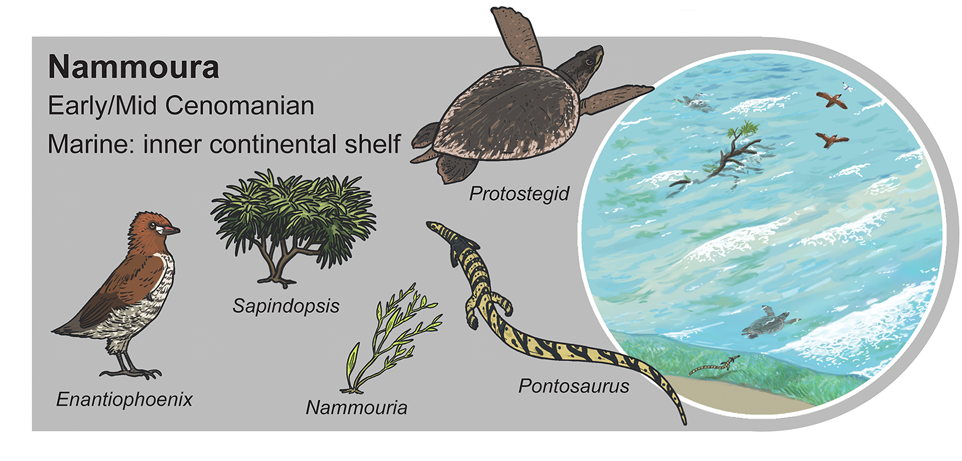
Flora, fauna and depositional environment of the Nammoura locality, including Sapindopsis

In the form generic system of paleobotany Sapindopsis is used only for leaves, which are compound with three to six leaflets. Leaflets vary in distinctness or confluence with the midrib. The venation is pinnate, eucamptodromous to brochidodromus, with percurrent tertiary veins.

== Distribution and species ==
Sapindopsis was geographically widespread from Asia to North America. Species include:

- Sapindopsis acuta (Heer) Budantsev, 1983 - Albian–Coniacian; Atane Formation; Isunguak & Asuk, Greenland
- Sapindopsis angusta (Heer) Seward & Conway, 1935 - Albian–Coniacian; Atane Formation; Isunguak & Asuk, Greenland
- Sapindopsis anhouryi Dilcher & Basson 1990 - Cenomanian; Sannine Formation; Namoura, Lebanon.
- Sapindopsis asiaticus Golovneva & Sun 2022 - Late Albian - Early Turonian; Krivorechenskaya Formation; Russia.
- Sapindopsis brevifolia Fontaine, 1889 - Barremian, Potomac Group, Virginia, USA
- Sapindopsis chinensis Golovneva & Sun 2022 - Late Albian Dalazi Formation; China & Alchan Formation; Russia
- Sapindopsis magnifolia (Fontaine) Dilcher & Basson 1990 (type) Barremian, Potomac Group, Virginia, USA
- Sapindopsis orientalis Golovneva & Sun 2022 - Frentsevka Formation of Russia.
- Sapindopsis powelliana (Lesquereux) Wang & Dilcher 2018 - Cenomanian; Dakota Formation; Kansas, USA.
  - Distefananthus hoisingtonensis (Huegele & Wang, 2022) may be the inflorescence of this species.
- Sapindopsis retallackii Wang & Dilcher 2018 - Cenomanian Dakota Formation; Kansas, USA
- Sapindopsis variabilis Fontaine 1889 - Barremian Patapsco Formation; Virginia, USA
