= Pentamerus Bjerge Formation =

Geologic formation in Greenland

- Stratigraphic range: Silurian
- Type: Formation

Location
- Country: Greenland

Type section
- Named for: Pentamerus Range

The Pentamerus Bjerge Formation is a geologic formation part of the Peary Land Group in Greenland. It preserves fossils dating back to the Silurian period.

The formation is named after the Pentamerus Range (Pentamerus Bjerge) in Washington Land, NW Greenland.

== See also ==
- List of fossiliferous stratigraphic units in Greenland
