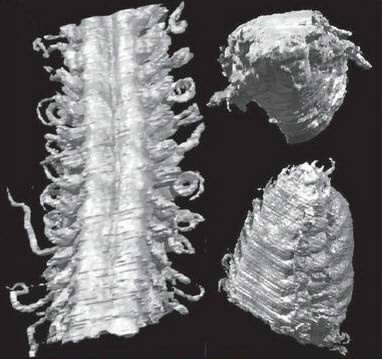

Scientific classification
- Kingdom: Animalia
- Phylum: Annelida
- Class: Polychaeta
- Genus: †Kenostrychus; Sutton et al., 2001
- Species: †K. clementsi

Binomial name
- †Kenostrychus clementsi Sutton et al., 2001

= Kenostrychus =

Kenostrychus Temporal range: Homerian

Extinct genus of annelid worms

Kenostrychus is a monospecific genus of polychaete worms known from exceptional 3D fossils from the Silurian aged Herefordshire lagerstatte of England. With 250 specimens known as of 2019, it is the most abundant non-arthropod fossil there.

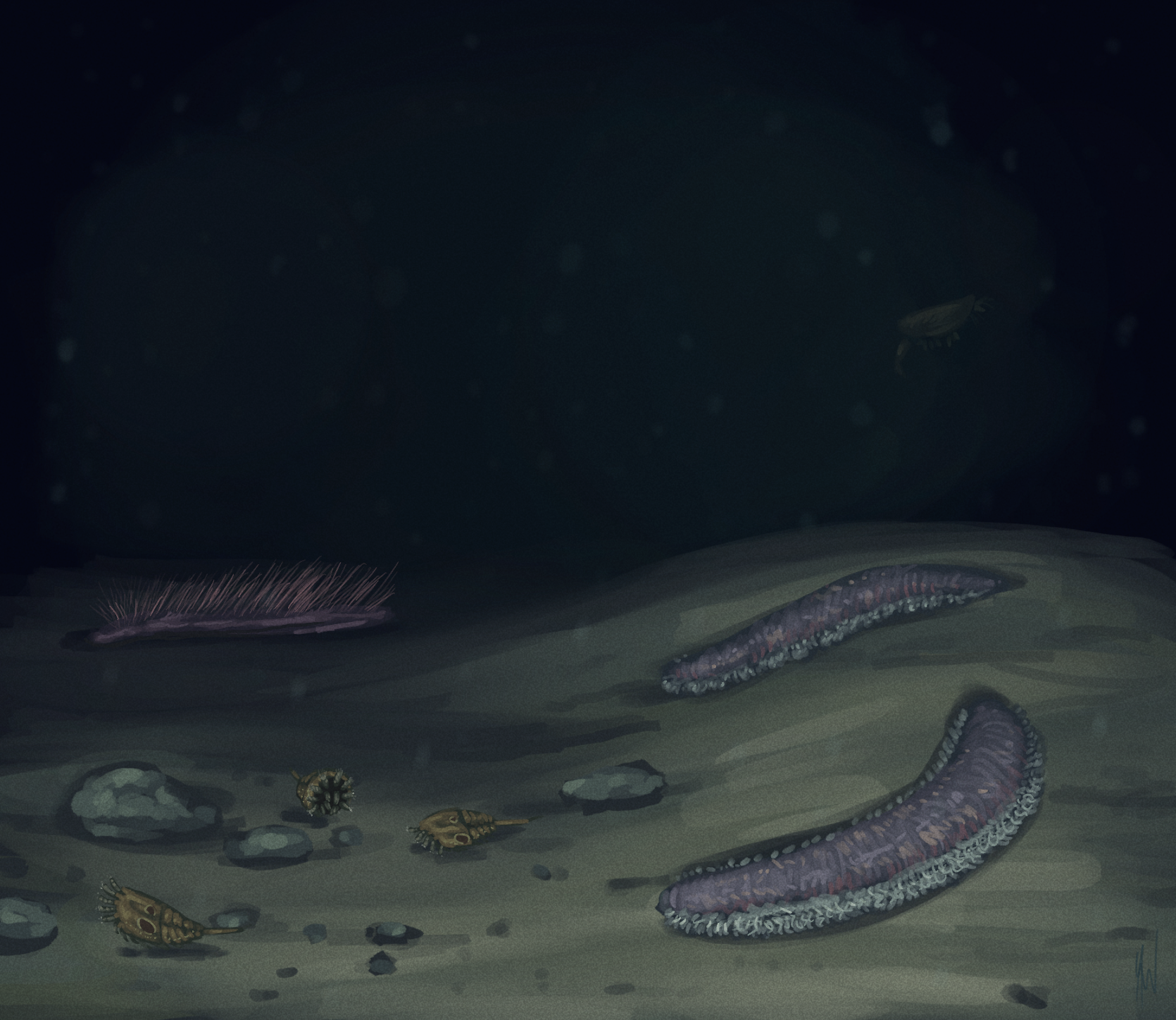
A reconstruction Keostrychus and other animals from the Coalbrookdale Formation
