= Peary Land Group =

Geologic formation in Greenland

- Stratigraphic range: Silurian
- Type: Group
- Sub-units: (see text)

Location
- Country: Greenland

The Peary Land Group is a geologic group in Greenland. It preserves fossils dating back to the Silurian period.

== Formations ==
The following formations are included in the Peary Land Group:

- Adams Bjerg Formation
- Cape Schuchert Formation
- Pentamerus Bjerge Formation
- Lafayette Bugt Formation
- Hauge Bjerge Formation
- Lauge Koch Land Formation
- Wulff Land Formation
- Merqujoq Formation
- Nordkronen Formation
- Nyeboe Land Formation
- Chester Bjerg Formation
- Sydgletscher Formation

== See also ==
- List of fossiliferous stratigraphic units in Greenland
- Pentamerus Bjerge
