= Wollaston Forland Group =

Geologic formation in Greenland

- Stratigraphic range: Cretaceous
- Type: Group

Location
- Country: Greenland

Type section
- Named for: Wollaston Foreland

The Wollaston Forland Group is a geologic group in Greenland. It preserves fossils dating back to the Cretaceous period.

== See also ==
- List of fossiliferous stratigraphic units in Greenland
