= List of fossiliferous stratigraphic units in Greenland =

Fossiliferous stratigraphic units in Greenland
Kap København Formation
Kap Brewster Group
Paleogene
Kangilia Formation
Late Cretaceous
Early Cretaceous
Late Jurassic-Early Cretaceous
Jurassic
Triassic
Permian
Carboniferous
Devonian
Silurian
Cambro-Ordovician
Buen Formation

This is a list of fossiliferous stratigraphic units in Greenland.

== List of fossiliferous stratigraphic units ==
Group	Formation	Age	Notes
	Kap København Formation	Gelasian	
	Kap København Formation	Blancan	
Kap Brewster		Late Miocene	
Kap Brewster		Middle Miocene	
Kap Dalton		Early Oligocene	
Kap Dalton		Late Eocene	
	Agatdal Formation	Selandian	
Nuussuaq	Atanikerluk Formation	Selandian	
	Eqalulik Formation	Danian	
	Kangilia Formation	Danian	
	Kangilia Formation	Maastrichtian	
	Pautut Formation	Campanian	
	Pautut Formation	Santonian	
	Atane Formation	Middle Cenomanian	
	Kome Formation	Albian	
	Steensby Bjerg Formation	Early Aptian	
	Kuhnpasset Formation	Late Barremian	
Wollaston Forland	Palnatokes Bjerg Formation	Late Hauterivian	
Wollaston Forland	Palnatokes Bjerg Formation	Early Valanginian	
	Hesteelv Formation	Berriasian	
	Hartz Fjeld Formation	Valanginian	
	Hartz Fjeld Formation	Tithonian	
	Lindemans Bugt Formation	Valanginian	
	Lindemans Bugt Formation	Berriasian	
	Lindemans Bugt Formation	Tithonian	
	Raukelv Formation	Berriasian	
	Raukelv Formation	Tithonian	
	Ladegardsaen Formation	Valanginian	
	Ladegardsaen Formation	Berriasian	
	Ladegardsaen Formation	Tithonian	
	Ladegardsaen Formation	Kimmeridgian	
	Ladegardsaen Formation	Middle Oxfordian	
	Kap Leslie Formation	Tithonian	
	Kap Leslie Formation	Kimmeridgian	
	Kap Leslie Formation	Oxfordian	
	Bernbjerg Formation	Kimmeridgian	
	Bernbjerg Formation	Late Oxfordian	
	Charkot Bugt Formation	Middle Oxfordian	
	Vardekloft Formation	Bathonian	
Kap Stewart	Cape Stewart Formation	Pliensbachian	
Kap Stewart	Cape Stewart Formation	Sinemurian	
Kap Stewart	Cape Stewart Formation	Hettangian	
Kap Stewart	Cape Stewart Formation	Late Triassic	
Scoresby Land	Fleming Fjord Formation	Rhaetian	
Scoresby Land	Fleming Fjord Formation	Norian	
	Isrand Formation	Ladinian (Longobardian)	
	Wordie Creek Formation	Induan (Griesbachian-Dienerian)	
	Wegener Halvo Formation	Induan (Griesbachian)	
	Wegener Halvo Formation	Changhsingian	
	Wegener Halvo Formation	Wuchiapingian	
	Schuchert Dal Formation	Changhsingian	
	Depot Island Formation	Wuchiapingian	
Foldvik Creek	Foldvik Creek Formation	Wuchiapingian	
	Ravnefjeld Formation	Wuchiapingian	
	Kim Fjelde Formation	Kungurian	
	Kim Fjelde Formation	Artinskian	
Upper Marine		Artinskian	
	Foldedal Formation	Gzhelian	
	Foldedal Formation	Kasimovian	
	Foldedal Formation	Moscovian	
	Kap Jungersen Formation	Gzhelian	
	Kap Jungersen Formation	Moscovian	
Lower Marine		Moscovian	
Celsius Bjerg	Britta Dal Formation	Famennian	
	Obrutschew Bjerg Formation	Famennian	
Peary Land	Chester Bjerg Formation	Gorstian	
	Kap Morton Formation	Homerian	
	Pentamerus Bjerg Formation	Wenlock	
	Pentamerus Bjerg Formation	Llandovery	
	Wulff Land Formation	Sheinwoodian	
	Wulff Land Formation	Telychian	
	Cap Godfred Hansen	Telychian	
	Bessels Fjord Formation	Telychian	
	Bessels Fjord Formation	Aeronian	
	Hauge Bjerge Formation	Telychian	
	Hauge Bjerge Formation	Aeronian	
	Lafayette Bugt Formation	Telychian	
	Lafayette Bugt Formation	Aeronian	
	Odins Fjord Formation	Telychian	
	Odins Fjord Formation	Aeronian	
	Ymers Gletscher Formation	Telychian	
	Ymers Gletscher Formation	Aeronian	
	Cape Schuchert Formation	Telychian	
	Cape Schuchert Formation	Aeronian	
	Cape Schuchert Formation	Rhuddanian	
Washington Land	Samuelsen Høj Formation	Telychian	
Washington Land	Samuelsen Høj Formation	Aeronian	
Washington Land	Samuelsen Høj Formation	Rhuddanian	
	Adams Bjerg Formation	Aeronian	
	Petermann Halvo Formation	Aeronian	
	Petermann Halvo Formation	Rhuddanian	
	Offley Island Formation	Llandovery	
	Turesø Formation	Aeronian	
	Turesø Formation	Rhuddanian	
	Turesø Formation	Hirnantian	
	Turesø Formation	Katian (Richmondian)	
	Aleqatsiaq Fjord Formation	Rhuddanian	
	Aleqatsiaq Fjord Formation	Hirnantian (Gamachian)	
	Aleqatsiaq Fjord Formation	Katian (Richmondian)	
	Cape Calhoun Formation	Cautleyan	
	Narwhal Sound Formation	Llandeilo	
	Narwhal Sound Formation	Rangerian	
	Cape Weber Formation	Arenig (Cassinian)	
	Poulsen Cliff Formation	Tremadocian	
	Cass Fjord Formation	Tremadocian	
	Cass Fjord Formation	Sunwaptan	
	Cass Fjord Formation	Trempealeauan	
Tavsens Iskappe	Holm Dal Formation	Marjumian	
Tavsens Iskappe	Holm Dal Formation	Menevian	
	Kap Stanton Formation	Middle Cambrian	
	Bastion Formation	Dyeran	
	Bastion Formation	Early Cambrian (Caerfai)	
	Ella Island Formation	Dyeran	
	Ella Island Formation	Botomian	
Brønlund Fjord	Aftenstjernesø Formation	Lenian-Dyeran	
Brønlund Fjord	Henson Gletscher Formation	Lenian-Dyeran	
Brønlund Fjord	Paralleldal Formation	Toyonian-Dyeran	
	Buen Formation	Atdabanian	
	Wyckoff Bjerg Formation	Early Cambrian	

== See also ==
- List of fossiliferous stratigraphic units in Antarctica
- Lists of fossiliferous stratigraphic units in North America
  - List of fossiliferous stratigraphic units in the Northwest Territories
  - List of fossiliferous stratigraphic units in Nunavut
  - List of fossiliferous stratigraphic units in Newfoundland and Labrador
- Lists of fossiliferous stratigraphic units in Europe
  - List of fossiliferous stratigraphic units in Iceland
  - List of fossiliferous stratigraphic units in Norway
  - List of fossiliferous stratigraphic units in Russia
  - List of fossiliferous stratigraphic units in Svalbard
