= Obrutschew Bjerg Formation =

Geologic formation in Greenland

- Stratigraphic range: Devonian
- Type: Formation

Location
- Country: Greenland

The Obrutschew Bjerg Formation is a geologic formation in Greenland. It is considered to be the second youngest unit of the Celsius Bjerg Group.

It preserves fossils dating back to the Devonian period, including the Actinopterygian fish Cuneognathus gardineri and the acanthodian Acanthodes lopatini. The formation also preserves and extensive coprolite fossil record.

== See also ==
- List of fossiliferous stratigraphic units in Greenland
