= Kome Formation =

Geologic formation in Greenland

- Stratigraphic range: Cretaceous
- Type: Formation
- Overlies: Atane Formation

Location
- Country: Greenland

The Kome Formation is a geologic formation in Greenland. It preserves fossils dating back to the Cretaceous period.

== See also ==
- List of fossiliferous stratigraphic units in Greenland
