= Tavsens Iskappe Group =

Geologic formation in Greenland

- Stratigraphic range: Cambrian
- Type: Group

Location
- Country: Greenland

Type section
- Named for: Hans Tausen Ice Cap

The Tavsens Iskappe Group is a geologic group in Greenland. It preserves fossils dating back to the Cambrian period.

== See also ==
- List of fossiliferous stratigraphic units in Greenland
