= Cass Fjord =

Fjord in northern Greenland

- Location in Greenland
- Location: Arctic
- Coordinates: 80°3′N 65°0′W
- Ocean/sea sources: Peabody Bay; Kane Basin
- Basin countries: Greenland
- Max. length: 25 km (16 mi)
- Max. width: 5.5 km (3.4 mi)

Cass Fjord is a fjord in northern Greenland. To the southwest, the fjord opens into the Kane Basin of the Nares Strait.

== Geography ==
The Cass Fjord opens to the SW at the northern end of Peabody Bay, north of Cape Clay. Cass Fjord forms Washington Land's southeastern coastline. The northern shore is fringed by 180 m (590 ft) high cliffs, known as Poulsens Klint.

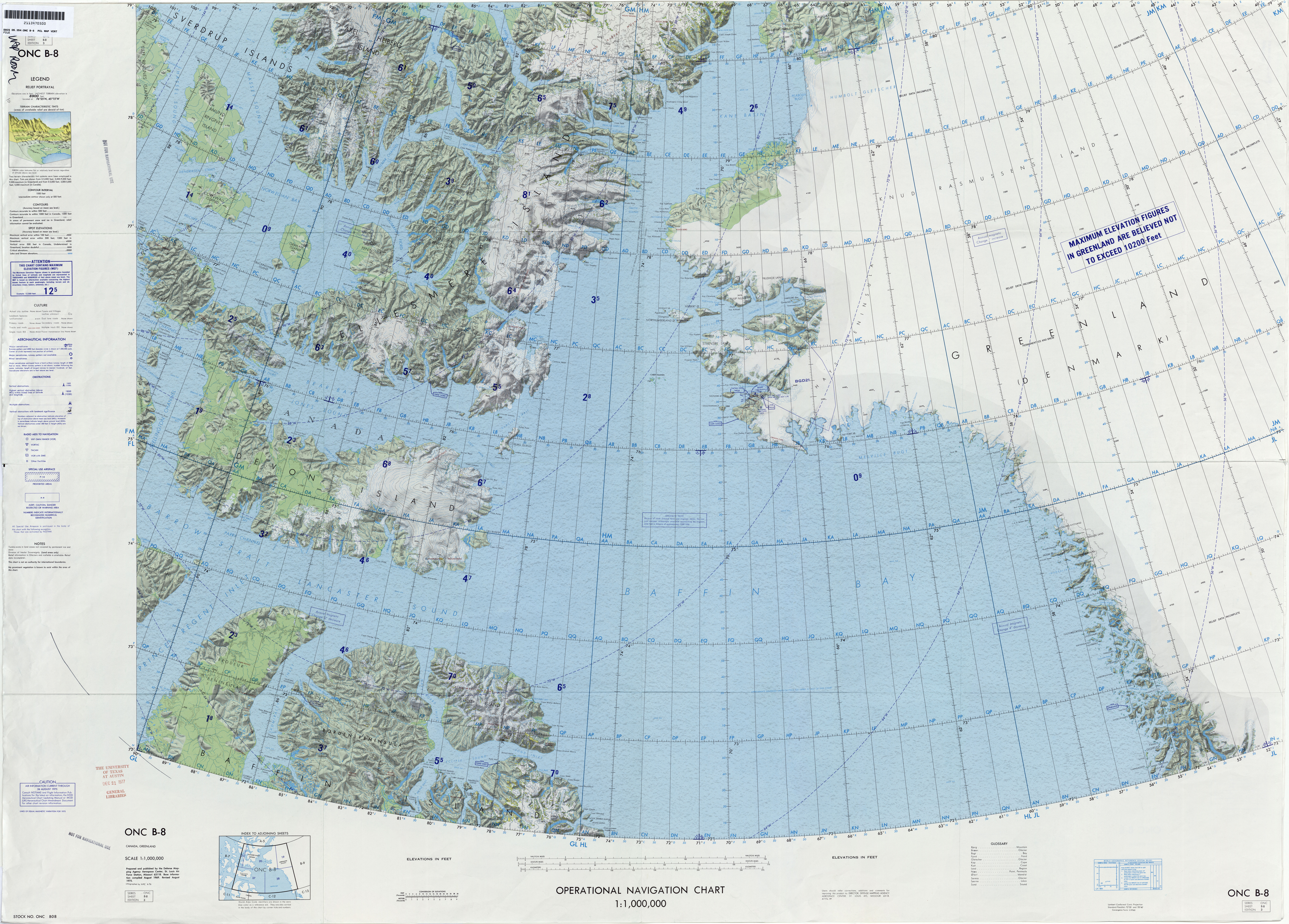
Map of Northwestern Greenland

== See also ==
- List of fjords of Greenland
- Cass Fjord Formation
