= Kap Kobenhavn Formation =

Geologic formation in Greenland

- Stratigraphic range: Neogene
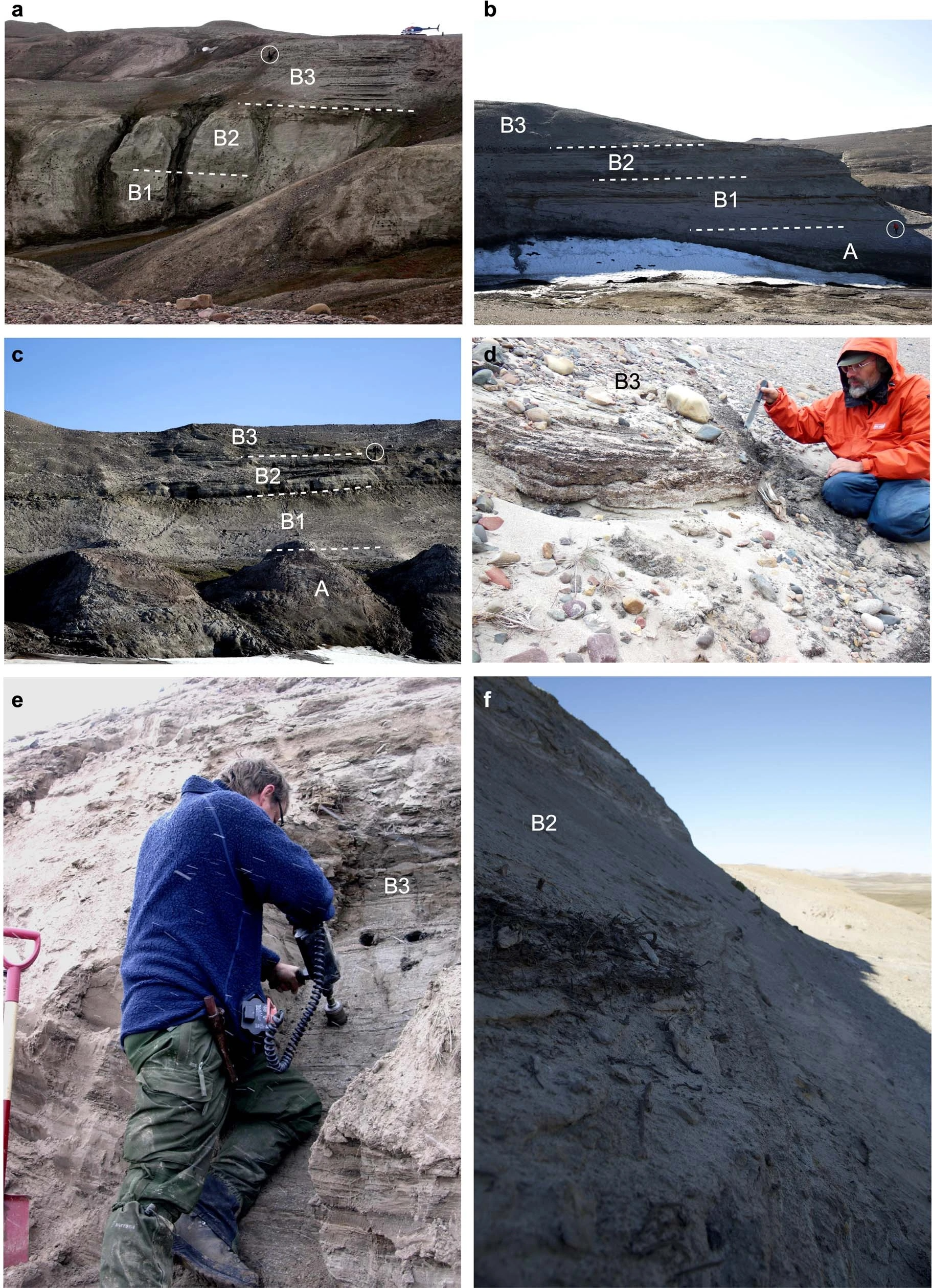
- An overview of the various locations of the formation, as well as the sampling process for organic material containing DNA fragments
- Type: Formation

Location
- Coordinates: 82°52′8″N 22°40′7″W
- Country: Greenland

The Kap Kobenhavn Formation (Cape Copenhagen Formation) is a geologic formation in Greenland. It preserves fossils dating back to the Neogene period.

Shotgun sequencing analysis of environmental DNA in samples from a 2006 expedition to the Kap Kobenhavn Formation have shown the DNA is at least two million years old. The DNA contains evidence of mastodon, arctic hare, black geese, poplar trees, birch trees, willow trees, avens, bilberry, horseshoe crabs, stony corals, and green algae. Scientists have reconstructed the site's average minimum temperature to be more than 10°C warmer than the present day. The presence of the mastodon DNA shows that they ranged much further north than previously known.

== See also ==
- List of fossiliferous stratigraphic units in Greenland
