= Foldedal Formation =

Geologic formation in Greenland

- Stratigraphic range: Carboniferous
- Type: Formation

Location
- Country: Greenland

The Foldedal Formation is a geologic formation in Greenland. It preserves fossils dating back to the Carboniferous period.

== See also ==
- List of fossiliferous stratigraphic units in Greenland
