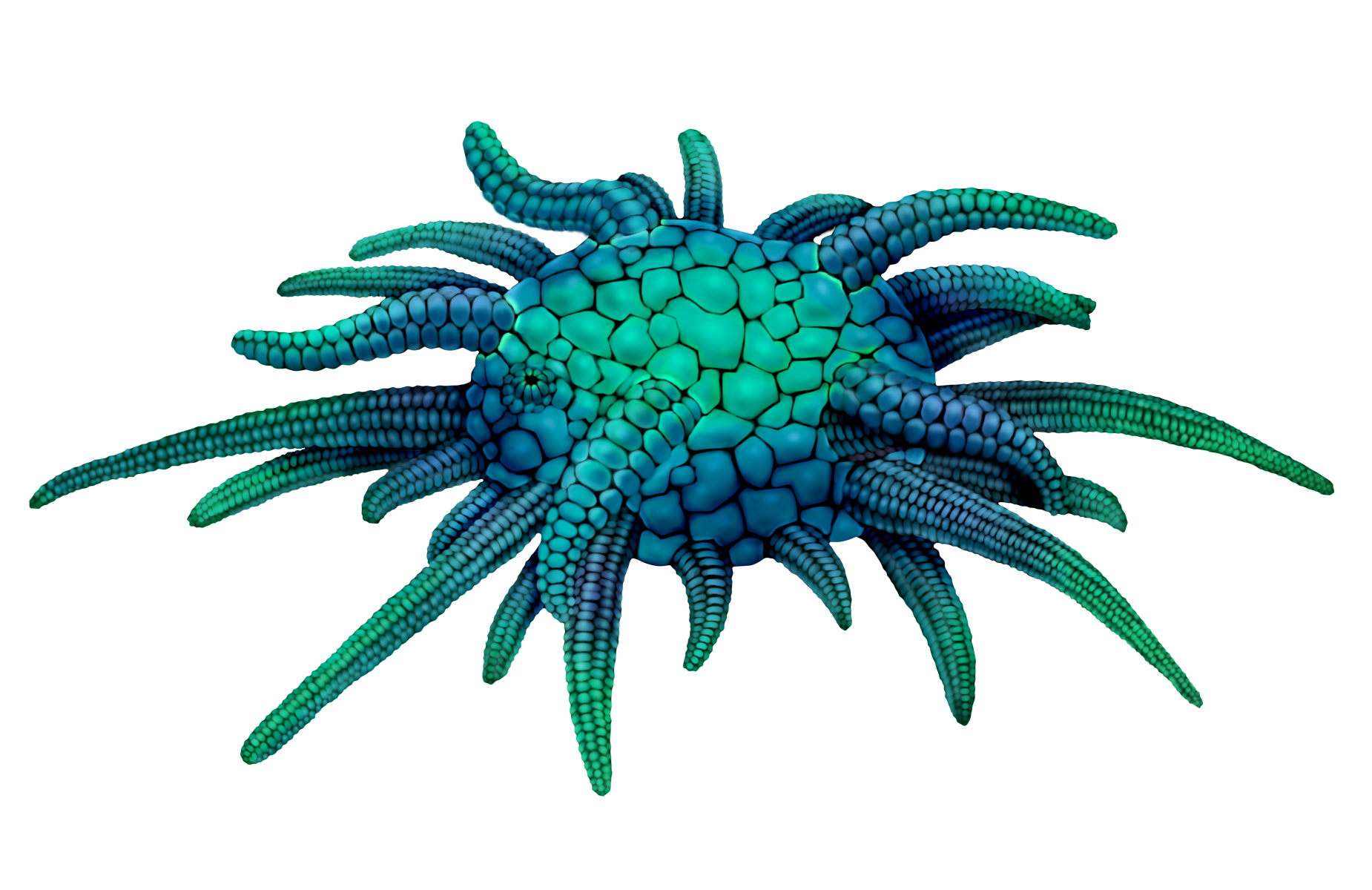
- Life restoration of Sollasina cthulhu

Scientific classification
- Kingdom: Animalia
- Phylum: Echinodermata
- Class: Ophiocistioidea
- Family: †Sollasinidae
- Genus: †Sollasina; Fedotov, 1926

Species
- Sollasina woodwardi Sollas, 1899 (type); Sollasina westfalica Richter, 1930; Sollasina cthulhu Rahman et al., 2019

= Sollasina =

Sollasina Temporal range: Homerian–Eifelian

Extinct genus of marine invertebrates

Sollasina is an extinct genus of ophiocistioid that is known from Silurian to Devonian.

== Taxonomy ==
Sollasina cthulhu from the Coalbrookdale Formation of the Silurian Herefordshire Lagerstätte in England was named after H. P. Lovecraft's Cthulhu Mythos. The fossil was 3 cm wide, and the animal was likely the size of a large spider, with 45 tentacle-like tube feet.
