= Cass Fjord Formation =

Geologic formation in Greenland

- Stratigraphic range: Ordovician
- Type: Formation

Location
- Country: Greenland

Type section
- Named for: Cass Fjord

The Cass Fjord Formation is a geologic formation in Greenland. It preserves fossils dating back to the Ordovician period. The Cass Fjord is a geographic feature at the northern end of Peabody Bay on the eastern side of the Kane Basin in northwestern Greenland.

== See also ==
- List of fossiliferous stratigraphic units in Greenland
