= Bernbjerg Formation =

Geologic formation in Greenland

- Stratigraphic range: Jurassic
- Type: Formation

Location
- Country: Greenland

The Bernbjerg Formation is a geologic formation in Greenland. It preserves fossils dating back to the Jurassic period.

== See also ==
- List of fossiliferous stratigraphic units in Greenland
