= Nuussuaq Group =

Geologic formation in Greenland

- Stratigraphic range: Paleogene
- Type: Group

Location
- Country: Greenland

The Nuussuaq Group is a geologic group in Greenland. It preserves fossils dated to the Paleogene period.

== See also ==
- List of fossiliferous stratigraphic units in Greenland
