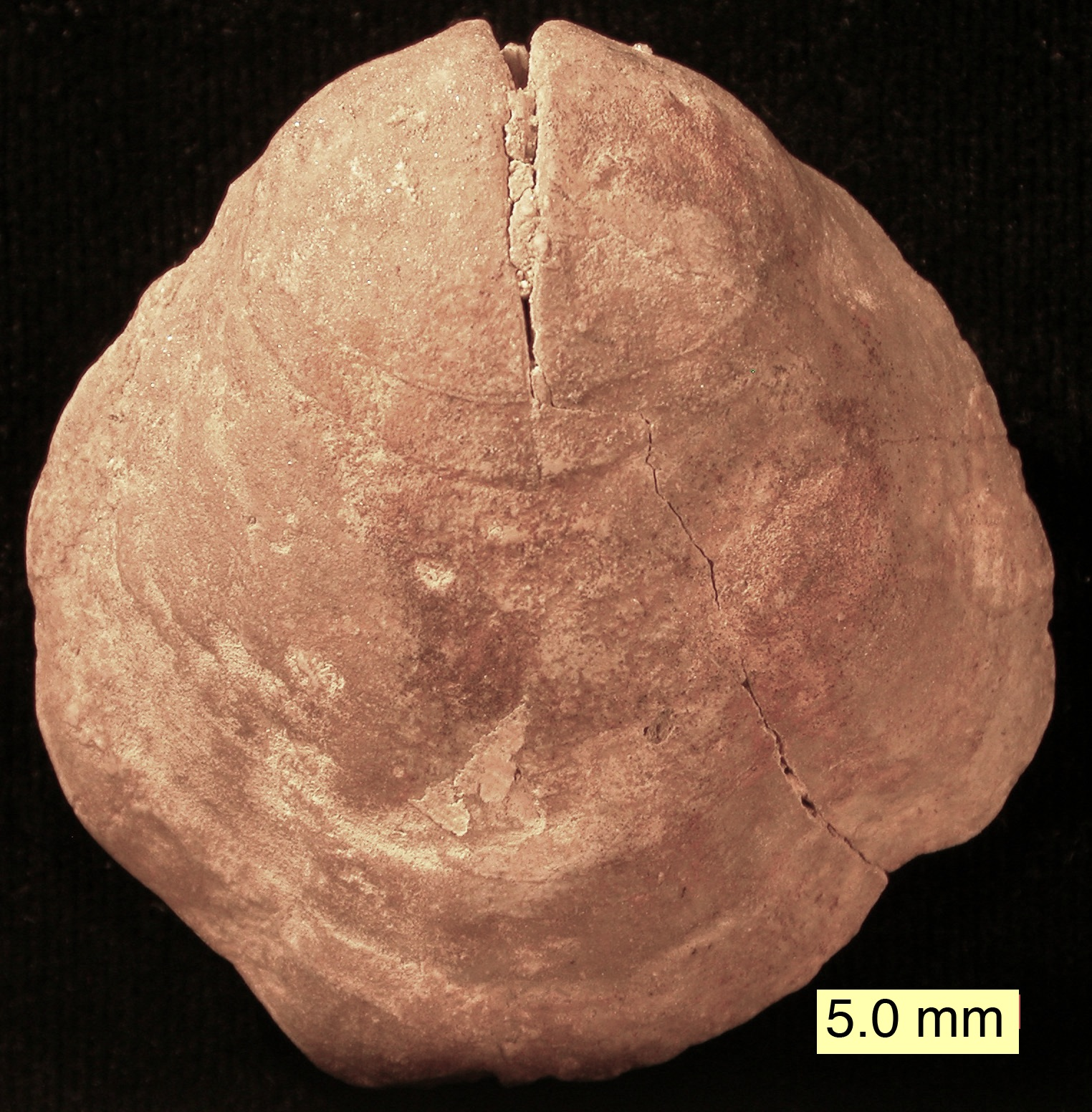
- Silurian Pentamerus brachiopod.

Scientific classification
- Kingdom: Animalia
- Phylum: Brachiopoda
- Class: Rhynchonellata
- Order: †Pentamerida
- Family: †Pentameridae
- Genus: †Pentamerus; Sowerby, 1813

= Pentamerus =

Pentamerus Temporal range: Silurian - Middle Devonian

Genus of brachiopods

The gall mite genus Pentamerus, established by Roivainen in 1951, is invalid and needs to be renamed. Until this happens, use Pentamerus (mite).

Pentamerus (meaning "five thighs") is a prehistoric genus of brachiopods that lived from the Silurian to the Middle Devonian in Asia, Europe, and North America.

== See also ==
- Pentamerus Range

== Sources ==
- Fossils (Smithsonian Handbooks) by David Ward (Page 82)
