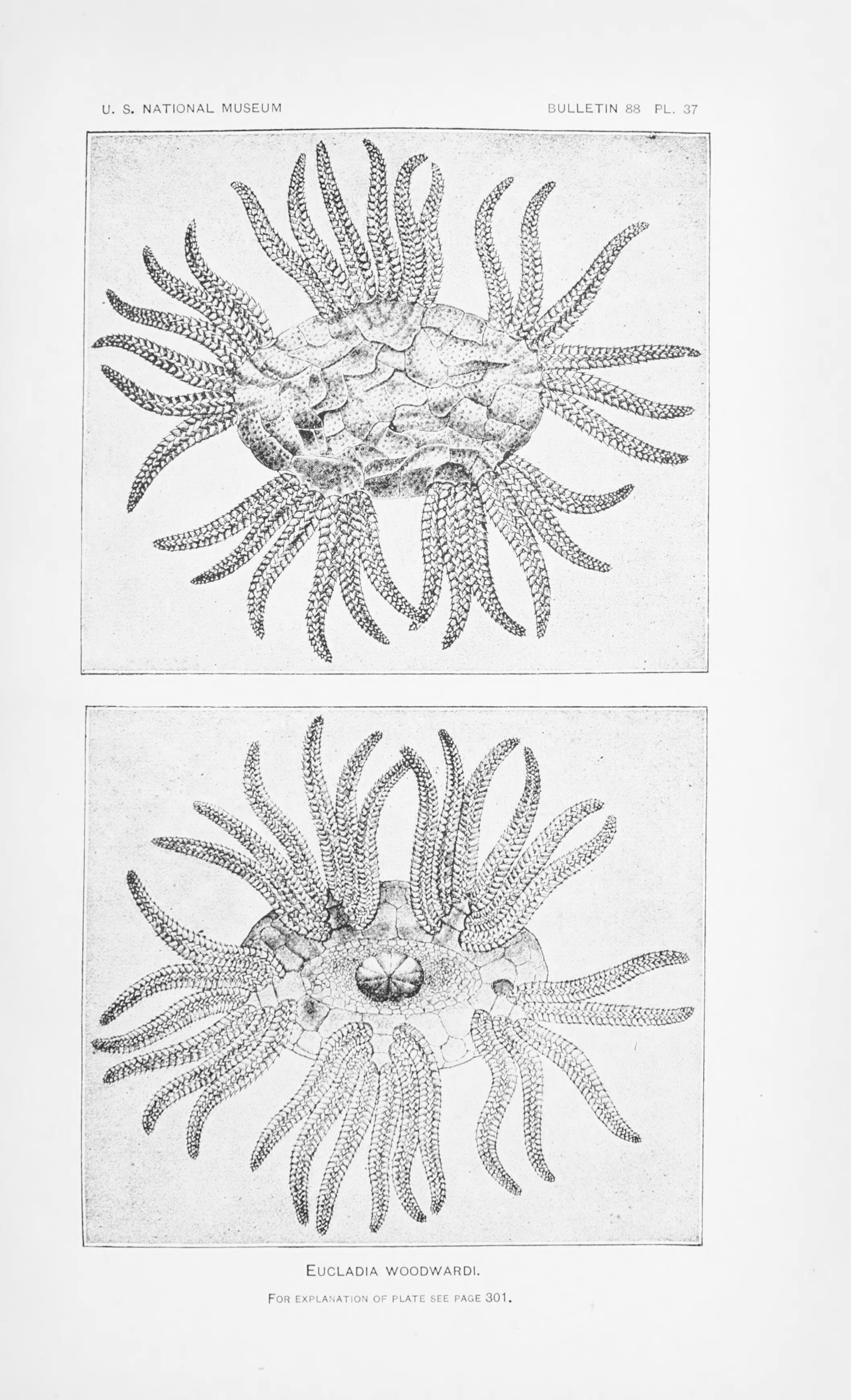
- Restoration of Eucladia woodwardi dorsal (top) and ventral (bottom) views

Scientific classification
- Kingdom: Animalia
- Phylum: Echinodermata
- Subphylum: Echinozoa
- Class: Ophiocistioidea

= Ophiocistioidea =

Ophiocistioidea Temporal range: Ordovician–Carnian

Extinct class of marine invertebrates

Ophiocistioidea is a class of extinct echinoderms from the Palaeozoic and early Mesozoic. They most likely form a paraphyletic grade along sea cucumber stem lineage, although some sources still consider the question of ophiocistioid monophyly unresolved.

== Etymology ==
Ophiocistioidea is named from the Greek words ὄφις (ophis) "snake" and κίστη (kiste) "box".

== Anatomy ==
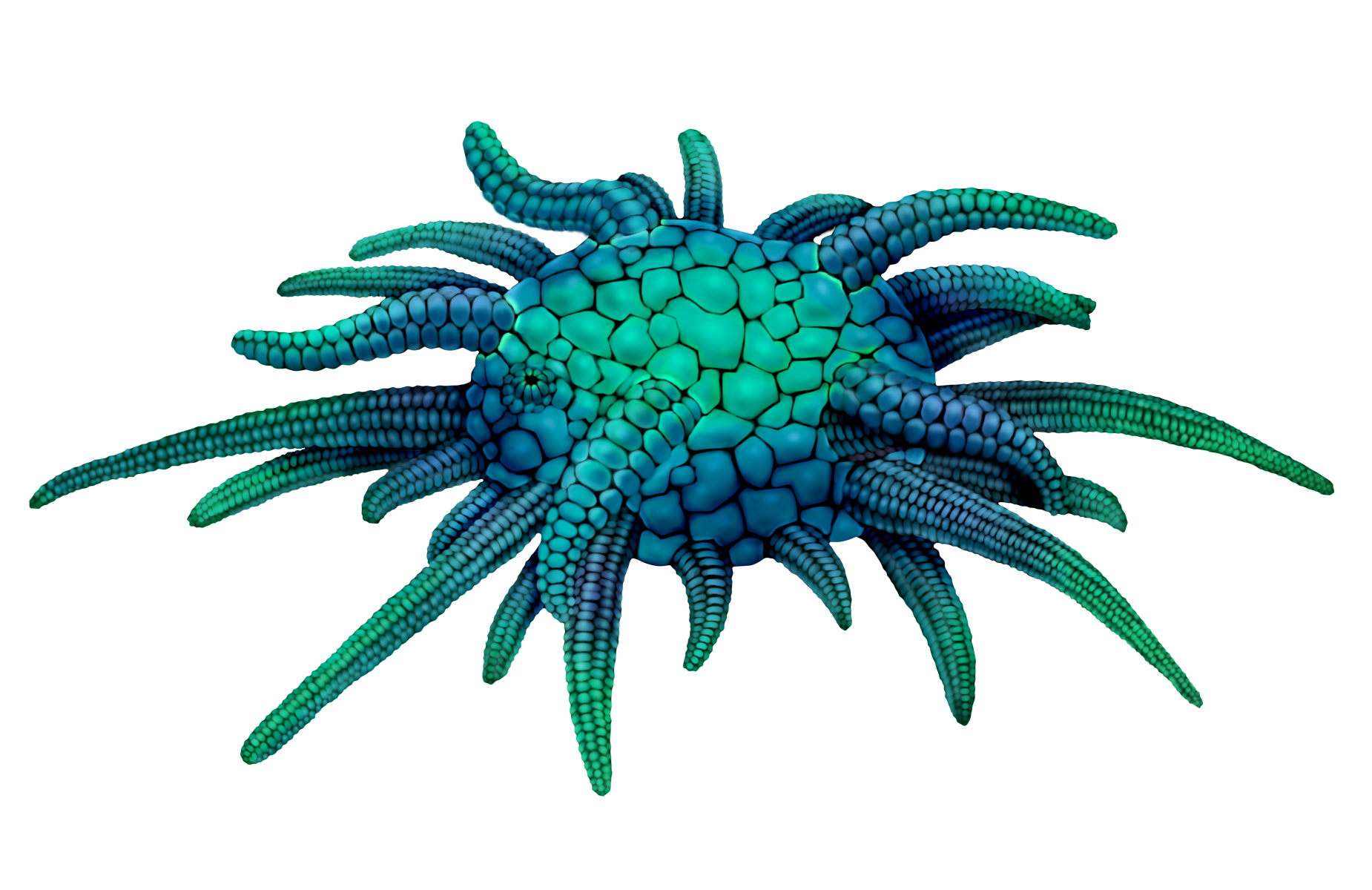
Sollasina cthulhu

Ophiocistioids had a flattened globular body encased in a solid test of calcareous plates, similar to that of a modern sea urchin. As with sea urchins, the mouth faced downwards and contains a structure known as an Aristotle's lantern. Unlike sea urchins, the anus was laterally placed rather than being at the center of the upper surface. Five ambulacra radiated outwards from the mouth across the lower surface, but only continued around the edge to just under the level of the anus. The madreporite was to one side of the mouth. Ophiocistioids had unusually long tube feet emerging from near the mouth and around the edges of the body. Unlike the tube feet of other echinoderms, these tube feet were covered in stereom plates.

== Phylogeny ==
The skeletal structure, close to that of sea urchins (and sea cucumbers for some soft species), often places these animals in Echinozoa. However, the data are still insufficient to finally decide on this case: the study of particularly well-preserved fossils suggests that Ophiocistioidea could be the ancestor group of sea cucumbers.

At present, about 40 species have been identified (10 are from the Devonian, which seems to be the golden age of this group), categorized into 17 genera and 6 families. Most of the fossils have been found in North America and Europe, with some in Australia.

List of families and genera from Reich & Haude (2004)

- Family Volchoviidae Hecker, 1938
  - genus Volchovia Hecker, 1938
- Family Eucladidae Gregory, 1896
  - genus Eucladia Woodward, 1869
  - genus Anguloserra Haude & Langenstrassen, 1976
- Family Sollasinidae Fedotov, 1926
  - genus Sollasina Fedotov, 1926
  - genus Euthemon Sollas, 1899
  - genus Cardioserra Romanek, 1984
  - genus Klukovicella Prokop & Petr, 1987
- Family Rhenosquamidae Richter, 1930
  - genus Rhenosquama Richter, 1930
  - genus Gillocystis Jell, 1983
- Famille Rotasacciidae Haude & Langenstrassen, 1976
  - genus Rotasaccus Haude & Langenstrassen, 1976 [ 1976b]
  - genus Erisserra Boczarowski,2001
  - genus Longiserra Boczarowski, 2001
  - genus Ornatoserra Boczarowski, 2001
  - genus Pararotasaccus Kozur &Mostler, 1989
- Family Linguaserridae Reich & Haude 2004
  - genus Linguaserra Langer, 1991

== Gallery ==
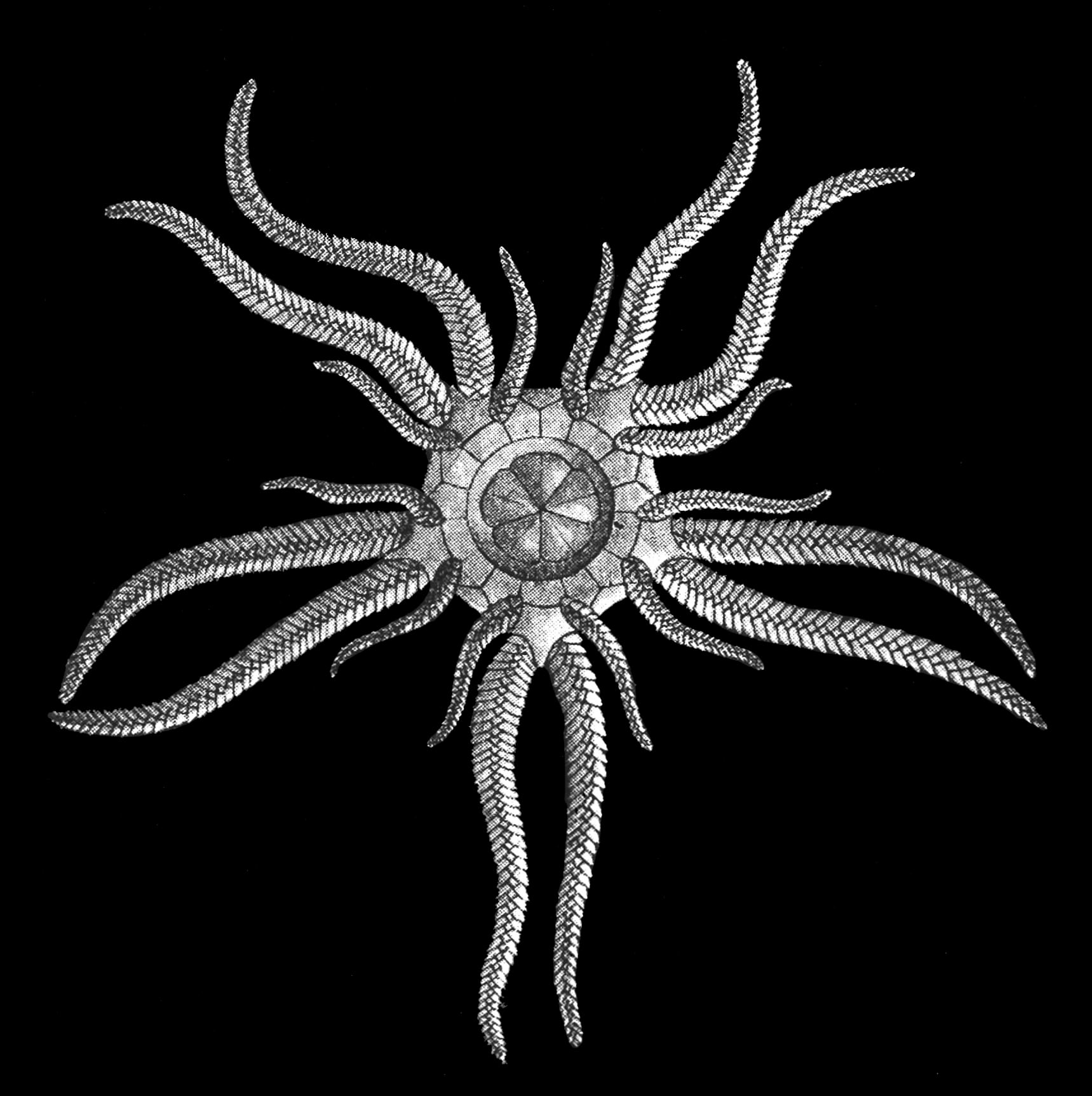
reconstruction of Euthemon sp. (Sollasinidae).

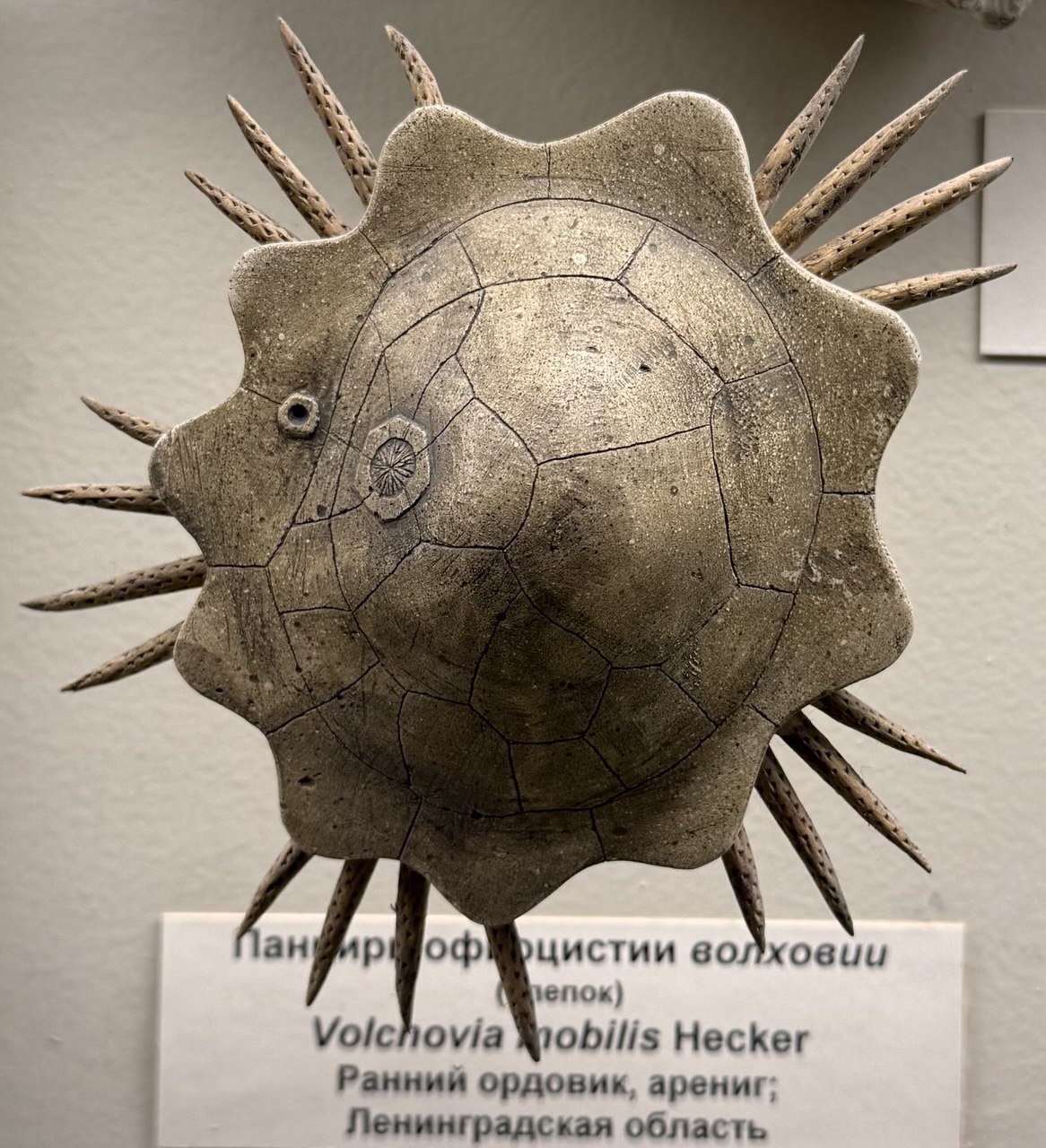
reconstruction of Volchovia mobilis (Volchoviidae)

== See also ==
- List of echinoderm orders
