= Meristina =

Meristina Temporal range: Late Ordovician – Middle Devonian

Scientific classification
- Domain: Eukaryota
- Kingdom: Animalia
- Phylum: Brachiopoda
- Class: Rhynchonellata
- Order: †Spiriferida
- Family: †Meristellidae
- Genus: †Meristina; Hall, 1867

Synonyms
- Whitfieldia Davidson, 1882

Genus of brachiopods

Meristina is an extinct genus of brachiopods that lived from the Late Ordovician to the Middle Devonian of Asia, Europe, and North America. Meristina had a smooth convex shell with a one-inch diameter.
