= Atane Formation =

Geologic formation in Greenland

- Stratigraphic range: Albian-Coniacian; ~112–85 Ma
- Type: Formation
- Sub-units: Skansen Member
- Underlies: Kome Formation
- Overlies: Slibestensfjeldet Formation

Lithology
- Primary: Mudstone
- Other: Sandstone, coal

Location
- Coordinates: 69.4°N 52.8°W
- Approximate paleocoordinates: 55.1°N 16.9°W
- Region: Ivnanguit
- Country: Greenland
- Extent: Nuussuaq Basin
- Atane Formation (Greenland)

The Atane Formation is a geologic formation in Greenland. It preserves fossil insects of Elytrulum multipunctatum, dated to the Albian to Coniacian ages of the Cretaceous period.

== Description ==
The carbonaceous mudstones, sandstones and coal seams are interpreted as freshwater lake or swamp deposits representing the vertical aggradation of a subaerial to shallow, limnic floodplain to upper delta plain. There are no indications –neither palynological evidence nor the presence of pyrite– to suggest marine or brackish-water conditions.

== See also ==
- List of fossiliferous stratigraphic units in Greenland
