= Kap Stewart Group =

Geological group in eastern Greenland

- Stratigraphic range: Rhaetian-Sinemurian
- Type: Group
- Sub-units: Innakajik, Primulaelv & Rhætelv Formations
- Underlies: Neill Klinter Group
- Overlies: Scoresby Land Group
- Area: >12,000 km^{2} (4,600 sq mi)
- Thickness: 155–600 m (509–1,969 ft)

Location
- Region: Greenland

Type section
- Named for: Kap Stewart

The Kap Stewart Group is a geological group in eastern Greenland of Late Triassic (Rhaetian) to Early Jurassic (Sinemurian) age. It consists of a 155-600 m thick sequence of interbedded mudstones and fluvio-deltiac sandstones deposited in a "large wave and storm-dominated lake".

== Description ==
Originally known as the Kap Stewart Formation, it was later raised to Group status. It comprises three formations, the organic-rich lacustrine mudstones with interbedded sheet sandstones of the Rhætelv Formation (developed in the basin centre) the alluvial plain sandstone and conglomerate of the Innakajik Formation overlain by delta plain sandstones to mudstones of the Primulaelv Formation (both restricted to the basin margin).
