= Pentamerus Range =

Mountain range in Greenland

- Pentamerus Bjerge
- Location within Greenland

Geography
- Country: Greenland
- Range coordinates: 80°39′N 64°30′W

Geology
- Rock age: Lower Silurian

The Pentamerus Range (Danish: Pentamerus Bjerge) is a mountain range in far northwestern Greenland. Administratively this range is part of Avannaata municipality. The area of the range is uninhabited.

Archaeological ruins including winter houses have been found near the range on Fossil Bay, about 30 km (19 mi) to the north.

This mountain chain was named after the Pentamerus fossils dating back to the Lower Silurian that have been found in it.

== Geography ==
The Pentamerus Range is an up to almost 1,000 m high mountain range in Washington Land. It runs roughly from northeast to southwest.

== See also ==
- List of mountain ranges of Greenland
- Peary Land Group

== Bibliography ==
- Greenland geology and selected mineral occurrences - GEUS
