= Much Wenlock Limestone Formation =

- Stratigraphic range: Wenlock Homerian
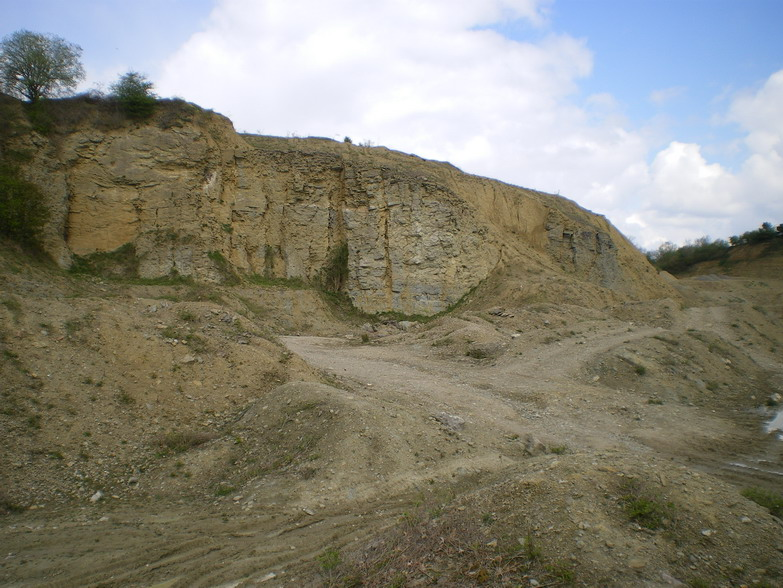
- Limestones of the Much Wenlock Formation exposed in Farley Quarry, Shropshire
- Type: Geological formation
- Underlies: Elton Formation
- Overlies: Coalbrookdale Formation
- Thickness: 29 m in type area

Lithology
- Primary: Limestone

Location
- Region: Welsh Marches
- Country: United Kingdom

Type section
- Named for: Much Wenlock

The Much Wenlock Limestone Formation is a series of Silurian limestone beds that date back to the Homerian age, the later part of the Wenlock epoch. The formation comprises nodular to thinly bedded limestones, with variable development of reef bodies that can be found exposed at Wenlock Edge and in a small area near Dudley, England known as Wren's Nest. The formation is made up of three different members which have been classified as the Lower Quarried Limestone Member, the Nodular Beds Member and the Upper Quarried Limestone Member. Many of the members can be subdivided into separate lithofacies that would have been deposited under different environmental conditions. However the overall environment of deposition for the formation is in a shallow, tropical marine setting that is located between the storm wave base and the fair weather wave base.
