= Buildwas Formation =

Buildwas Formation formerly Wenlock Shale
- Stratigraphic range: Sheinwoodian; 433.4–430.5 Ma
- Type: Formation
- Underlies: Barr Limestone Formation
- Overlies: Rubery Formation
- Thickness: 22 to 40 m (72 to 131 ft)

Lithology
- Primary: Mudstone
- Other: Limestone

Location
- Coordinates: 52.6°N 2.5°W
- Approximate paleocoordinates: 27.8°S 13.0°W
- Region: Shropshire
- Country: England
- Extent: Walsall to Wenlock Edge

Type section
- Named for: Buildwas
- Named by: Butler
- Location: Left bank of Hughley Brook
- Year defined: 1937
- Coordinates: 52°38′32″N 002°32′05″W
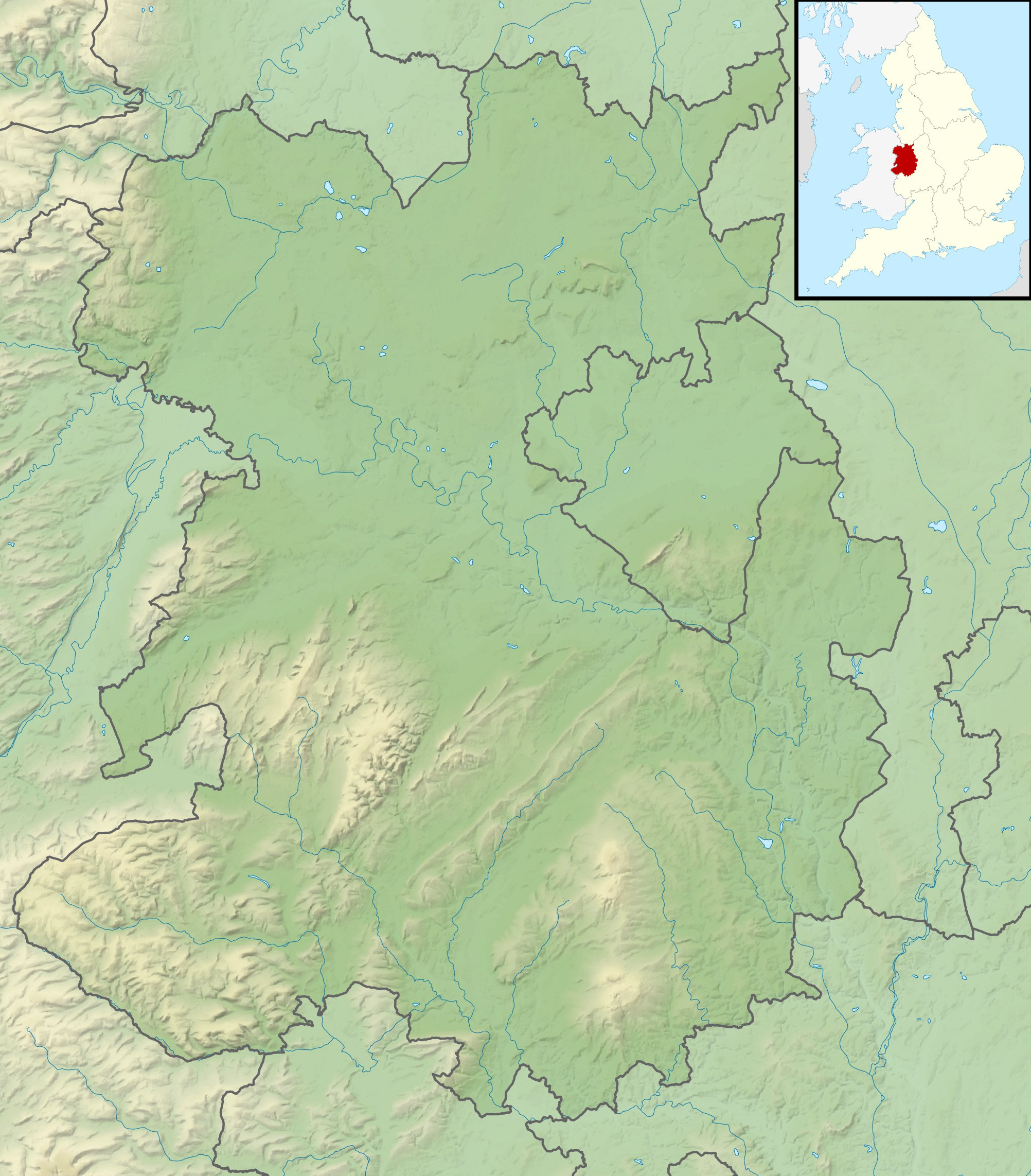
- Buildwas Formation (England) Buildwas Formation (Shropshire)

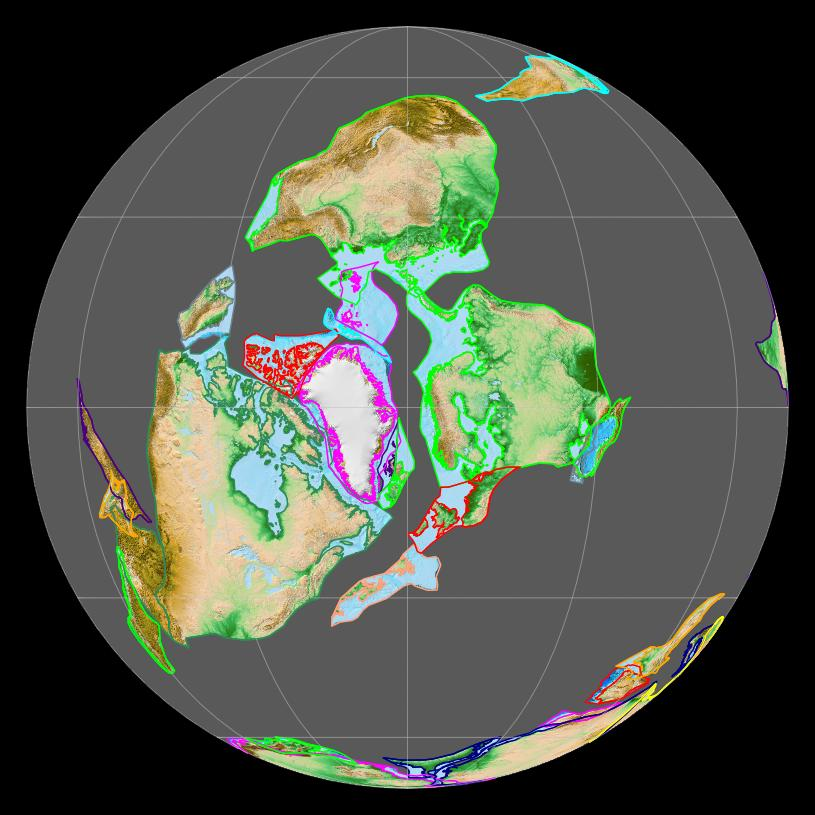
Paleogeography of the Early Silurian, 430 Ma

The Buildwas Formation (Bw, BUI), formerly called Wenlock Shale and Buildwas Beds, is a geologic formation in Shropshire, England. It preserves fossils dating back to the Silurian period. The formation is the defining formation of the Sheinwoodian age of the Wenlock epoch, the Middle Silurian.

== Description ==
The Buildwas Formation comprises olive-green and grey calcareous mudstones and nodular to lenticular calcareous mudstones and argillaceous limestones with shell fragments present throughout. The basal part of the formation consists of grey-green rubbly mudstones, containing comminuted shell debris and overlies the mottled green, grey and purple mudstones of the Rubery Formation with a 1 metre (3.3 ft) thick transition in colour and upward decrease in number of hard siltstone beds. The top of the Buildwas Formation shows a gradational increase in thickness of beds and a number of limestone beds, where it grades into the overlying Barr Limestone Formation.

The thickness of the formation ranges from 22 to 40 metres (72 to 131 ft), with the thinnest outcrops occurring near Walsall thickening towards Wenlock Edge. The type section of the formation was defined by Barrett in 1989 along the left (north) bank of Hughley Brook, 200 metres (660 ft) southeast of Leasows Farm and 500 metres (1,600 ft) northeast of Hughley Church. The formation has provided fossils of Eodictyonella capewellii.

== See also ==
- List of fossiliferous stratigraphic units in England
