= 59th =

59th is the ordinal form of the number 59. 59th or Fifty-ninth may also refer to:

- A fraction, 1/59, equal to one of 59 equal parts

== Geography ==
- 59th meridian east, a line of longitude
- 59th meridian west, a line of longitude
- 59th parallel north, a circle of latitude
- 59th parallel south, a circle of latitude
- 59th Street (disambiguation)
- 59th Street station (disambiguation)

== Military ==
- 59th Army (disambiguation)
- 59th Brigade (disambiguation)
- 59th Corps (German Empire)
- 59th Division (disambiguation)
- 59th Quartermaster Company, U.S. Army
- 59th Regiment (disambiguation)
- 59th Squadron (disambiguation)
- 59th Medical Wing, U.S. Air Force

== Other ==
- 59th century
- 59th century BC

== See also ==
- 59 (disambiguation)
- Fifty-Niner, nickname for gold seekers in western Kansas Territory and southwestern Nebraska Territory in 1859
