= 122nd meridian =

122nd meridian may refer to:

- 122nd meridian east, a line of longitude east of the Greenwich Meridian
- 122nd meridian west, a line of longitude west of the Greenwich Meridian

122nd meridian west	122nd meridian east
