= 56th meridian =

56th meridian may refer to:

- 56th meridian east, a line of longitude east of the Greenwich Meridian
- 56th meridian west, a line of longitude west of the Greenwich Meridian

| 56th meridian west | 56th meridian east |
