= 59th meridian =

59th meridian may refer to:

- 59th meridian east, a line of longitude east of the Greenwich Meridian
- 59th meridian west, a line of longitude west of the Greenwich Meridian

59th meridian west	59th meridian east

- Meridian 59, an online computer role-playing game
