= 121st meridian =

121st meridian may refer to:

- 121st meridian east, a line of longitude east of the Greenwich Meridian
- 121st meridian west, a line of longitude west of the Greenwich Meridian

121st meridian west	121st meridian east
