= 59th Army =

59th Army may refer to:

- Fifty-Ninth Army (Japan)
- 59th Army (Soviet Union)
- 59th Air Army, Soviet Union

== See also ==
- List of armies by number
- 59th Division (disambiguation)
- 59th Brigade (disambiguation)
- 59th Regiment (disambiguation)
- 59th Squadron (disambiguation)
- 59th (disambiguation)
