= 123rd meridian =

123rd meridian may refer to:

- 123rd meridian east, a line of longitude east of the Greenwich Meridian
- 123rd meridian west, a line of longitude west of the Greenwich Meridian

123rd meridian west	123rd meridian east
