= 57th meridian =

57th meridian may refer to:

- 57th meridian east, a line of longitude east of the Greenwich Meridian
- 57th meridian west, a line of longitude west of the Greenwich Meridian

57th meridian west	57th meridian east
