= 58th meridian =

58th meridian may refer to:

- 58th meridian east, a line of longitude east of the Greenwich Meridian
- 58th meridian west, a line of longitude west of the Greenwich Meridian

58th meridian west	58th meridian east
