= 124th meridian =

124th meridian may refer to:

- 124th meridian east, a line of longitude east of the Greenwich Meridian
- 124th meridian west, a line of longitude west of the Greenwich Meridian

| 124th meridian west | 124th meridian east |
