= 59th Division =

In military terms, 59th Division may refer to:

== Infantry divisions ==
- 59th Division (People's Republic of China)
- 59th Infantry Division (Wehrmacht), Germany
- 59th Infantry Division "Cagliari", Italian Army of World War II
- 59th Division (Imperial Japanese Army)
- 59th Infantry Division (Russian Empire)
- 59th Guards Motor Rifle Division, Soviet Union
- 59th Rifle Division, Soviet Union
- 59th Division (Spain)
- 59th (2nd North Midland) Division, British infantry division in World War I
- 59th (Staffordshire) Infantry Division, British infantry division in World War II
- 59th Infantry Division (United States)

== See also ==
- List of military divisions by number
- 59th Army (disambiguation)
- 59th Brigade (disambiguation)
- 59th Regiment (disambiguation)
- 59th Squadron (disambiguation)
