= 59 =

59 may refer to:

- 59 (number), the natural number following 58 and preceding 60
- one of the years 59 BC, AD 59, 1959, 2059
- 59 (album), by Puffy AmiYumi
- 59 (golf), a round of 59 in golf
- "Fifty Nine", a song by Karma to Burn from the album Arch Stanton, 2014
- 59 Elpis, a main-belt asteroid
- The Fifty-Nine Icosahedra a book by H. S. M. Coxeter, and others it enumerates stellations of the regular icosahedron,

== See also ==
- 59th (disambiguation)
- Fifty-Niner
