= Qing'an Guildhall =

Historic building in Ningbo, China

Coordinates: 29.8747°N 121.5589°E

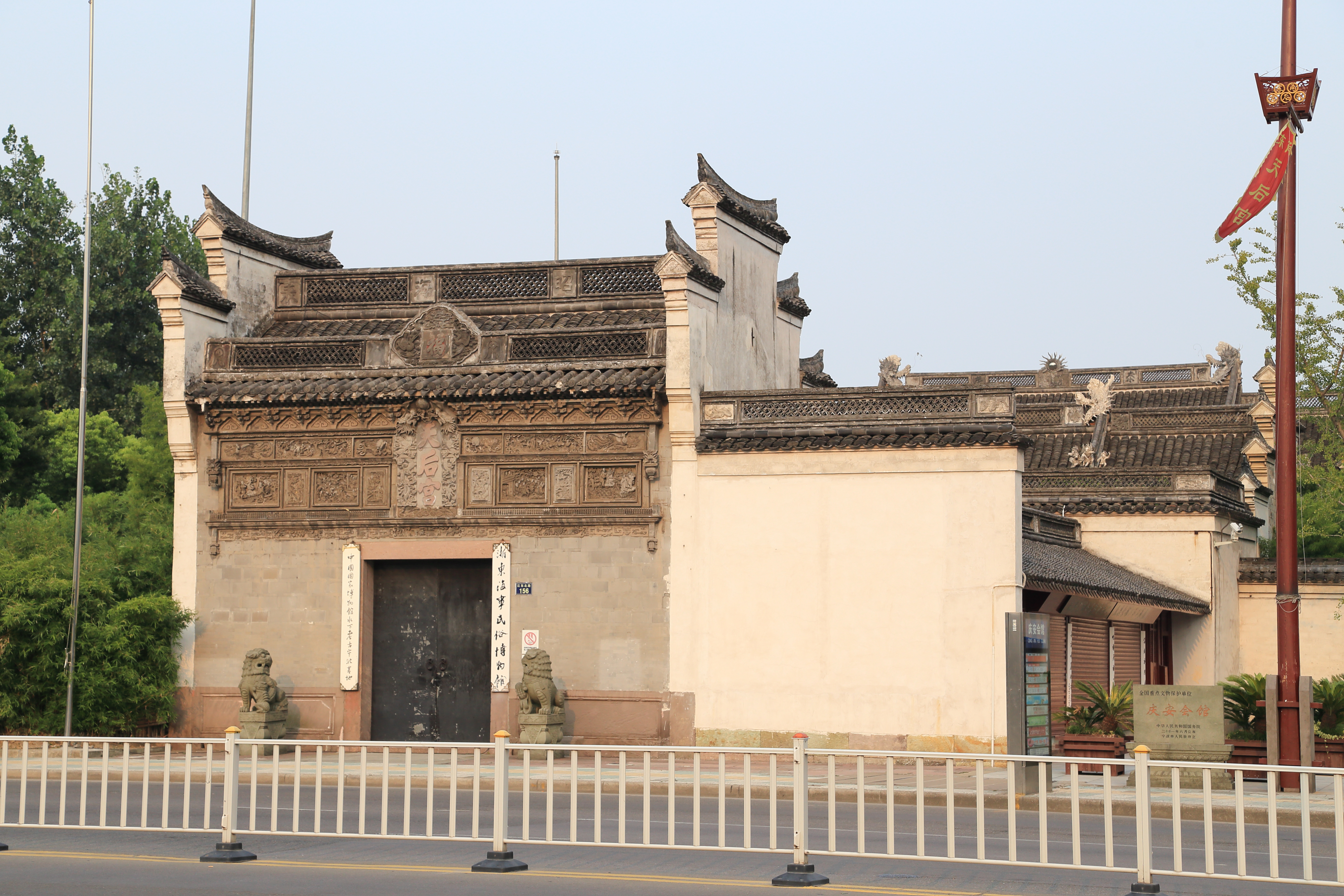
- The EZMAFCM from across Jiangdong Rd
- Traditional Chinese: 浙東海事民俗博物館
- Simplified Chinese: 浙东海事民俗博物馆
- Literal meaning: East(ern) Zhejiang Maritime Affairs and Folk Customs Museum
Transcriptions
Standard Mandarin
- Hanyu Pinyin: Zhèdōng Hǎishì Mínsú Bówùguǎn
- Wade–Giles: Chê-tung Hai-shih Min-su Po-wu-kuan

Qing'an Guild Hall
- Traditional Chinese: 慶安會館
- Simplified Chinese: 庆安会馆
- Literal meaning: The [Guild] Assembly Hall Celebrating Peace[ful Seas]
Transcriptions
Standard Mandarin
- Hanyu Pinyin: Qìng'ān Huìguǎn
- Wade–Giles: Ch‘ing-an Hui-kuan

Former names
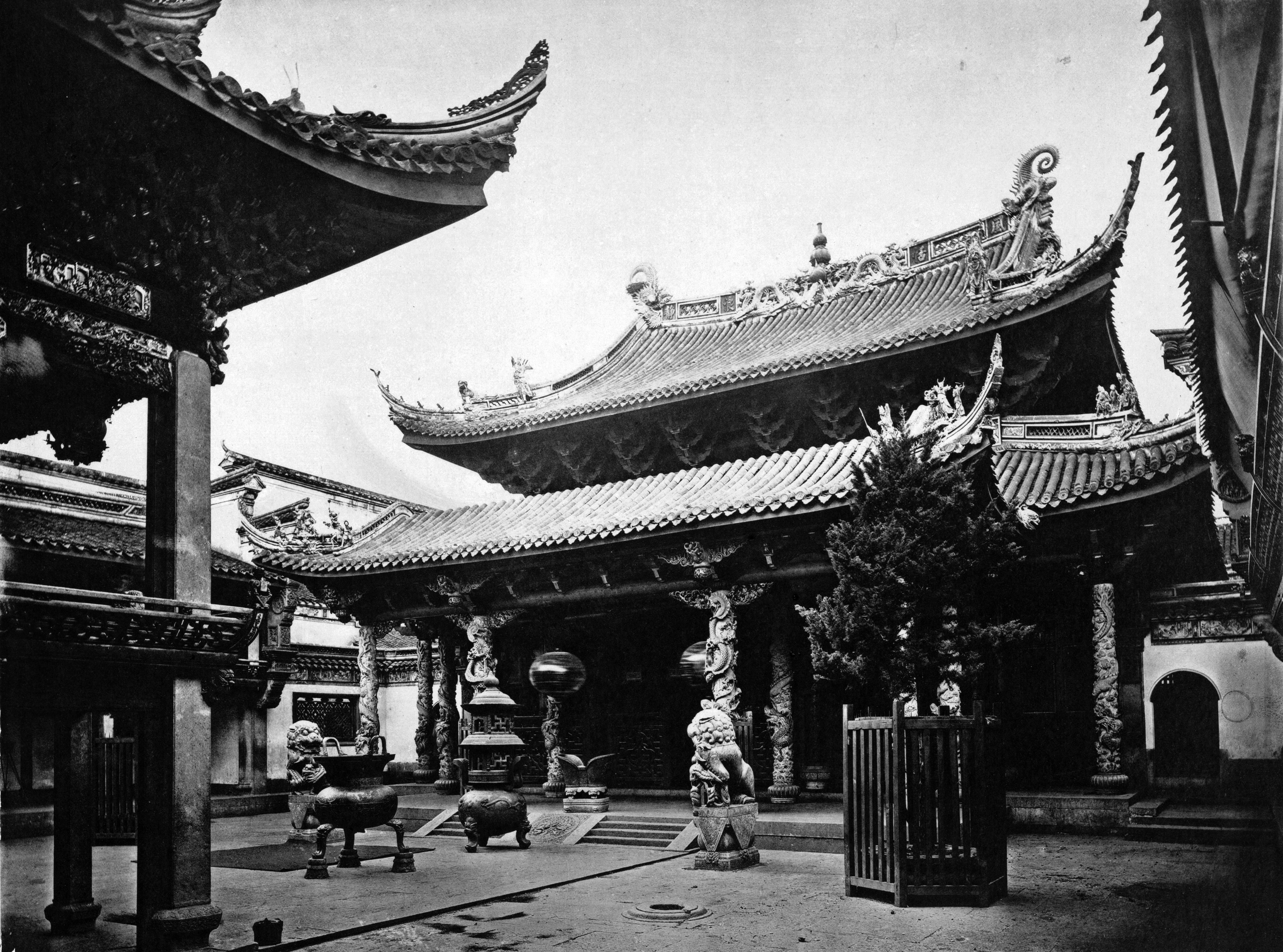
- Thomson's photograph of the temple's Great Hall c. 1870

Fujianese Guildhall
- Traditional Chinese: 福建會館
- Simplified Chinese: 福建会馆
- Literal meaning: Fujianese [Guild] Assembly Hall
Transcriptions
Standard Mandarin
- Hanyu Pinyin: Fujian Huìguǎn
- Wade–Giles: Fu-chien Hui-kuan

North Guildhall
- Traditional Chinese: 北號會館
- Simplified Chinese: 北号会馆
- Literal meaning: North[ern Traders] Guildhall
Transcriptions
Standard Mandarin
- Hanyu Pinyin: Bei Háo Huìguǎn
- Wade–Giles: Pei Hao Hui-kuan

Former names
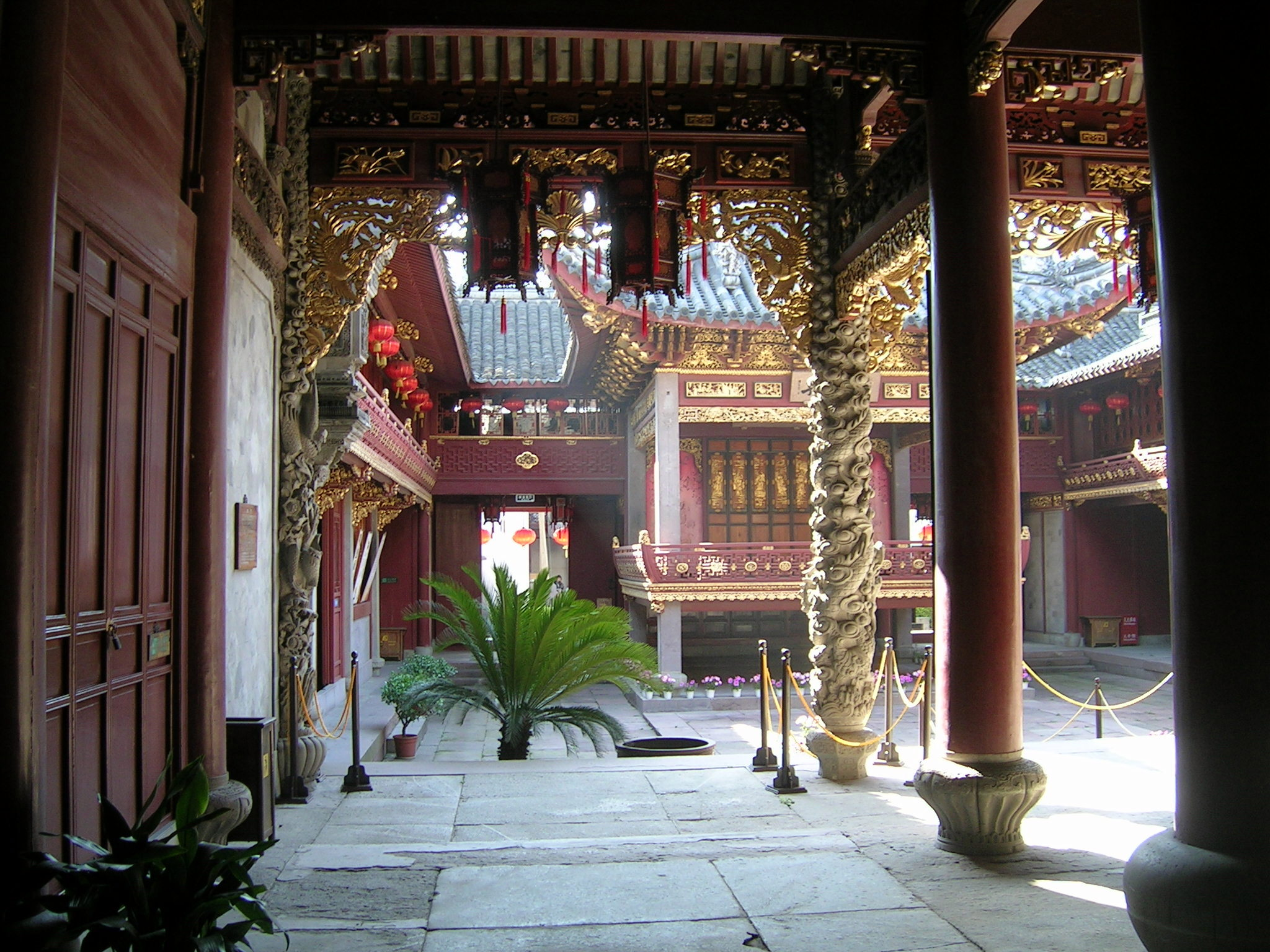
- One of the performance stages

Tianhou Temple
- Traditional Chinese: 甬東天后宮
- Simplified Chinese: 甬东天后宫
- Literal meaning: Palace of the Empress of Heaven of East Ningbo
Transcriptions
Standard Mandarin
- Hanyu Pinyin: Yǒngdōng Tiānhòu Gōng
- Wade–Giles: Yung-tung T‘ien-hou Kung

Tianfei Temple
- Traditional Chinese: 天妃宮
- Simplified Chinese: 天妃宫
- Literal meaning: Palace of the Concubine of Heaven
Transcriptions
Standard Mandarin
- Hanyu Pinyin: Tiānfēi Gōng
- Wade–Giles: T‘ien-fei Kung

The East Zhejiang Maritime Affairs/Folk Custom Museum is a museum located in Yinzhou District in Ningbo, Zhejiang, China. It is located in the Qing'an Guildhall, a reconstructed complex which once housed a temple to the sea-goddess Mazu. Originally built in 1191, the complex was destroyed and rebuilt several times. After its mid-19th century restoration by Ningbo's guild of Fujianese merchants, it was acclaimed as one of the most beautiful temples in China and was used by the merchants as their guildhall. It was destroyed in 1949 as the Communists were fighting the Chinese Civil War, and suffered further harm during the Cultural Revolution, but was repaired from 1997 to 2001. It reopened in June 2001 as a museum dedicated to eastern Zhejiang's maritime history and local arts and crafts.

The museum has been listed as a Major Historical and Cultural Site Protected at the National Level since 2001. The museum's director is Huang Zhesu (黄浙苏).

== Names ==
The diverse roles the location has served have caused it to appear in English accounts under a variety of names, particularly before the adoption of pinyin as a standard romanization scheme.

It was known as the Tianhou Temple, the Tianhou Palace, the Tien-how-kung or Tianhou Gong, the Queen of Heaven Temple, the Temple of the Queen of Heaven, or the Palace of the Empress of Heaven, from one of Mazu's epithets. From its local pronunciation, it also sometimes appears as Tín Heo Kōng. Another of Mazu's epithets sometimes gave it the name Tianfei Gong or Tín Fi Kōng. It is also known as the Sea Goddess Temple.

After it was rebuilt by Fujianese merchants in the mid-19th century, it became known as the Fujianese Guildhall, the Qing'an Guildhall, or Qing'an Assembly Hall. The merchants' involvement in northern maritime (北洋) trade led local Chinese to refer to it as the North Guildhall. In English, it was called the Fukien or Fujian Temple, Fukien Guildhall, Fokien Guild House or Guildhouse, the Guild House of Fokien Merchants, and the Guildhall for the Fujian People or Fukien Hui Kuan.

The present-day museum is sometimes translated as the Museum of Maritime Affairs and Folk Custom in Eastern Zhejiang.

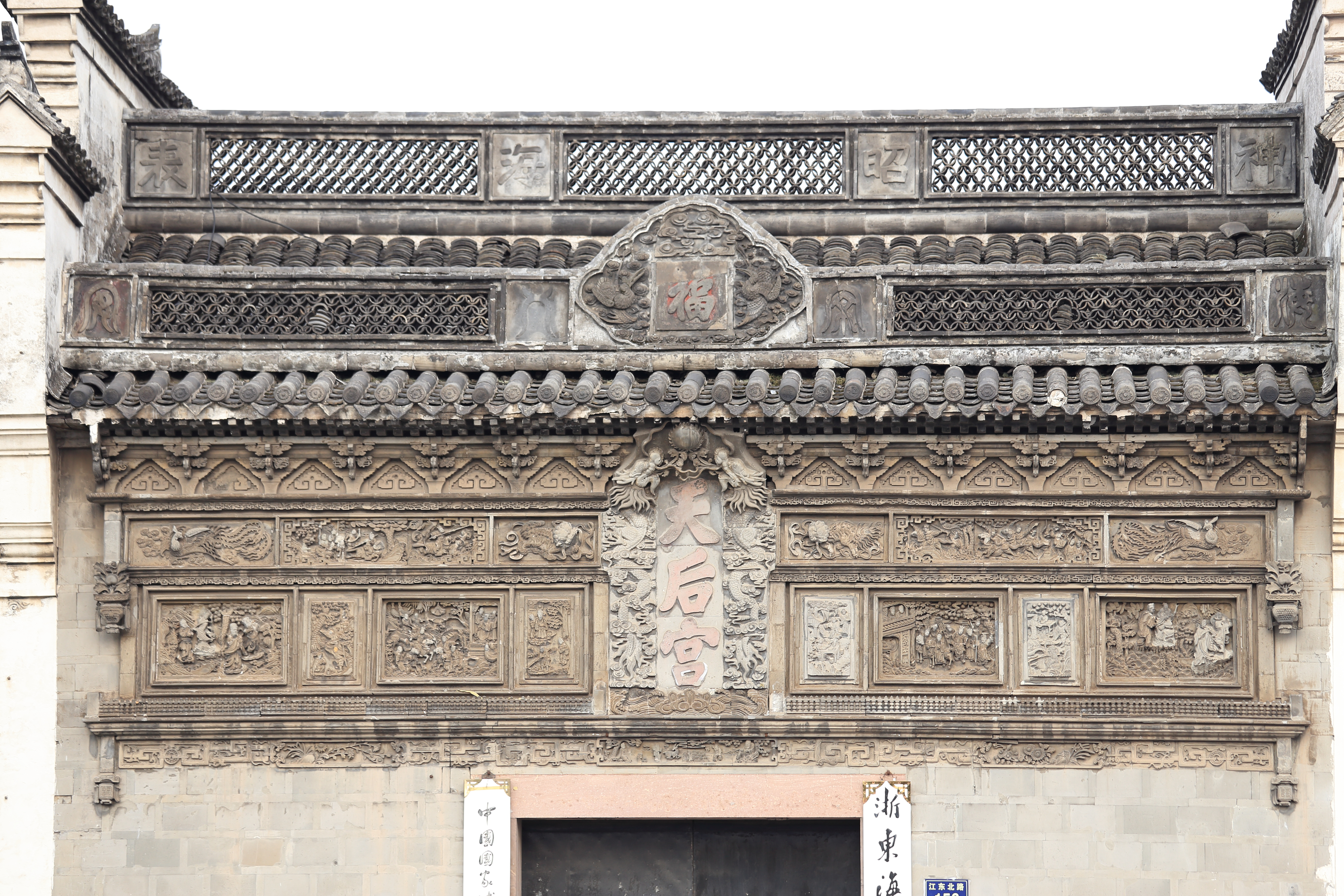
The entrance, with the character for luck above those for "Palace of the Empress of Heaven", surrounded by stone carvings

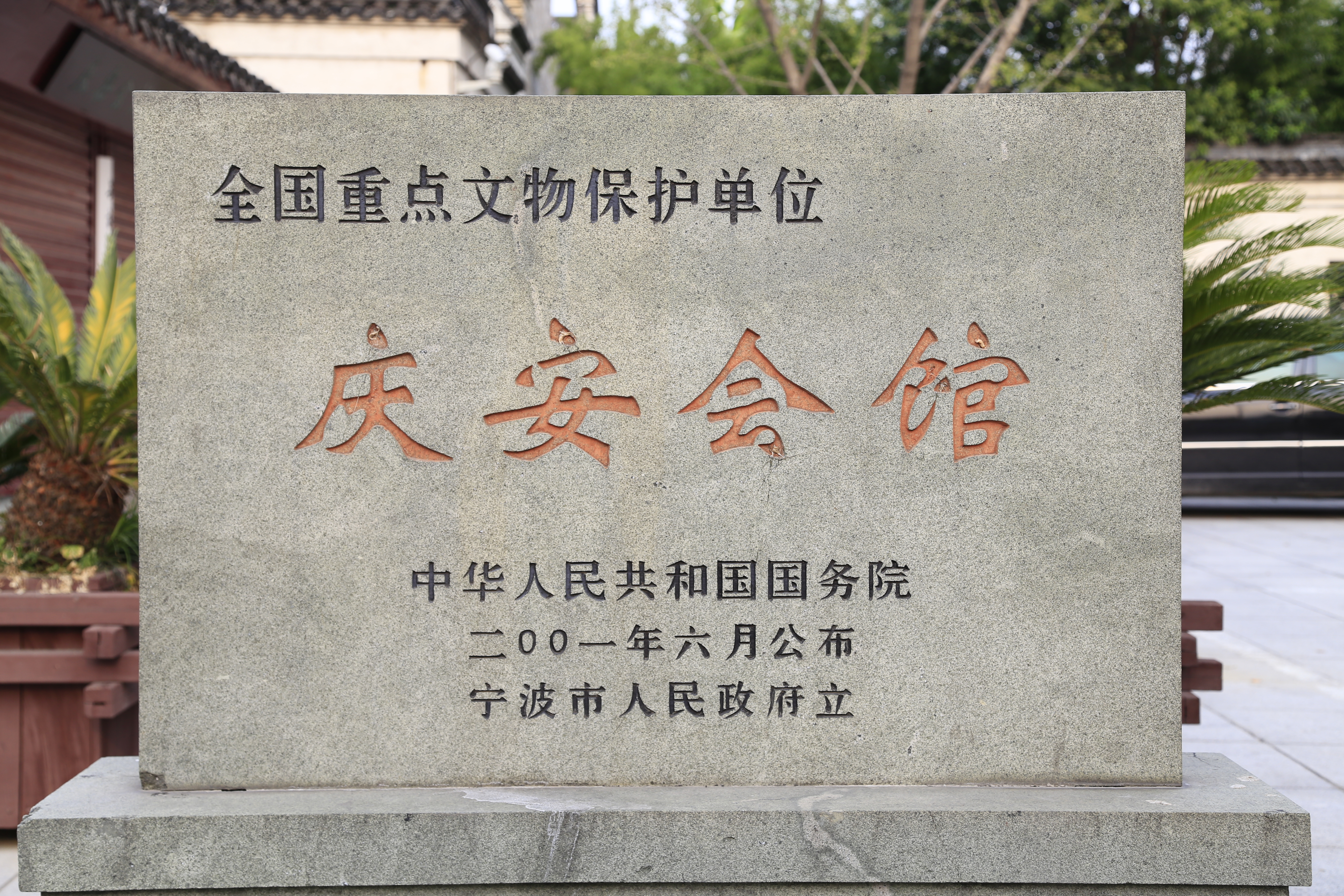
Sign announcing the Qing'an Guild Hall's protected status

== History ==
The complex lies at the heart of present-day Ningbo on the east bank of the Yong River as it is formed by the confluence of the Fenghua and Yuyao rivers. Merchants from Fujian first built it in 1191 under the Southern Song as a temple to the sea-goddess Mazu in her role as the Empress of Heaven ("Tianhou"). (Note: A Chinese legend holds that it was constructed by Koreans who commissioned some vessels from Ningbo's shipwrights but only survived a fierce storm on their way home by praying to Mazu. They then had a temple constructed in her honor the next time they returned to the city.) It lay at the water's edge outside the old city walls, between its East and Bridge gates. It was rebuilt in the 1680s. After Ningbo and Xiamen were reopened to international trade by the treaty ending the First Opium War, nine prosperous merchants—Dong Binru, Feng Yuxiang, Su Qinghe, Fei Lengkan, Fei Fusheng, Sheng Bindeng, Tong Xianglong, and Gu Xuan—rebuilt the temple from 1850 to '53. (Note: Reports that it was constructed in the mid-1880s are mistaken.) Samuel Wells Williams considered it Ningbo's "most elegant and solid building"; at the time, it was covered with well-done calligraphic scrolls and brush drawings, particularly on holidays. John Thomson, an early photographer who traveled extensively along the coasts of the Qing Empire considered it "one of the finest examples of temple architecture in the Empire." He was drawn to its elaborate carvings and careful stylization: "even the minutest details among the ornaments of the building are full of deep significance to native art and the Buddhist or Hindoo mythology" (i.e., Chinese folk religion). The Ningbonese scholar Dong Pei studied the temple's history, inscribing his findings on a tablet preserved at the museum. It was destroyed by the Communists in 1949 during the last phases of their war against Chiang Kai-shek's Nationalists. The site was further damaged during the 1960s' Cultural Revolution, with the second door being completely destroyed.

The temple's ruin was largely left to the elements until Ningbo's Culture and Press Bureau began renovating it in 1997. It reopened to the public as a museum in June 2001, when the State Council designated it among its 5th batch of cultural relics entitled to national protection. It is one of the largest surviving Mazu temples in China and some of the old stone carvings have been preserved and incorporated into the present museum.

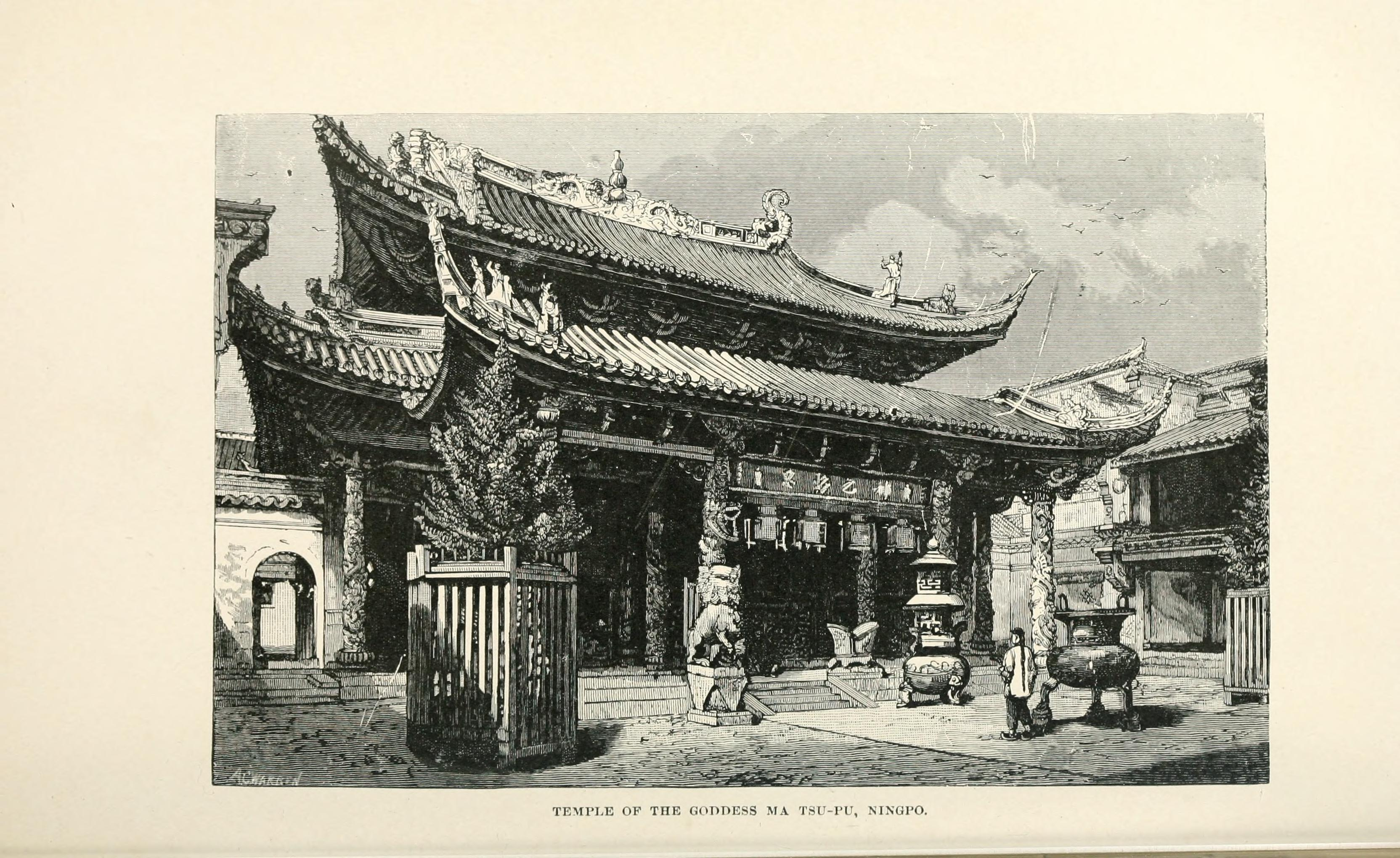
The Great Hall in the early 19th century

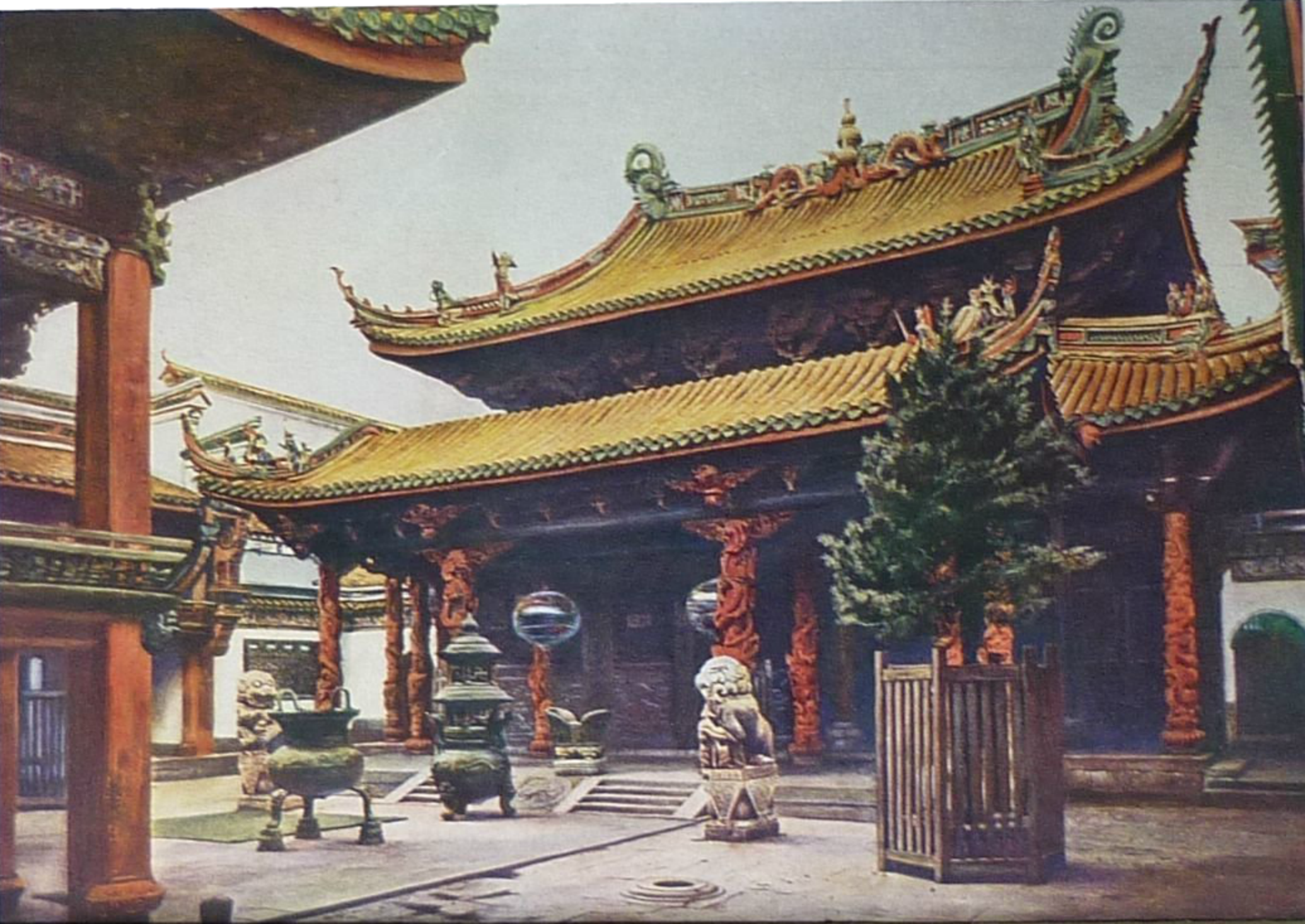
A colorized version of Thomson's c. 1870 photograph

== Architecture ==
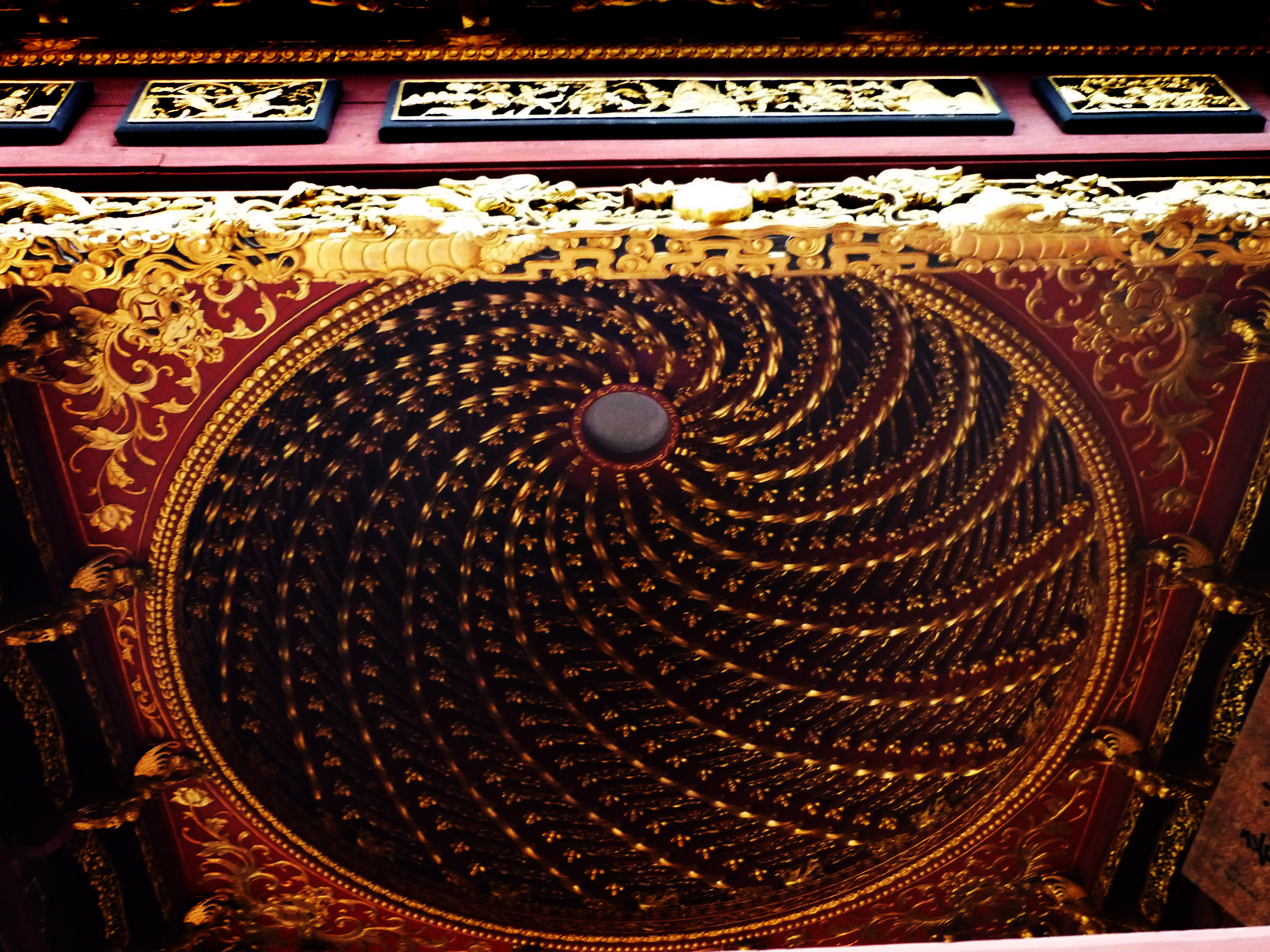
The ceiling decoration above one of the performance stages

The west-facing complex covers 5,000 square meters (1.2 acres) and consists, from front to back, of the Entrance, Second Door, Front Stage, Great Hall, Rear Stages, and Rear Chamber. The second door, having been destroyed during the Cultural Revolution, was reconstructed from historical drawings held by Southeast University. The front stage is 9.5 meters (31 ft) high, 5.2 meters (17 ft) wide, and about as deep, being roughly square. By placing it before the main hall, it was thought that the gods could enjoy watching the opera shows. The walls were designed to produce a resonating effect during performances. The front and rear chambers and the two stages are linked by wing-rooms to one another. The southwest corner has seven side-rooms. The north side includes a separate area for greenery and the north and west sides each have a private courtyard, used as the offices for the guildhall. The style is believed to have been widely influential and copied. To the north of the present complex lies Qing'an Park.

== Exhibits ==
The museum collects regional art concerning Mazu, including large frescos. Its naval exhibits include the wooden steering wheel recovered from the wreck of the SS Jiangya, which struck a mine near the mouth of the Huangpu River in 1948 as Shanghainese were fleeing to Ningbo from the oncoming Communists. Given the high number of stowaways, it is thought that more than 3000 people were killed in the explosion, making it the worst or 2nd-worst maritime disasters in history.

The museum preserves a thousand red wood carvings and a few hundred stone and brick carvings. The 14 tile carvings over the entrance include Twin Dragons Playing with a Pearl, the Eight Immortals Crossing the Sea, "Dragon Tongue Squad", Fishing, Wood-cutting, Farming, and Reading. The beams of the front stage mostly depict stories from the Romance of the Three Kingdoms, including Three Heroes Fighting against Lu Bu and the Empty Fort Strategy. It also includes some carvings of actors and auspicious designs such as Magpies Perching on Plum Trees, dragons, phoenixes, and peonies. The screens are engraved with paintings of six ladies. Curved rails ("Rails for Beauties to Lean On") line three sides of the stage.

For younger children, it has many scale boat models with woven sails and moving parts. One of the models is based upon the western-style gunboat purchased by the temple's 19th-century restorers in 1854 to suppress pirate attacks on their vessels.

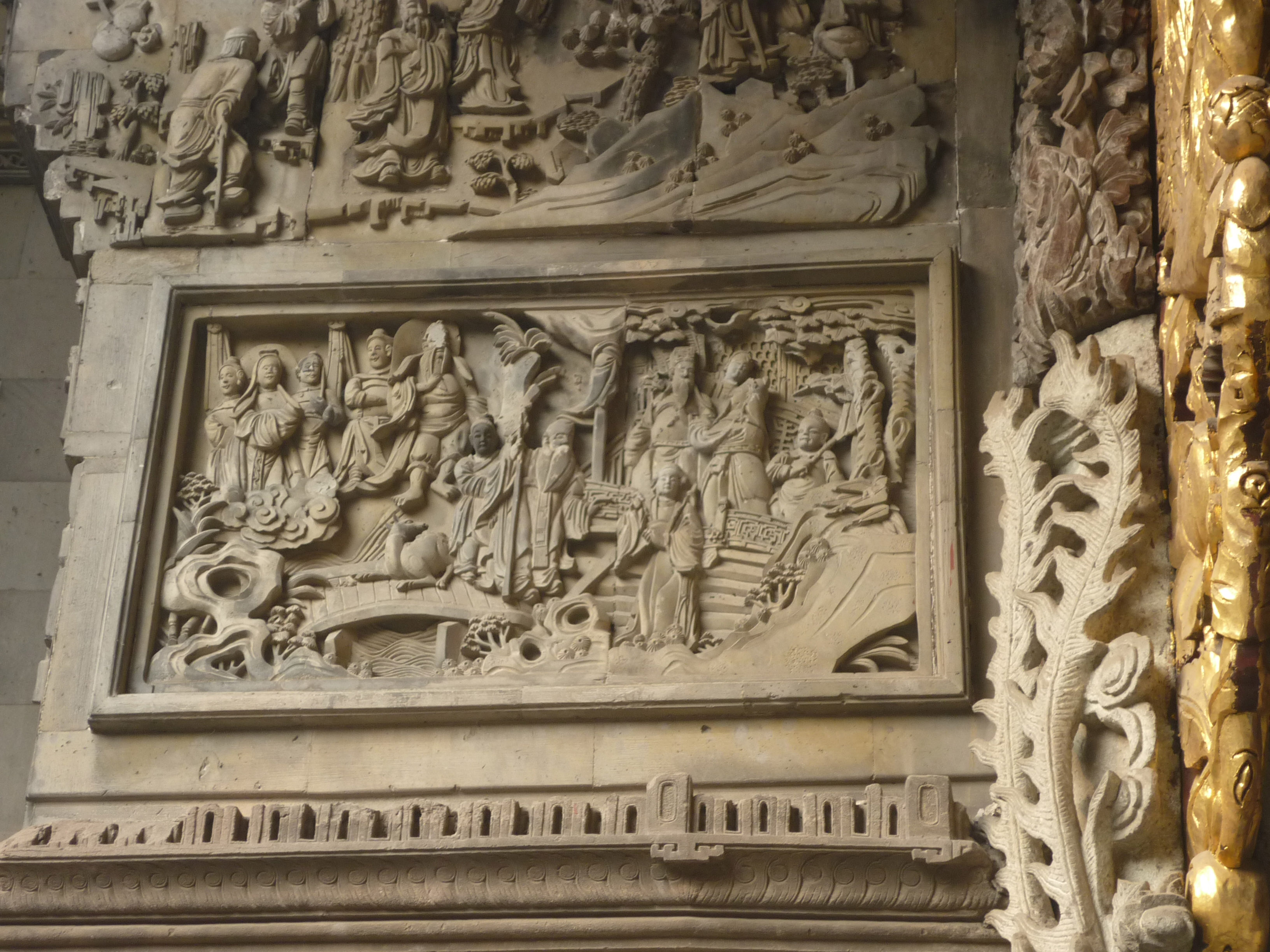
Stone carvings at the EZMAFCM

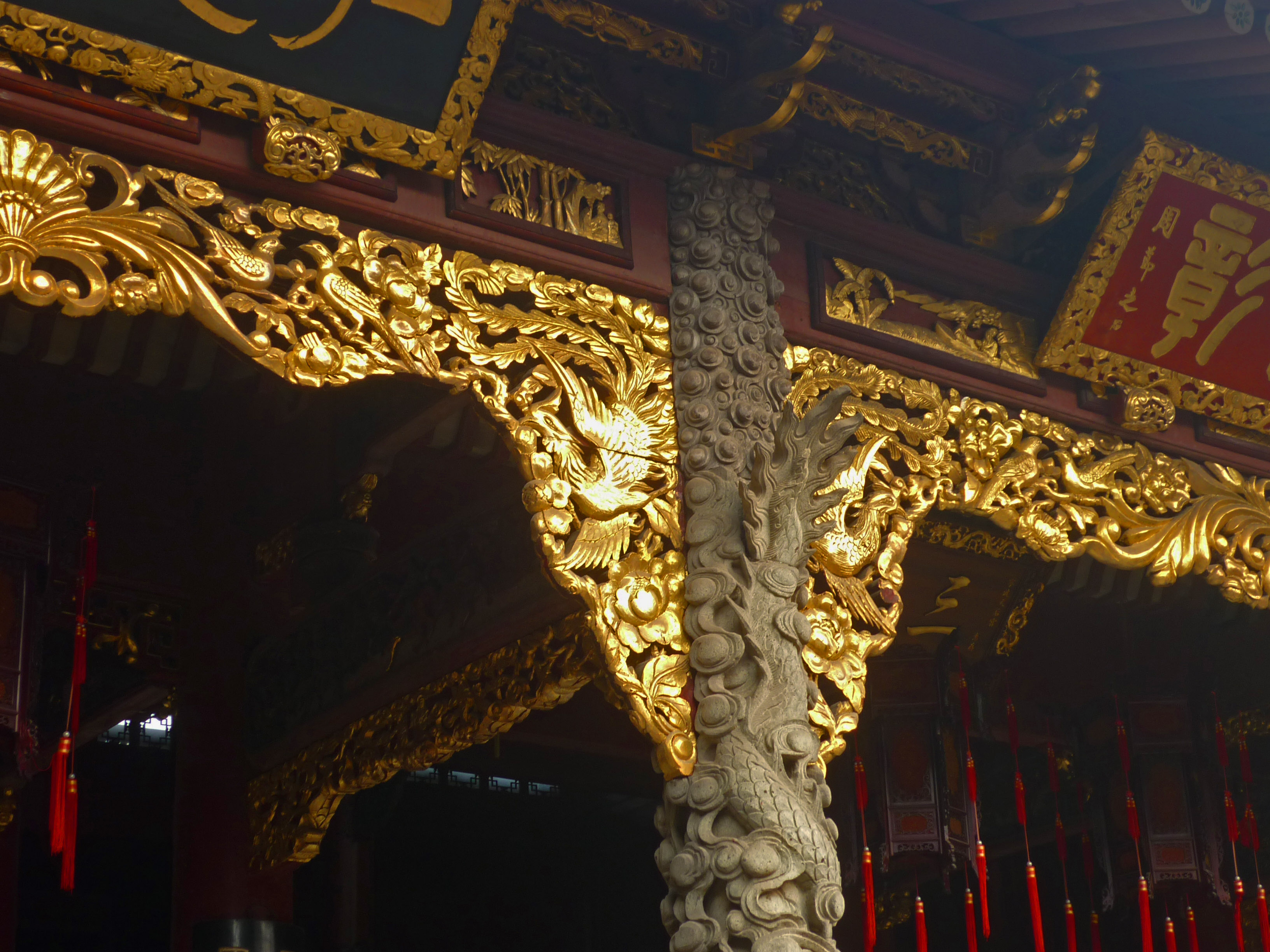
Gilt woodcarving at the EZMAFCM

== Gallery ==
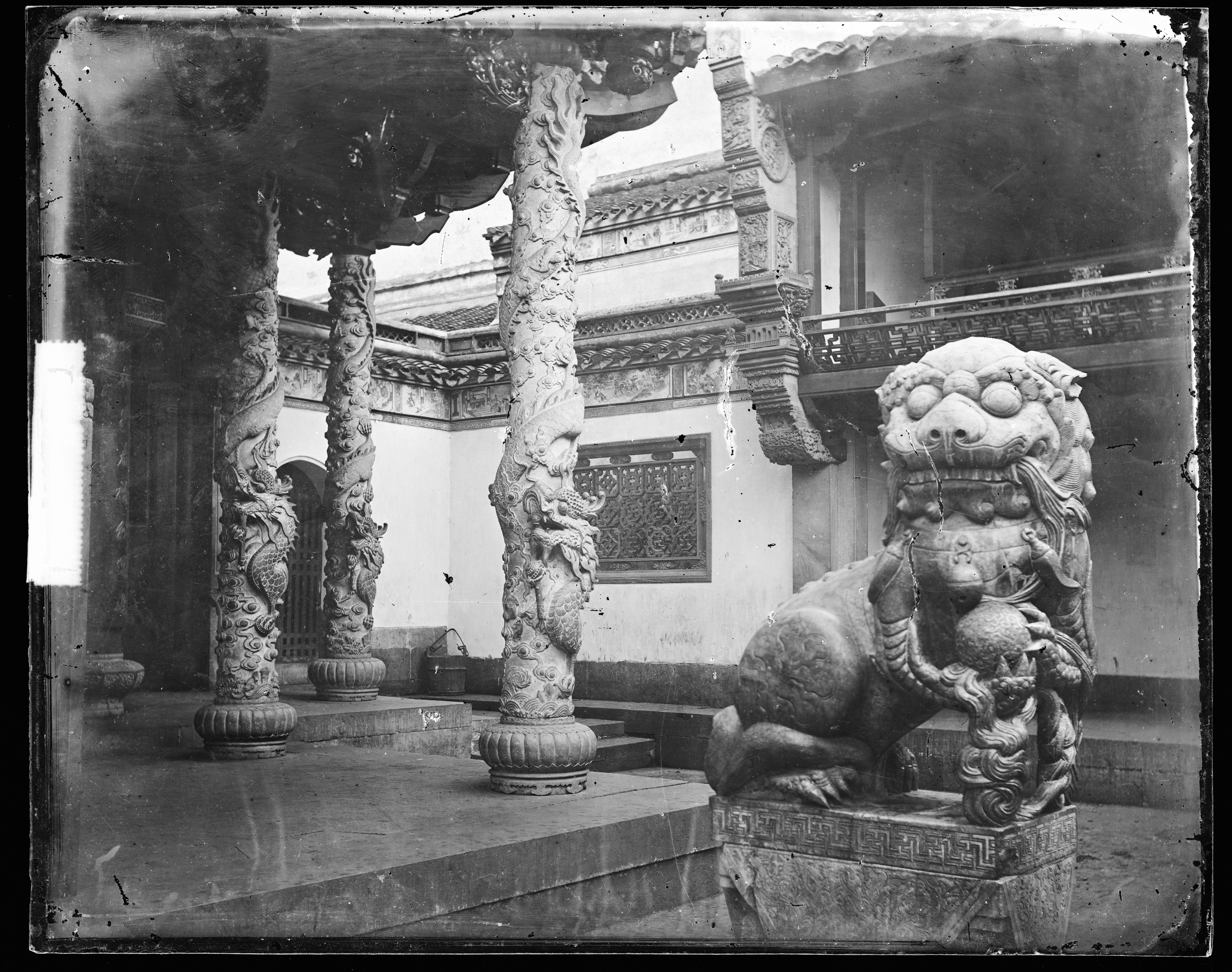
The right foo dog which protected the temple's great hall, c. 1870

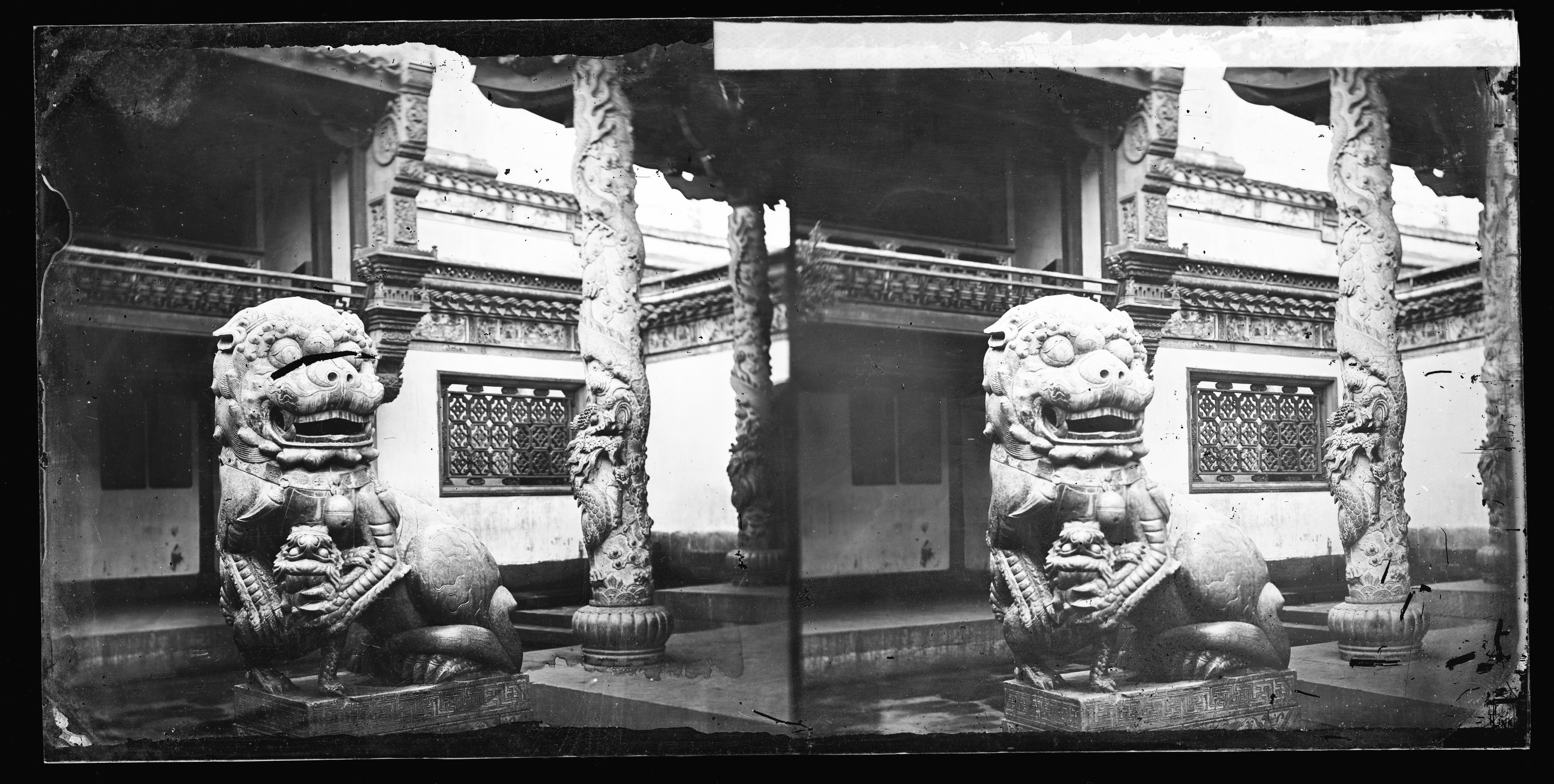
A stereogram of the left foo dog which protected the temple's great hall, c. 1870

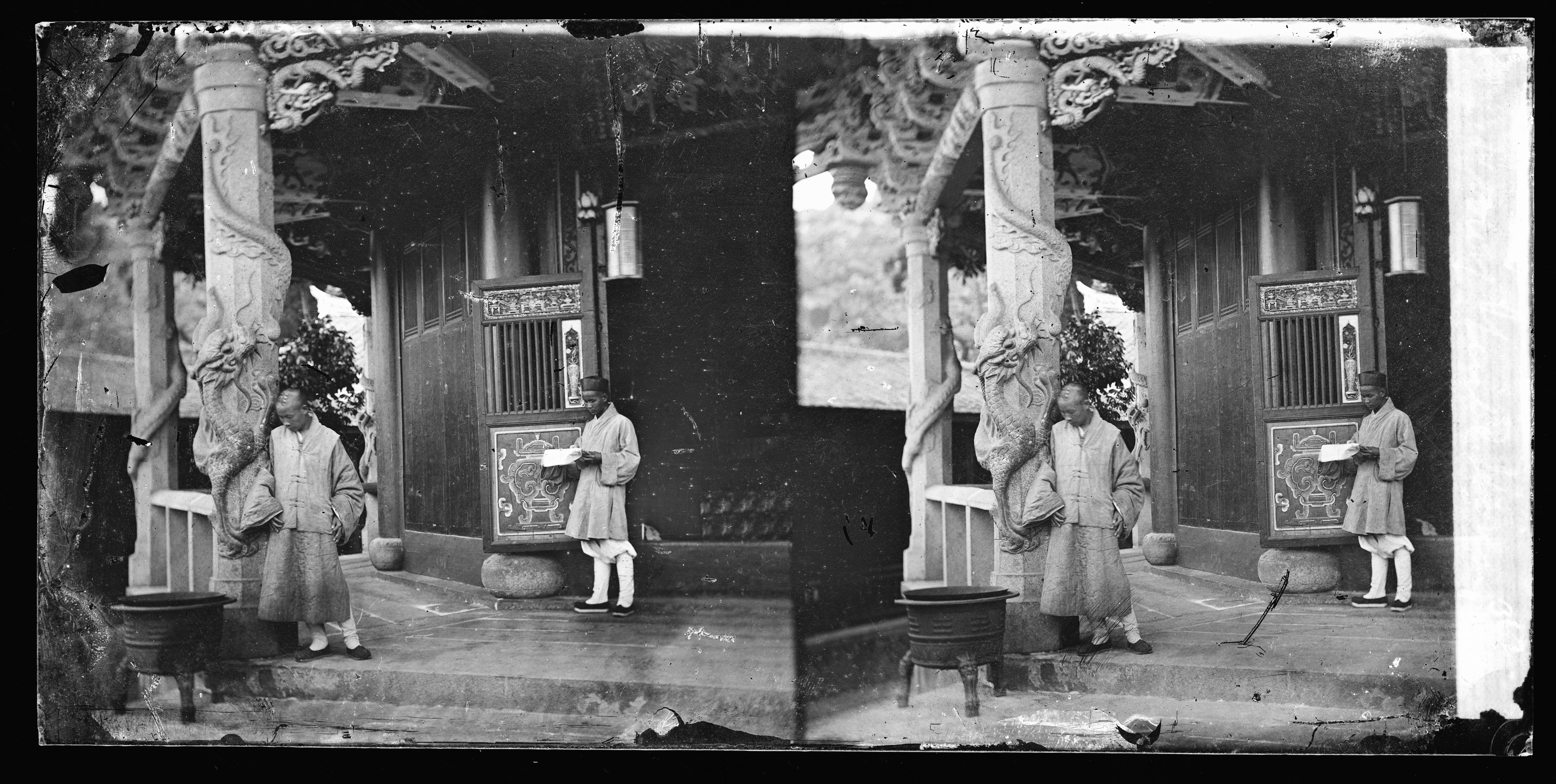
A stereogram of a porch c. 1870

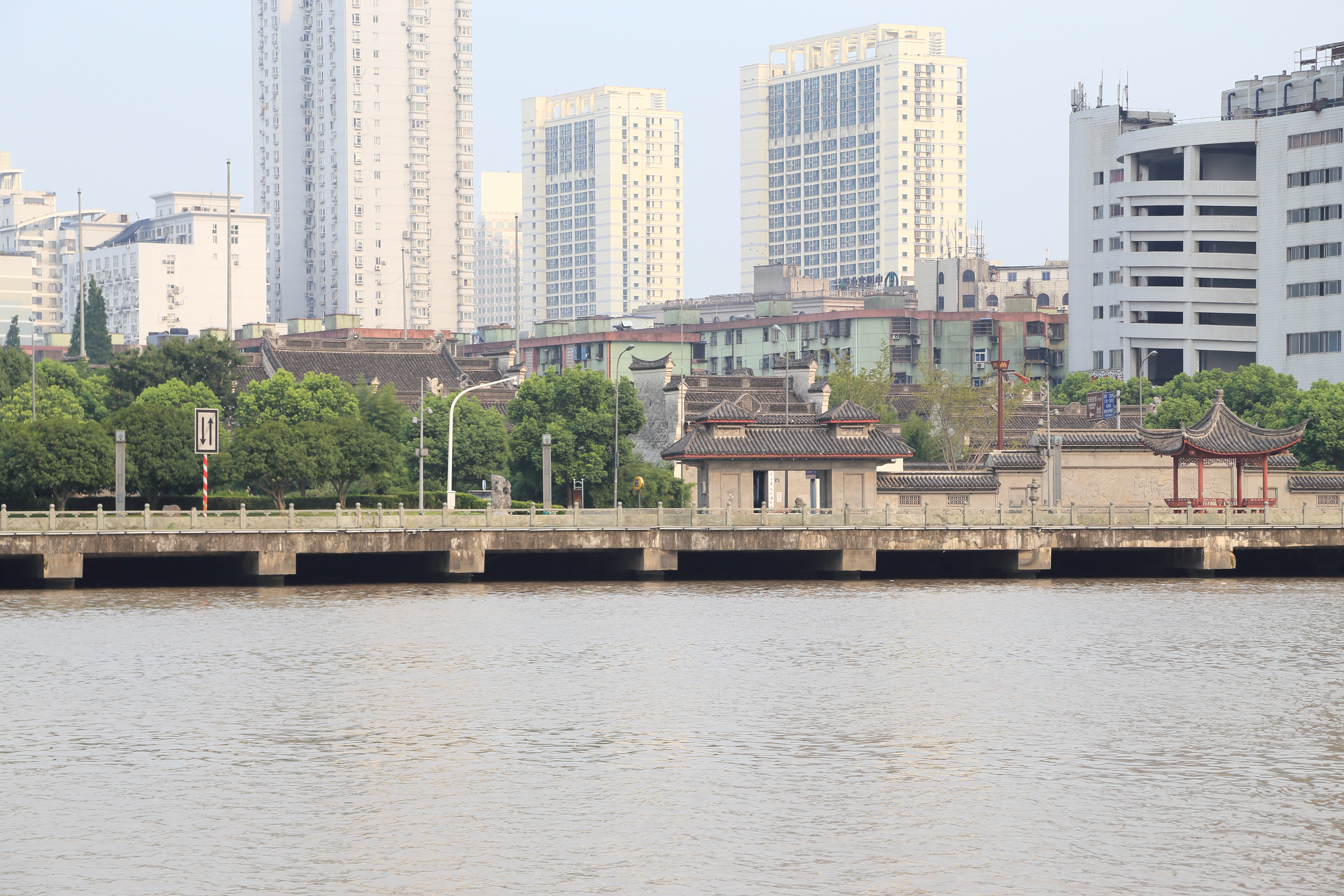
The present-day complex from across the Yong River

== See also ==
- Major national historical and cultural sites in Zhejiang
