= 122nd meridian east =

Line of longitude

122nd meridian east (interactive map)

The meridian 122° east of Greenwich is a line of longitude that extends from the North Pole across the Arctic Ocean, Asia, the Pacific Ocean, the Indian Ocean, Australia, the Southern Ocean, and Antarctica to the South Pole.

The 122nd meridian east forms a great circle with the 58th meridian west.

== From Pole to Pole ==
Starting at the North Pole and heading south to the South Pole, the 122nd meridian east passes through:

Co-ordinates	Country, territory or sea	Notes
90°0′N 122°0′E	Arctic Ocean	
78°8′N 122°0′E	Laptev Sea	
72°57′N 122°0′E	Russia	Sakha Republic; Amur Oblast — from 56°46′N 122°0′E; Zabaykalsky Krai — for about 3 km from 55°12′N 122°0′E; Amur Oblast — from 55°11′N 122°0′E; Zabaykalsky Krai — from 54°33′N 122°0′E; Amur Oblast — from 54°24′N 122°0′E; Zabaykalsky Krai — from 53°32′N 122°0′E
53°25′N 122°0′E	China	Heilongjiang; Inner Mongolia — 52°11′N 122°0′E; Jilin — 45°57′N 122°0′E; Inner Mongolia — 45°30′N 122°0′E; Liaoning — 42°42′N 122°0′E
40°45′N 122°0′E	Yellow Sea	Liaodong Bay
40°7′N 122°0′E	China	Liaoning — Liaodong Peninsula
39°4′N 122°0′E	Yellow Sea	
37°30′N 122°0′E	China	Shandong — Shandong Peninsula
36°59′N 122°0′E	Yellow Sea	
33°17′N 122°0′E	East China Sea	
31°13′N 122°0′E	China	Shanghai — Jiuduansha (intertidal)
31°08′N 122°0′E	East China Sea	Passing through the Donghai Bridge (at 30°40′N 122°0′E)
30°9′N 122°0′E	China	Zhejiang — Zhoushan Island, mainland, and minor islands
29°46′N 122°0′E	East China Sea	
25°1′N 122°0′E	Republic of China	Easternmost point of the island of Taiwan — claimed by China
25°0′N 122°0′E	East China Sea	
25°0′N 122°0′E	Pacific Ocean	Philippine Sea — passing just east of islands in the Batanes group, Philippines (at 20°55′N 121°56′E)
20°29′N 122°0′E	Philippines	Batan Island
20°27′N 122°0′E	Pacific Ocean	Philippine Sea — passing just east of the Babuyan Islands, Philippines (at 19°32′N 121°59′E)
18°17′N 122°0′E	Philippines	Island of Luzon
16°2′N 122°0′E	Pacific Ocean	Philippine Sea
15°2′N 122°0′E	Philippines	Island of Polillo
14°40′N 122°0′E	Lamon Bay	
14°10′N 122°0′E	Philippines	Islands of Alabat and Luzon
13°48′N 122°0′E	Tayabas Bay	
13°31′N 122°0′E	Philippines	Island of Marinduque
13°12′N 122°0′E	Tablas Strait	Passing just west of the island of Banton, Philippines (at 12°59′N 122°2′E); Passing just west of the island of Simara, Philippines (at 12°48′N 122°1′E)
12°36′N 122°0′E	Philippines	Island of Tablas
12°8′N 122°0′E	Sibuyan Sea	
11°55′N 122°0′E	Philippines	Island of Panay
11°45′N 122°0′E	Sulu Sea	
10°57′N 122°0′E	Philippines	Island of Panay
10°26′N 122°0′E	Sulu Sea	
7°15′N 122°0′E	Philippines	Island of Mindanao
6°56′N 122°0′E	Basilan Strait	
6°44′N 122°0′E	Philippines	Island of Basilan and the Tapiantana Islands
6°17′N 122°0′E	Celebes Sea	
1°2′N 122°0′E	Indonesia	Island of Sulawesi (Minahassa Peninsula)
0°28′N 122°0′E	Gulf of Tomini	
0°21′S 122°0′E	Indonesia	Togian Islands
0°25′S 122°0′E	Gulf of Tomini	
0°56′S 122°0′E	Indonesia	Island of Sulawesi (East Peninsula)
1°38′S 122°0′E	Banda Sea	
2°37′S 122°0′E	Indonesia	Island of Sulawesi (South-East Peninsula
4°53′S 122°0′E	Banda Sea	
5°9′S 122°0′E	Indonesia	Island of Kabaena
5°31′S 122°0′E	Banda Sea	Passing just east of the Selayar Islands, Indonesia (at 7°22′S 121°50′E)
7°29′S 122°0′E	Flores Sea	
8°26′S 122°0′E	Indonesia	Island of Flores
8°48′S 122°0′E	Savu Sea	
10°27′S 122°0′E	Indonesia	Island of Savu
10°28′S 122°0′E	Indian Ocean	
13°36′S 122°0′E	Australia	Western Australia — Seringapatam Reef
13°42′S 122°0′E	Indian Ocean	Passing just east of Scott Reef, Western Australia, Australia (at 14°7′S 121°59′E)
18°24′S 122°0′E	Australia	Western Australia — mainland and the Archipelago of the Recherche
34°8′S 122°0′E	Indian Ocean	Australian authorities consider this to be part of the Southern Ocean
60°0′S 122°0′E	Southern Ocean	
66°11′S 122°0′E	Antarctica	Australian Antarctic Territory, claimed by Australia

== See also ==
- 121st meridian east
- 123rd meridian east
