= SS Kiangya =

Chinese passenger steamship

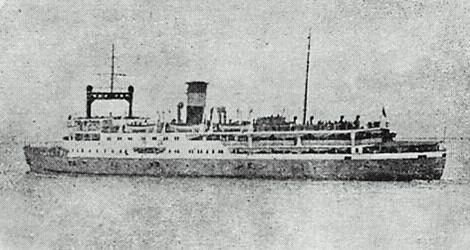

History

Republic of China
- Name: SS Kiangya
- Operator: Shanghai Merchants Group
- Completed: 1939
- Fate: Retired 1983
- Notes: Sank in 1948 after an internal explosion
- Coordinates: 31°15′N 121°47′E

General characteristics
- Type: Steamship
- Displacement: 2,100 tons
- Capacity: 1,186

SS Kiangya or Jiangya (traditional Chinese: 江亞輪; simplified Chinese: 江亚轮; pinyin: Jiāngyà Lún) was a Chinese passenger steamship that was destroyed in an explosion near the mouth of the Huangpu River 50 miles (80 km) north of Shanghai on 3 or 4 December 1948. Her wreck was cleared from the channel in 1956 and her hull refurbished, re-entering service. She was renamed the SS Dongfang Hong 8 (traditional Chinese: 東方紅8; simplified Chinese: 东方红8; pinyin: Dōngfāng Hóng Bā; lit. 'The East is Red #8') during the Cultural Revolution and retired during modernisations in 1983.

== Pre-disaster service ==
The Kiangya was one of eight ships operated by the Shanghai Merchants Group and the sister ship of the SS Kiangking (Chinese: 江静轮; pinyin: Jiāngjìng Lún). She had a displacement of 2,100 tons.

== Sinking ==
At the time of her explosion during the Chinese Civil War, she was bound for Ningbo from Shanghai's Shiliupu Dock. She was packed with refugees fleeing the advancing Communists. She probably hit a mine, possibly laid by the Imperial Japanese Navy during the Second World War. The exact death toll is unknown. Although her official capacity was 1,186 passengers, the manifest listed 2,150 and she was almost certainly carrying many additional stowaways. Rescuers were unaware of the disaster for some hours. With an estimated death toll of between 2,750 and as many as 4,000 people, with 700 survivors being picked up by other vessels, it remains the second deadliest peacetime maritime disaster in history.

== Salvage and later service as Dongfang Hong 8 ==
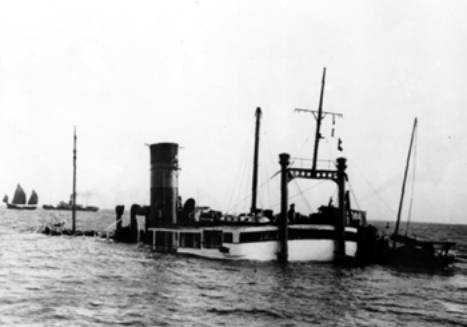
The wreck of SS Kiangya

The hull of the Kiangya had broken in half but, in 1956, the two pieces were removed in order to dredge that area of the river. The process took 160 days, after which the pieces were moved to the Jiangnan Shipyard and refurbished. She re-entered service at Shanghai's Shiliupu Dock on 4 February 1959, after which she served as a local ferry and for shipping between Shanghai and Wuhan. She was renamed the Dongfang Hong 8 in November 1966 during the Cultural Revolution. She was retired in 1983. During shipbreaking operations in June 2000, a major oil fire broke out.

== Legacy ==
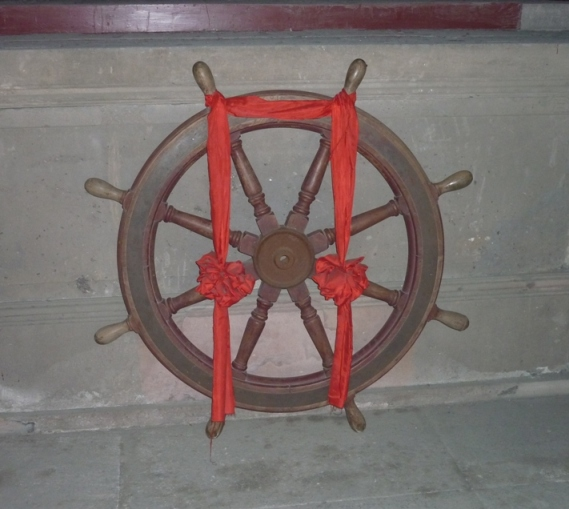
The recovered wheel of the Kiangya at the EZMAFCM

The ship's helm is preserved at the East Zhejiang Maritime Affairs and Folk Customs Museum in Ningbo.

The ship gave her name to Jiangya Nansha, one of the component shoals of Jiuduansha off eastern Shanghai.

== See also ==
- List of maritime disasters
