= 121st meridian east =

Line of longitude

121st meridian east (interactive map)

The meridian 121° east of Greenwich is a line of longitude that extends from the North Pole across the Arctic Ocean, Asia, the Pacific Ocean, the Indian Ocean, Australia, the Southern Ocean, and Antarctica to the South Pole.

The 121st meridian east forms a great circle with the 59th meridian west.

== From Pole to Pole ==
Starting at the North Pole and heading south to the South Pole, the 121st meridian east passes through:

Co-ordinates	Country, territory or sea	Notes
90°0′N 121°0′E	Arctic Ocean	
78°15′N 121°0′E	Laptev Sea	
72°56′N 121°0′E	Russia	Sakha Republic; Amur Oblast — from 57°3′N 121°0′E; Zabaykalsky Krai — from 56°3′N 122°0′E
53°17′N 121°0′E	China	Inner Mongolia; Liaoning – from 42°15′N 121°0′E
40°50′N 121°0′E	Yellow Sea	Liaodong Bay; Passing just west of the Liaodong Peninsula, Liaoning, China (at 38°55′N 121°5′E); Bohai Sea
37°44′N 121°0′E	China	Shandong – Shandong Peninsula
36°36′N 121°0′E	Yellow Sea	
33°17′N 121°0′E	East China Sea	
32°32′N 121°0′E	China	Jiangsu; Shanghai – from 31°8′N 121°0′E; Zhejiang – from 30°50′N 121°0′E
30°34′N 121°0′E	Hangzhou Bay	
32°32′N 121°0′E	China	Zhejiang
28°7′N 121°0′E	East China Sea	
25°20′N 121°0′E	Taiwan Strait	
24°57′N 121°0′E	Republic of China	Island of Taiwan – claimed by China
22°35′N 121°0′E	Pacific Ocean	Philippine Sea
21°48′N 121°0′E	South China Sea	
18°36′N 121°0′E	Philippines	Island of Luzon – passing through Manila (at 14°35′N 121°0′E) - passing through Manila Airport
13°47′N 121°0′E	Isla Verde Passage	
13°27′N 121°0′E	Philippines	Island of Mindoro
12°25′N 121°0′E	Sulu Sea	Passing through the Cuyo Islands, Philippines (at 11°0′N 121°0′E); Passing just west of the Cagayan Islands, Philippines (at 11°0′N 121°0′E)
6°11′N 121°0′E	Philippines	Island of Jolo and smaller neighbouring islands
5°40′N 121°0′E	Celebes Sea	
1°21′N 121°0′E	Indonesia	Island of Sulawesi (Minahassa Peninsula)
0°26′N 121°0′E	Gulf of Tomini	
1°25′S 121°0′E	Indonesia	Island of Sulawesi
2°41′S 121°0′E	Gulf of Boni	
3°15′S 121°0′E	Indonesia	Island of Sulawesi
3°39′S 121°0′E	Gulf of Boni	
5°25′S 121°0′E	Banda Sea	
7°17′S 121°0′E	Indonesia	Selayar Islands
7°20′S 121°0′E	Flores Sea	
8°23′S 121°0′E	Indonesia	Island of Flores
8°58′S 121°0′E	Savu Sea	
10°39′S 121°0′E	Indian Ocean	
19°36′S 121°0′E	Australia	Western Australia
33°52′S 121°0′E	Indian Ocean	Australian authorities consider this to be part of the Southern Ocean
60°0′S 121°0′E	Southern Ocean	
66°48′S 121°0′E	Antarctica	Australian Antarctic Territory, claimed by Australia

== See also ==
- 120th meridian east
- 122nd meridian east
