= 59th Infantry Division (Russian Empire) =

- 59-я пехотная дивизия
- Active: 1914–1918
- Country: Russian Empire
- Branch: Russian Imperial Army
- Role: Infantry

The 59th Infantry Division (Russian: 59-я пехотная дивизия, 59-ya Pekhotnaya Diviziya) was an infantry formation of the Russian Imperial Army.

== Organization ==
- 1st Brigade
  - 233rd Infantry Regiment
  - 234th Infantry Regiment
- 2nd Brigade
  - 235th Infantry Regiment
  - 236th Infantry Regiment
