= 59th Brigade =

59th Brigade or 59th Infantry Brigade may refer to:

== India ==
- 59th Indian Brigade of the British Indian Army in the First World War

== Russia ==
- 59th Motor Rifle Brigade

== Spain ==
- 59th Mixed Brigade of the Spanish Republican Army

== Ukraine ==
- 59th Assault Brigade, also known as the 59th Motorized Brigade, Ukraine

== United Kingdom ==
- 59th Anti-Aircraft Brigade
- 59th Brigade (United Kingdom)

=== Artillery units ===
- 59th Brigade, Royal Field Artillery, of the British Army in the First World War
- 59th (Essex Regiment) Anti-Aircraft Brigade, Royal Artillery
- 59th (Home Counties) (Cinque Ports) Brigade, Royal Field Artillery, of the British Army after the First World War
- 59th (4th West Lancashire) Medium Brigade, Royal Garrison Artillery

== United States ==
- 59th Ordnance Brigade of the United States Army

== See also ==
- 59th Division (disambiguation)
- 59th Regiment (disambiguation)
