= 57th meridian east =

Line of longitude

57th meridian east

The meridian 57° east of Greenwich is a line of longitude that extends from the North Pole across the Arctic Ocean, Europe, Asia, the Indian Ocean, the Southern Ocean, and Antarctica to the South Pole.

The 57th meridian east forms a great circle with the 123rd meridian west.

== From Pole to Pole ==
Starting at the North Pole and heading south to the South Pole, the 57th meridian east passes through:

Co-ordinates	Country, territory or sea	Notes
90°0′N 57°0′E	Arctic Ocean	
81°32′N 57°0′E	Russia	Islands of Karl-Alexander, Jackson, Payer, Ziegler, Salisbury, and MacKlintok, Franz Josef Land
80°3′N 57°0′E	Barents Sea	
75°22′N 57°0′E	Russia	Severny Island, Novaya Zemlya
73°19′N 57°0′E	Kara Sea	
70°51′N 57°0′E	Russia	Yuzhny Island, Novaya Zemlya
70°29′N 57°0′E	Barents Sea	Pechora Sea
68°32′N 57°0′E	Russia	
51°3′N 57°0′E	Kazakhstan	
45°14′N 57°0′E	Uzbekistan	
41°54′N 57°0′E	Turkmenistan	
41°36′N 57°0′E	Uzbekistan	
41°15′N 57°0′E	Turkmenistan	
38°10′N 57°0′E	Iran	
26°50′N 57°0′E	Gulf of Oman	
24°4′N 57°0′E	Oman	
18°50′N 57°0′E	Indian Ocean	Passing just east of the Agalega Islands, Mauritius; Passing just west of the island of Mauritius
60°0′S 57°0′E	Southern Ocean	
66°27′S 57°0′E	Antarctica	Australian Antarctic Territory, claimed by Australia
66°42′S 57°0′E	Southern Ocean	
66°59′S 57°0′E	Antarctica	Australian Antarctic Territory, claimed by Australia

== See also ==
- 56th meridian east
- 58th meridian east
