= 123rd meridian west =

Line of longitude

123rd meridian west

The meridian 123° west of Greenwich is a line of longitude that extends from the North Pole across the Arctic Ocean, North America, the Pacific Ocean, the Southern Ocean, and Antarctica to the South Pole.

The 123rd meridian west forms a great circle with the 57th meridian east.

== From Pole to Pole ==
Starting at the North Pole and heading south to the South Pole, the 123rd meridian west passes through:

Co-ordinates	Country, territory or sea	Notes
90°0′N 123°0′W	Arctic Ocean	
76°6′N 123°0′W	Canada	Northwest Territories — Prince Patrick Island
76°1′N 123°0′W	M'Clure Strait	
74°27′N 123°0′W	Canada	Northwest Territories — Banks Island
71°5′N 123°0′W	Amundsen Gulf	
69°49′N 123°0′W	Canada	Northwest Territories — passing through the Great Bear Lake; British Columbia — from 60°0′N 123°0′W, passing just east of Vancouver (at 49°15′N 123°0′W)
49°4′N 123°0′W	Boundary Bay	
48°40′N 123°0′W	United States	Washington — Orcas Island, Shaw Island and San Juan Island
48°27′N 123°0′W	Strait of Juan de Fuca	
48°5′N 123°0′W	United States	Washington — Olympic Peninsula
47°35′N 123°0′W	Hood Canal	
47°32′N 123°0′W	United States	Washington — Kitsap Peninsula
47°23′N 123°0′W	Hood Canal	
47°22′N 123°0′W	United States	Washington; Oregon — from 46°8′N 123°0′W, passing through Salem (at 44°56′N 123°0′W); California — from 42°1′N 123°0′W
38°18′N 123°0′W	Pacific Ocean	
38°1′N 123°0′W	United States	California — Point Reyes
38°0′N 123°0′W	Pacific Ocean	
37°42′N 123°0′W	United States	California — Southeast Farallon Island
37°42′N 123°0′W	Pacific Ocean	
60°0′S 123°0′W	Southern Ocean	
73°41′S 123°0′W	Antarctica	Unclaimed territory

== See also ==
- 122nd meridian west
- 124th meridian west
