= 123rd meridian east =

Line of longitude

123rd meridian east (interactive map)

The meridian 123° east of Greenwich is a line of longitude that extends from the North Pole across the Arctic Ocean, Asia, the Pacific Ocean, the Indian Ocean, Australia, the Southern Ocean, and Antarctica to the South Pole.

The 123rd meridian east forms a great circle with the 57th meridian west.

== From Pole to Pole ==
Starting at the North Pole and heading south to the South Pole, the 123rd meridian east passes through:

Co-ordinates	Country, territory or sea	Notes
90°0′N 123°0′E	Arctic Ocean	
78°2′N 123°0′E	Laptev Sea	
72°57′N 123°0′E	Russia	Sakha Republic; Amur Oblast — from 56°31′N 123°0′E
53°30′N 123°0′E	China	Heilongjiang; Inner Mongolia — from 51°17′N 123°0′E; Heilongjiang — from 47°43′N 123°0′E; Inner Mongolia — from 46°42′N 123°0′E; Jilin — from 46°6′N 123°0′E; Inner Mongolia — from 44°29′N 123°0′E; Liaoning — from 42°44′N 123°0′E
39°40′N 123°0′E	Yellow Sea	Passing just east of the Shandong Peninsula, Shandong, China (at 37°23′N 122°42′E)
33°17′N 123°0′E	East China Sea	Passing just east of the Zhoushan archipelago, Zhejiang, China (at 30°25′N 122°56′E)
24°28′N 123°0′E	Japan	Okinawa Prefecture — island of Yonaguni
24°26′N 123°0′E	Pacific Ocean	Philippine Sea
14°7′N 123°0′E	Philippines	Island of Luzon
13°31′N 123°0′E	Ragay Gulf	
13°9′N 123°0′E	Philippines	Island of Burias
13°0′N 123°0′E	Sibuyan Sea	
11°30′N 123°0′E	Philippines	Island of Panay
11°5′N 123°0′E	Guimaras Strait	
10°55′N 123°0′E	Philippines	Island of Negros
9°3′N 123°0′E	Sulu Sea	
8°25′N 123°0′E	Philippines	Island of Mindanao
7°28′N 123°0′E	Celebes Sea	
0°58′N 123°0′E	Indonesia	Island of Sulawesi (Minahassa Peninsula)
0°30′N 123°0′E	Gulf of Tomini	
0°37′S 123°0′E	Indonesia	Island of Sulawesi (East Peninsula)
0°54′S 123°0′E	Peleng Straits	
1°12′S 123°0′E	Indonesia	Island of Peleng
1°31′S 123°0′E	Banda Sea	Passing just west of the island of Manui, Indonesia (at 3°35′S 123°2′E)
4°0′S 123°0′E	Indonesia	Island of Wowoni
4°12′S 123°0′E	Banda Sea	Passing just east of the island of Sulawesi, Indonesia (at 4°19′S 122°54′E)
4°23′S 123°0′E	Indonesia	Island of Buton
4°56′S 123°0′E	Banda Sea	
5°9′S 123°0′E	Indonesia	Island of Buton
5°23′S 123°0′E	Banda Sea	
8°17′S 123°0′E	Indonesia	Islands of Flores, Adonara and Solor
8°30′S 123°0′E	Savu Sea	
10°44′S 123°0′E	Indonesia	Island of Rote
10°52′S 123°0′E	Indian Ocean	
12°14′S 123°0′E	Australia	Ashmore and Cartier Islands
12°17′S 123°0′E	Indian Ocean	
16°23′S 123°0′E	Australia	Western Australia
33°52′S 123°0′E	Indian Ocean	Australian authorities consider this to be part of the Southern Ocean
60°0′S 123°0′E	Southern Ocean	
66°40′S 123°0′E	Antarctica	Australian Antarctic Territory, claimed by Australia

== See also ==
- 122nd meridian east
- 124th meridian east
