= 124th meridian west =

Line of longitude

124th meridian west

The meridian 124° west of Greenwich is a line of longitude that extends from the North Pole across the Arctic Ocean, North America, the Pacific Ocean, the Southern Ocean, and Antarctica to the South Pole.

The 124th meridian west forms a great circle with the 56th meridian east.

== From Pole to Pole ==
Starting at the North Pole and heading south to the South Pole, the 124th meridian west passes through:

Co-ordinates	Country, territory or sea	Notes
90°0′N 124°0′W	Arctic Ocean	
76°10′N 124°0′W	Beaufort Sea	
75°8′N 124°0′W	M'Clure Strait	
74°24′N 124°0′W	Canada	Northwest Territories — Banks Island
73°51′N 124°0′W	Beaufort Sea	Burnett Bay
73°40′N 124°0′W	Canada	Northwest Territories — Banks Island
71°40′N 124°0′W	Amundsen Gulf	
69°23′N 124°0′W	Canada	Northwest Territories — passing through the Great Bear Lake; Yukon — for about 7 kilometres (4.3 mi) from 60°6′N 124°0′W, the easternmost part of the territory British Columbia — from 60°0′N 124°0′W
49°33′N 124°0′W	Strait of Georgia	
49°14′N 124°0′W	Canada	British Columbia — Vancouver Island; passing through Nanaimo
48°24′N 124°0′W	Strait of Juan de Fuca	
48°10′N 124°0′W	United States	Washington; Oregon — from 46°16′N 124°0′W
46°12′N 124°0′W	Pacific Ocean	Passing just west of the coast of Oregon, United States
45°5′N 124°0′W	United States	Oregon; California — from 42°0′N 124°0′W
39°59′N 124°0′W	Pacific Ocean	
60°0′S 124°0′W	Southern Ocean	
73°34′S 124°0′W	Antarctica	Unclaimed territory

== See also ==
- 123rd meridian west
- 125th meridian west
