= 56th meridian east =

Line of longitude

56th meridian east

The meridian 56° east of Greenwich is a line of longitude that extends from the North Pole across the Arctic Ocean, Europe, Asia, the Indian Ocean, the Southern Ocean, and Antarctica to the South Pole.

The westernmost part of the border between Kazakhstan and Uzbekistan is defined by the meridian.

The 56th meridian east forms a great circle with the 124th meridian west.

== From Pole to Pole ==
Starting at the North Pole and heading south to the South Pole, the 56th meridian east passes through:

| Co-ordinates | Country, territory or sea | Notes |
|---|---|---|
| 90°0′N 56°0′E | Arctic Ocean | |
| 81°18′N 56°0′E | Russia | Islands of Jackson, Salisbury, Champ, Alger and MacKlintok, Franz Josef Land |
| 80°4′N 56°0′E | Barents Sea | |
| 75°11′N 56°0′E | Russia | Severny Island and Yuzhny Island, Novaya Zemlya |
| 72°46′N 56°0′E | Kara Sea | |
| 71°21′N 56°0′E | Russia | Yuzhny Island, Novaya Zemlya |
| 70°34′N 56°0′E | Barents Sea | Pechora Sea |
| 68°38′N 56°0′E | Russia | Passing through Ufa (at 54°44′N 56°0′E) |
| 50°42′N 56°0′E | Kazakhstan | |
| 45°0′N 56°0′E | Kazakhstan / Uzbekistan border | |
| 41°19′N 56°0′E | Turkmenistan | |
| 38°4′N 56°0′E | Iran | |
| 27°5′N 56°0′E | Persian Gulf | Clarence Strait |
| 26°57′N 56°0′E | Iran | Island of Qeshm |
| 26°45′N 56°0′E | Persian Gulf | Strait of Hormuz |
| 25°52′N 56°0′E | United Arab Emirates | Passing through Ras al-Khaimah |
| 24°58′N 56°0′E | Oman | Al Buraimi Governorate |
| 24°53′N 56°0′E | United Arab Emirates | Emirate of Ajman |
| 24°51′N 56°0′E | Oman | |
| 24°7′N 56°0′E | United Arab Emirates | Al Ain, Emirate of Abu Dhabi |
| 24°4′N 56°0′E | Oman | |
| 17°55′N 56°0′E | Indian Ocean | Khuriya Muriya Bay |
| 17°31′N 56°0′E | Oman | Island of Al-Hallaniyah |
| 17°29′N 56°0′E | Indian Ocean | Passing just east of the islands of La Digue and Frégate, Seychelles; Passing just west of the island of Coëtivy, Seychelles; Passing just east of the island of Réunion, France |
| 60°0′S 56°0′E | Southern Ocean | |
| 66°10′S 56°0′E | Antarctica | Australian Antarctic Territory, claimed by Australia |

== See also ==
- 55th meridian east
- 57th meridian east
