= 57th meridian west =

Line of longitude

57th meridian west

The meridian 57° west of Greenwich is a line of longitude that extends from the North Pole across the Arctic Ocean, North America, the Atlantic Ocean, South America, the Southern Ocean, and Antarctica to the South Pole.

The 57th meridian west forms a great circle with the 123rd meridian east.

== From Pole to Pole ==
Starting at the North Pole and heading south to the South Pole, the 57th meridian west passes through:

Co-ordinates	Country, territory or sea	Notes
90°0′N 57°0′W	Arctic Ocean	
83°33′N 57°0′W	Lincoln Sea	
82°11′N 57°0′W	Greenland	Nyeboe Land
90°0′N 57°0′W	Baffin Bay	
74°10′N 57°0′W	Greenland	
74°7′N 57°0′W	Baffin Bay	
70°0′N 57°0′W	Davis Strait	
60°0′N 57°0′W	Atlantic Ocean	Labrador Sea
53°43′N 57°0′W	Canada	Newfoundland and Labrador — Labrador
51°24′N 57°0′W	Strait of Belle Isle	
50°59′N 57°0′W	Canada	Newfoundland and Labrador — island of Newfoundland
47°35′N 57°0′W	Atlantic Ocean	
5°59′N 57°0′W	Suriname	
2°34′N 57°0′W	Guyana	Area claimed by Suriname
1°54′N 57°0′W	Brazil	Pará; Amazonas — from 1°55′S 57°0′W; Pará — from 3°49′S 57°0′W; Mato Grosso — from 9°18′S 57°0′W; Mato Grosso do Sul — from 17°40′S 57°0′W
22°13′S 57°0′W	Paraguay	
27°28′S 57°0′W	Argentina	
29°39′S 57°0′W	Brazil	
30°5′S 57°0′W	Uruguay	
34°34′S 57°0′W	Río de la Plata	
36°20′S 57°0′W	Argentina	
37°19′S 57°0′W	Atlantic Ocean	
60°0′S 57°0′W	Southern Ocean	
63°21′S 57°0′W	Antarctica	Antarctic Peninsula — claimed by Argentina, Chile and United Kingdom
63°38′S 57°0′W	Southern Ocean	Weddell Sea — passing just east of Vega Island (at 63°49′S 57°3′W) and James Ross Island (at 64°10′S 57°3′W), Antarctica
64°21′S 57°0′W	Antarctica	Snow Hill Island — claimed by Argentina, Chile and United Kingdom
64°27′S 57°0′W	Southern Ocean	Weddell Sea
75°58′S 57°0′W	Antarctica	Territory claimed by Argentina, Chile and United Kingdom

== See also ==
- 56th meridian west
- 58th meridian west
