= 59th Street station =

59th Street station may refer to:

== New York City ==
- 59th Street (BMT Fourth Avenue Line) in Brooklyn, New York; serving the N, R, and W trains
- 59th Street (IRT Third Avenue Line) a demolished elevated station in Manhattan
- 59th Street (IRT Ninth Avenue Line) a demolished elevated station in Manhattan
- 59th Street station (New York Central Railroad), a disused railway station in the Park Avenue Tunnel, New York City
- 59th Street–Columbus Circle (New York City Subway), a subway station complex in Manhattan, New York consisting of:
  - 59th Street–Columbus Circle (IND Eighth Avenue Line); serving the A, B, C, and D trains
  - 59th Street–Columbus Circle (IRT Broadway–Seventh Avenue Line); serving the 1 and 2 trains
- Fifth Avenue–59th Street (BMT Broadway Line) in Manhattan, New York; serving the N, R, and W trains
- Lexington Avenue/59th Street (New York City Subway), a subway station complex in Manhattan, New York consisting of:
  - Lexington Avenue/59th Street (BMT Broadway Line); serving the N, R, and W trains
  - 59th Street (IRT Lexington Avenue Line); serving the 4, 5, 6, and <6> trains

== Elsewhere ==
- 59th Street station (Sacramento), a light rail station in Sacramento, California
- 59th/60th Street University of Chicago station, a commuter rail station in Chicago, Illinois

== See also ==
- 59th Street (Manhattan)
