= 121st meridian west =

Line of longitude

121st meridian west

The meridian 121° west of Greenwich is a line of longitude that extends from the North Pole across the Arctic Ocean, North America, the Pacific Ocean, the Southern Ocean, and Antarctica to the South Pole.

The 121st meridian west forms a great circle with the 59th meridian east.

== From Pole to Pole ==
Starting at the North Pole and heading south to the South Pole, the 121st meridian west passes through:

Co-ordinates	Country, territory or sea	Notes
90°0′N 121°0′W	Arctic Ocean	
76°45′N 121°0′W	Canada	Northwest Territories — Prince Patrick Island
75°44′N 121°0′W	M'Clure Strait	
74°28′N 121°0′W	Canada	Northwest Territories — Banks Island
71°26′N 121°0′W	Amundsen Gulf	
69°40′N 121°0′W	Canada	Northwest Territories — passing through the Great Bear Lake; British Columbia — from 60°0′N 121°0′W, passing through Tumbler Ridge
49°0′N 121°0′W	United States	Washington — passing 3 km (1.9 mi) west of Cle Elum; Oregon — from 45°39′N 121°0′W; California — from 42°0′N 121°0′W, passing through Modesto (at 37°38′N 121°0′W)
35°28′N 121°0′W	Pacific Ocean	
60°0′S 121°0′W	Southern Ocean	
73°41′S 121°0′W	Antarctica	Unclaimed territory

== See also ==
- 120th meridian west
- 122nd meridian west
