= 122nd meridian west =

Line of longitude

122nd meridian west (interactive map)

The meridian 122° west of Greenwich is a line of longitude that extends from the North Pole across the Arctic Ocean, North America, the Pacific Ocean, the Southern Ocean, and Antarctica to the South Pole.

122°W is the Seventh Meridian of the Dominion Land Survey in Canada.

The 122nd meridian west forms a great circle with the 58th meridian east.

== From Pole to Pole ==
Starting at the North Pole and heading south to the South Pole, the 122nd meridian west passes through:

Co-ordinates	Country, territory or sea	Notes
90°0′N 122°0′W	Arctic Ocean	
76°26′N 122°0′W	Canada	Northwest Territories — Prince Patrick Island
76°2′N 122°0′W	M'Clure Strait	
74°31′N 122°0′W	Canada	Northwest Territories — Banks Island
71°19′N 122°0′W	Amundsen Gulf	
69°48′N 122°0′W	Canada	Northwest Territories — passing through the Great Bear Lake; British Columbia — from 60°0′N 122°0′W; passing through Chilliwack
49°0′N 122°0′W	United States	Washington; Oregon — from 45°37′N 122°0′W; California — from 42°0′N 122°0′W; passing through San Jose
36°58′N 122°0′W	Pacific Ocean	
60°0′S 122°0′W	Southern Ocean	
73°35′S 122°0′W	Antarctica	Unclaimed territory

== See also ==
- 121st meridian west
- 123rd meridian west
