= 124th meridian east =

Line of longitude

124th meridian east (interactive map)

The meridian 124° east of Greenwich is a line of longitude that extends from the North Pole across the Arctic Ocean, Asia, the Pacific Ocean, the Indian Ocean, Australia, the Southern Ocean, and Antarctica to the South Pole.

The 124th meridian east forms a great circle with the 56th meridian west.

== From Pole to Pole ==
Starting at the North Pole and heading south to the South Pole, the 124th meridian east passes through:

Co-ordinates	Country, territory or sea	Notes
90°0′N 124°0′E	Arctic Ocean	
77°55′N 124°0′E	Laptev Sea	
73°48′N 124°0′E	Russia	Sakha Republic — islands of the Lena Delta and the mainland Amur Oblast — from 56°19′N 124°0′E
53°25′N 124°0′E	China	Heilongjiang; Inner Mongolia — from 51°15′N 124°0′E; Heilongjiang — from 48°23′N 124°0′E; Jilin — from 45°54′N 124°0′E; Liaoning — from 43°17′N 124°0′E
39°48′N 124°0′E	Yellow Sea	
33°17′N 124°0′E	East China Sea	
24°20′N 124°0′E	Japan	Islands of Kohamajima and Kuroshima
24°13′N 124°0′E	Pacific Ocean	Philippine Sea — passing just east of the island of Luzon, Philippines (at 13°43′N 123°58′E) — passing just west of the island of Catanduanes, Philippines (at 13°39′N 124°1′E)
13°17′N 124°0′E	Philippines	Agutaya Island
13°13′N 124°0′E	Albay Gulf	
13°5′N 124°0′E	Philippines	Island of Luzon
12°33′N 124°0′E	Samar Sea	
12°2′N 124°0′E	Philippines	Island of Masbate
11°48′N 124°0′E	Visayan Sea	
11°16′N 124°0′E	Philippines	Islands of Cebu and Mactan
10°17′N 124°0′E	Cebu Strait	
9°58′N 124°0′E	Philippines	Island of Bohol
9°36′N 124°0′E	Bohol Sea	
8°11′N 124°0′E	Philippines	Island of Mindanao
7°38′N 124°0′E	Celebes Sea	Illana Bay
7°3′N 124°0′E	Philippines	Island of Mindanao
6°48′N 124°0′E	Celebes Sea	
0°53′N 124°0′E	Indonesia	Island of Sulawesi (Minahassa Peninsula)
0°22′N 124°0′E	Molucca Sea	
1°49′S 124°0′E	Indonesia	Island of Timpaus
1°51′S 124°0′E	Banda Sea	
5°45′S 124°0′E	Indonesia	Tukangbesi Islands
5°58′S 124°0′E	Banda Sea	
8°20′S 124°0′E	Indonesia	Island of Pantar
8°25′S 124°0′E	Savu Sea	
9°20′S 124°0′E	Indonesia	Island of Timor
10°16′S 124°0′E	Timor Sea	
11°45′S 124°0′E	Indian Ocean	
16°15′S 124°0′E	Australia	Western Australia
33°26′S 124°0′E	Indian Ocean	Australian authorities consider this to be part of the Southern Ocean
60°0′S 124°0′E	Southern Ocean	
66°9′S 124°0′E	Antarctica	Australian Antarctic Territory, claimed by Australia

== See also ==
- 123rd meridian east
- 125th meridian east
