= 58th meridian west =

Line of longitude

58th meridian west

The meridian 58° west of Greenwich is a line of longitude that extends from the North Pole across the Arctic Ocean, North America, the Atlantic Ocean, South America, the Southern Ocean, and Antarctica to the South Pole.

The 58th meridian west forms a great circle with the 122nd meridian east.

== From Pole to Pole ==
Starting at the North Pole and heading south to the South Pole, the 58th meridian west passes through:

Co-ordinates	Country, territory or sea	Notes
90°0′N 58°0′W	Arctic Ocean	
83°32′N 58°0′W	Lincoln Sea	
82°8′N 58°0′W	Greenland	Nyeboe Land
75°5′N 58°0′W	Baffin Bay	
70°0′N 58°0′W	Davis Strait	
60°0′N 58°0′W	Atlantic Ocean	Labrador Sea
54°54′N 58°0′W	Canada	Newfoundland and Labrador — Labrador; Quebec — from 52°0′N 58°0′W
51°18′N 58°0′W	Gulf of Saint Lawrence	
49°34′N 58°0′W	Canada	Newfoundland and Labrador — island of Newfoundland
47°40′N 58°0′W	Atlantic Ocean	
6°47′N 58°0′W	Guyana	Passing just east of Georgetown
4°15′N 58°0′W	Suriname	
3°56′N 58°0′W	Guyana	Passing through area claimed by Suriname
1°33′N 58°0′W	Brazil	Pará; Amazonas — from 1°30′S 58°0′W; Pará — from 6°8′S 58°0′W; Mato Grosso — from 7°24′S 58°0′W
17°31′S 58°0′W	Bolivia	
19°29′S 58°0′W	Brazil	Mato Grosso do Sul
19°53′S 58°0′W	Bolivia	For about 20 km
20°3′S 58°0′W	Brazil	Mato Grosso do Sul
20°37′S 58°0′W	Paraguay	
25°2′S 58°0′W	Argentina	
26°5′S 58°0′W	Paraguay	
27°16′S 58°0′W	Argentina	
31°24′S 58°0′W	Uruguay	For about 15 km
31°32′S 58°0′W	Argentina	For about 10 km
31°38′S 58°0′W	Uruguay	
34°16′S 58°0′W	Río de la Plata	
34°48′S 58°0′W	Argentina	Passing just west of La Plata, Argentina
38°21′S 58°0′W	Atlantic Ocean	
51°23′S 58°0′W	Falkland Islands	Island of East Falkland — claimed by Argentina
51°45′S 58°0′W	Atlantic Ocean	
60°0′S 58°0′W	Southern Ocean	
61°54′S 58°0′W	South Shetland Islands	King George Island — claimed by Argentina, Chile and United Kingdom
62°4′S 58°0′W	Southern Ocean	
63°23′S 58°0′W	Antarctica	Antarctic Peninsula — claimed by Argentina, Chile and United Kingdom
63°41′S 58°0′W	Southern Ocean	Weddell Sea
63°51′S 58°0′W	Antarctica	James Ross Island — claimed by Argentina, Chile and United Kingdom
64°24′S 58°0′W	Southern Ocean	Weddell Sea
75°42′S 58°0′W	Antarctica	Territory claimed by Argentina, Chile and United Kingdom

== See also ==
- 57th meridian west
- 59th meridian west
