= 59th Regiment of Foot (disambiguation) =

Three regiments of the British Army have been numbered the 59th Regiment of Foot:

- 48th (Northamptonshire) Regiment of Foot, 59th Regiment of Foot, British infantry regiment numbered as the 59th Foot in 1747 and renumbered as the 48th in 1751.
- 57th (West Middlesex) Regiment of Foot, 59th Regiment of Foot, British infantry regiment raised in 1755 and renumbered as the 57th in 1756
- 59th (2nd Nottinghamshire) Regiment of Foot, British infantry regiment raised as the 61st and renumbered as the 59th in 1756
