= Jiuduansha =

Intertidal wetlands of Shanghai

Coordinates: 31°10′N 121°55.5′E

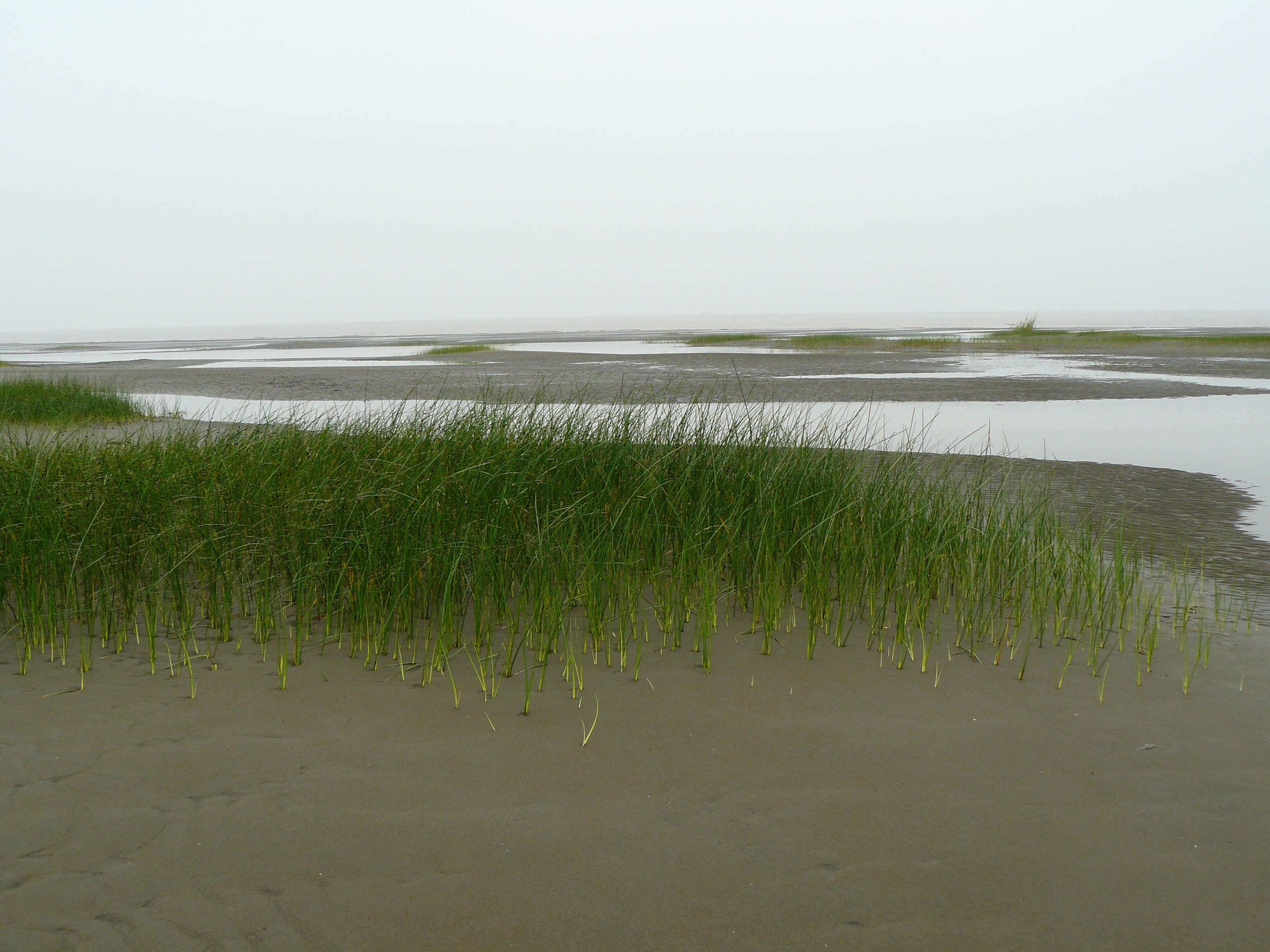
- Chinese: 九段沙
- Literal meaning: 9-part sands
Transcriptions
Standard Mandarin
- Hanyu Pinyin: Jiǔduànshā

Jiuduansha Wetland Nature Reserve
- Simplified Chinese: 九段沙湿地自然保护区
- Traditional Chinese: 九段沙濕地自然保護區
Transcriptions
Standard Mandarin
- Hanyu Pinyin: Jiǔduànshā Shīdì Zìránbǎohùqū

Islands

Shangsha
- Chinese: 上沙
- Literal meaning: Upper [Jiuduan]sha
Transcriptions
Standard Mandarin
- Hanyu Pinyin: Shàngshā

Zhongsha
- Chinese: 中沙
- Literal meaning: Middle [Jiuduan]sha
Transcriptions
Standard Mandarin
- Hanyu Pinyin: Zhōngshā

Xiasha
- Chinese: 下沙
- Literal meaning: Lower [Jiuduan]sha
Transcriptions
Standard Mandarin
- Hanyu Pinyin: Xiàshā

Jiangyanansha
- Simplified Chinese: 江亚南沙
- Traditional Chinese: 江亞南沙
- Literal meaning: Kiangya South [Jiuduan]sha
Transcriptions
Standard Mandarin
- Hanyu Pinyin: Jiāngyà Nánshā

Jiuduansha is a collection of four intertidal wetland shoals at the mouth of China's Yangtze River. They are administered as an island region of the municipality of Shanghai's Pudong New Area.

These shoals and the submerged land surrounding them to a depth of 6 meters (20 ft) form the Jiuduansha Wetland Nature Reserve. The entire area stretches roughly 46.3 kilometers (28.8 mi) east to west and 25.9 kilometers (16.1 mi) north to south, covering an area of 423.5 square kilometers (163.5 sq mi), although only 114.6 square kilometers (44.2 sq mi) of this is above sea level. The area is considered one of the national urban wetland parks of China and forms part of the China Biosphere Reserve Network. A 1996 field study found that, for seven bird species investigated, the number present at Jiuduansha exceeded 1% of the world's total for the species, establishing it as a Wetland of International Importance.

== Name ==
Although Jiuduansha literally translates as "Nine-Part Sands", the number nine is here being used in a colloquial way similar to English several. In fact, the group consists of four main shoals. These are sometimes given their Mandarin names of Shangsha, Zhongsha, Xiasha, and Jiangyanansha and sometimes translated as Upper, Middle, Lower, and South Jiuduansha. South Jiuduansha is known as Jiangya Nansha in Chinese after the pinyin romanization of the SS Kiangya, the passenger steamer which exploded nearby (probably owing to a mine from the Second World War or the Chinese Civil War) in 1948.

== History ==
Jiuduansha originally formed part of the Waitongsha shoal, but frequent floods of the Yangtze in 1949 and 1954 connected a series of troughs and separated Jiuduansha from the Tongsha shoal. Shanghai's universities have studied Jiuduansha since the 1990s and, in 1995, introduced cordgrass in order to speed the shoal's stabilization, particularly in light of roughly 71% reduction in sedimentation caused by the many dams erected along the course of the Yangtze during the 20th century. In March 2003, the Shanghai municipal government established the nature reserve. The cordgrass and environmental protection were intended to accommodate birds then living at the site being developed as Pudong International Airport. From October 2002 to January 2003, Fudan University and the reserve's administration conducted four joint surveys and, in 2005, the wetland was finally upgraded to a national nature reserve. In the time since its introduction, the cordgrass has been found to have become invasive, aggressively crowding out the native reeds and bulrushes and degrading parts of the wetlands. A wetland museum, as well as a Science Popularization Park on about 5 square kilometers (1.9 sq mi) of the island, are planned to increase public awareness and support.

== Ecology ==
Jiuduansha is the spawning ground for the hairy crab, one of the most important products of the Chinese fishing industry and a delicacy of the cuisine of Shanghai and eastern China. The shoals also host large communities of Cipango and Siberian prawn and swimming crabs. They are known to host 5 protected species of fish and 14 protected species of birds, including the black-faced spoonbill. All 14 observed species of aquatic mammals are protected and Jiuduansha is thought to be the most important habitat in China for the finless porpoise, the bottlenose dolphin, and the spotted seal. Many birds live on Jiuduansha, including wintering birds from Australia to Siberia, some of which are endangered species. Jiuduansha is an important transit station for these birds, since there are many fish for them to prey on, and the reeds are a good place for resting during the long journey. Most of the birds in Jiuduansha are first and second levels in protected animals in China. For example: Swan Goose; Oriental Stork; Spotted Greenshank; Platalea minor.
