= 58th meridian east =

Line of longitude

58th meridian east

The meridian 58° east of Greenwich is a line of longitude that extends from the North Pole across the Arctic Ocean, Europe, Asia, the Indian Ocean, the Southern Ocean, and Antarctica to the South Pole.

The 58th meridian east forms a great circle with the 122nd meridian west.

== From Pole to Pole ==
Starting at the North Pole and heading south to the South Pole, the 58th meridian east passes through:

Co-ordinates	Country, territory or sea	Notes
90°0′N 58°0′E	Arctic Ocean	
81°49′N 58°0′E	Russia	Islands of Rudolf, Karl-Alexander, Payer, Greely, Ziegler, Wiener Neustadt, Heiss and Hall, Franz Josef Land
80°5′N 58°0′E	Barents Sea	
75°39′N 58°0′E	Russia	Severny Island, Novaya Zemlya
73°59′N 58°0′E	Kara Sea	
70°30′N 58°0′E	Barents Sea	Pechora Sea
68°49′N 58°0′E	Russia	
51°5′N 58°0′E	Kazakhstan	
45°27′N 58°0′E	Uzbekistan	
42°29′N 58°0′E	Turkmenistan	
37°49′N 58°0′E	Iran	
25°38′N 58°0′E	Gulf of Oman	
23°42′N 58°0′E	Oman	
20°26′N 58°0′E	Indian Ocean	Passing just east of the island of Mauritius
60°0′S 58°0′E	Southern Ocean	
67°6′S 58°0′E	Antarctica	Australian Antarctic Territory, claimed by Australia

== See also ==
- 57th meridian east
- 59th meridian east
