= 56th meridian west =

Line of longitude

56th meridian west

The meridian 56° west of Greenwich is a line of longitude that extends from the North Pole across the Arctic Ocean, North America, the Atlantic Ocean, South America, the Southern Ocean, and Antarctica to the South Pole.

The 56th meridian west forms a great circle with the 124th meridian east.

== From Pole to Pole ==
Starting at the North Pole and heading south to the South Pole, the 56th meridian west passes through:

Co-ordinates	Country, territory or sea	Notes
90°0′N 56°0′W	Arctic Ocean	
83°34′N 56°0′W	Lincoln Sea	
82°15′N 56°0′W	Greenland	Nyeboe Land
72°40′N 56°0′W	Baffin Bay	
70°0′N 56°0′W	Davis Strait	
60°0′N 56°0′W	Atlantic Ocean	Labrador Sea
53°33′N 56°0′W	Canada	Newfoundland and Labrador — Labrador
51°53′N 56°0′W	Strait of Belle Isle	
51°35′N 56°0′W	Canada	Newfoundland and Labrador — Great Northern Peninsula on the island of Newfoundland
50°48′N 56°0′W	Atlantic Ocean	
50°0′N 56°0′W	Canada	Newfoundland and Labrador — island of Newfoundland
47°30′N 56°0′W	Fortune Bay	Passing just west of Brunette Island, Newfoundland and Labrador, Canada (at 47°16′N 55°59′W)
46°58′N 56°0′W	Canada	Newfoundland and Labrador — the tip of the Burin Peninsula on the island of Newfoundland
46°57′N 56°0′W	Atlantic Ocean	Passing just east of the island of Saint-Pierre, Saint Pierre and Miquelon (at 46°46′N 56°10′W)
5°49′N 56°0′W	Suriname	
2°24′N 56°0′W	Brazil	Pará
2°8′N 56°0′W	Suriname	
1°50′N 56°0′W	Brazil	Pará; Mato Grosso — from 9°29′S 56°0′W; Mato Grosso do Sul — from 17°14′S 56°0′W
22°17′S 56°0′W	Paraguay	
27°20′S 56°0′W	Argentina	
28°30′S 56°0′W	Brazil	Rio Grande do Sul
30°50′S 56°0′W	Uruguay	Passing just east of Montevideo (at 34°53′S 56°9′W)
34°52′S 56°0′W	Atlantic Ocean	
60°0′S 56°0′W	Southern Ocean	
63°8′S 56°0′W	Antarctica	Joinville Island and Dundee Island — claimed by Argentina, Chile and United Kingdom
63°34′S 56°0′W	Southern Ocean	Weddell Sea
76°16′S 56°0′W	Antarctica	Territory claimed by Argentina, Chile and United Kingdom

== See also ==
- 55th meridian west
- 57th meridian west
