= 59 Medium Regiment (India) =

- Active: 1965 – present
- Country: India
- Allegiance: India
- Branch: Indian Army
- Type: Artillery
- Size: Regiment
- Motto(s): Har Har Mahadev (Hail Lord Shiva)
- Colors: Red & Navy Blue
- Anniversaries: 1 May – Raising Day

Insignia
- Abbreviation: 59 Med Regt

59 Medium Regiment is part of the Regiment of Artillery of the Indian Army.

== Formation ==
The Regiment was raised on 1 May 1965 at Aurangabad as 59 Mountain Composite Regiment (Pack). The first commanding officer was Lieutenant Colonel BL Khanna. The Regiment had a headquarters battery, three mountain (pack) batteries and a heavy mortar battery. The troops belonged to Rajput, Dogra, Ahir and South Indian Classes. The unit was converted to a Field Regiment and is currently a Medium Regiment. The Regiment presently consists of 591, 592 and 593 Medium batteries.

== Equipment ==
The regiment has been equipped with the following guns –

- 4.2 inch heavy mortars
- 3.7 inch mountain howitzers
- 25-pounders
- 75/24 howitzers
- 105 / 37 mm light field guns
- 105 / 37 mm Indian field guns
- 130 mm M-46 guns
- 122 mm howitzers
- 160 mm heavy mortars

== Operations ==
The regiment has taken part in the following operations –

- Indo-Pakistani war of 1965 – The freshly minted regiment saw action in the Rajasthan sector during the war.
- Counter-terrorism operations in Nagaland

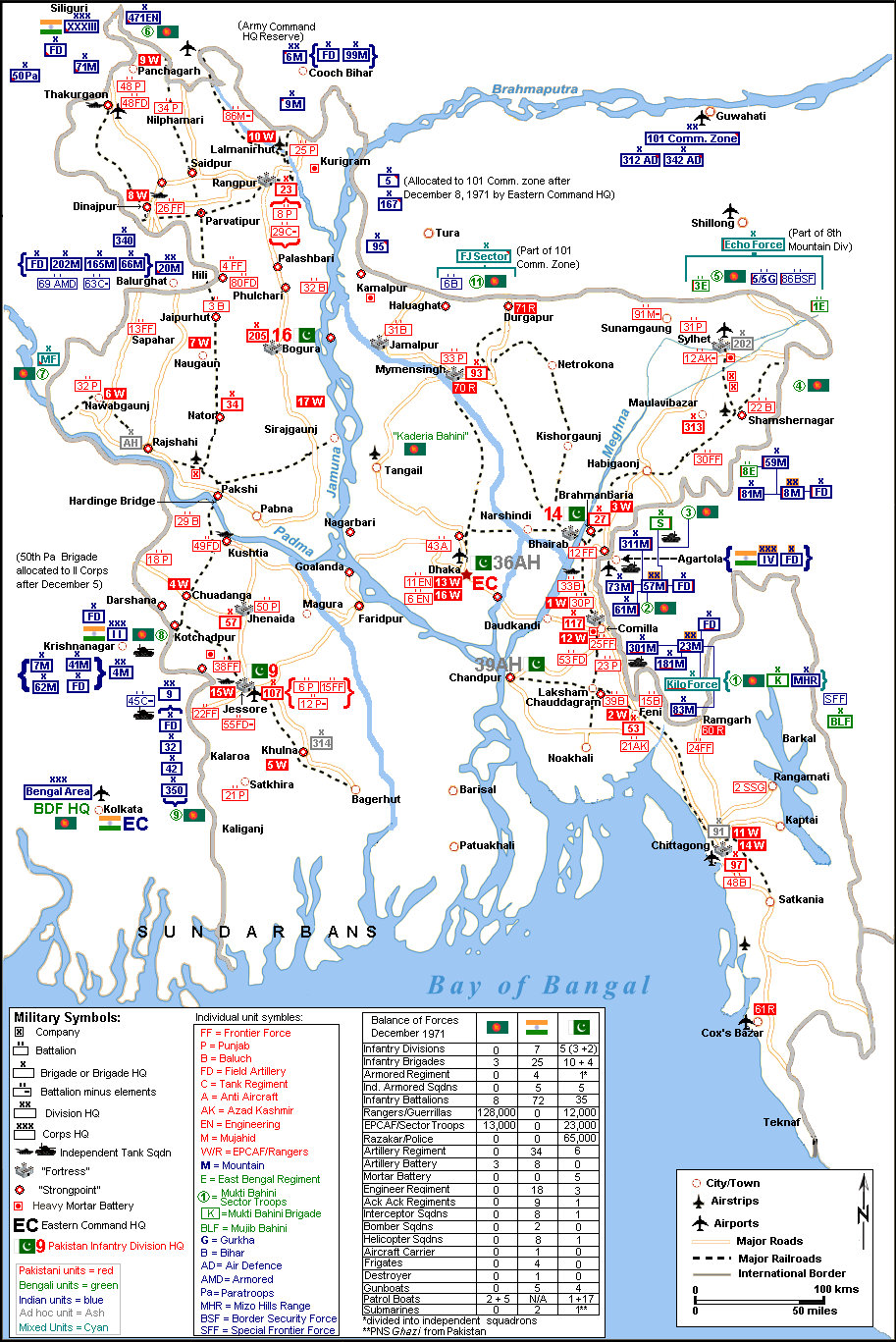
Deployment of troops in the eastern sector during the 1971 war

- Indo-Pakistani war of 1971 – During the war, the regiment was deployed in the Eastern sector close to Tripura. The regiment was part of 57 Mountain Artillery Brigade under 57 Mountain Division and equipped with 75/24 Pack Howitzers. During the Bangladesh Campaign, the unit moved their guns with a great deal of innovation over the difficult terrain, which included wide rivers to keep up with the rapidly advancing infantry towards Dhaka. This included dismantling the guns and getting air lifted by helicopter across the Meghna River. On 12 December 1971, Mil Mi-4 helicopters of the Indian Air Force flew 27 sorties from Brahmanbaria to Khatra near Narsingdi. The regiment along with 82 Light Regiment provided 4 Guards with the punch required to capture Narsinghdi by 1000 hours on 12 December. On 14 December, the axis of advance of 73 Mountain Brigade was changed towards Tongi to develop a threat to Dacca from the north. To support these operations, the guns had to move back to Narsinghdi. The unit used railway flats and bogies pushed manually by the troops and later by an engine, to move the artillery and to transport the heavy loads of 73 Mountain Brigade. This was nicknamed the ‘59 Combat Special train’. 593 Mountain Battery with 200 rounds of ammunition was first to travel in this manner. These wagons were manually pushed over 24 km on the night of 14 December to provide support to the Indian troops held up at Pubail due to heavy enemy resistance. In this operation, the regiment impounded an abandoned diesel locomotive and brought it to good use. The quick movement of artillery and equipment helped 59 Mountain Regiment and 150 Light Battery (of 82 Light Regiment) provide artillery fire to support 19 Rajputana Rifles capture Pubail. During the war, 59 Mountain Regiment was instrumental in the raising of the Mukti Bahini’s 594 Mujib Artillery Battery, which was equipped with 3.7-inch howitzers. This battery later became a nucleus for the raising of the first Bangladesh Artillery battalion and the Bangladesh Regiment of Artillery.
- Operation Meghdoot
- Operation Rakshak – counter terrorist operations in Jammu and Kashmir.
- Operation Parakram

== Gallantry awards ==
Sena Medal

- Captain Jagdish Chandra Sharma, Captain Kuttan Mahadevan
- Major Hari Dutt (Posthumous)
- Second Lieutenant Vinay Kumar Singh (Posthumous)
- Havildar Hardhan Chandra Roy (Posthumous)
- Gunner Subodh Ghosh (Posthumous)
- Brigadier (later Major General) Surender Pavamani
- Major (later Colonel) Vipul Harsh
- Major (later Colonel) Aditya Verma
- Major (later Colonel) Ashish Kumar Dube

Ati Vishisht Seva Medal

- Major General Surender Pavamani

== Achievements in sports ==
- Havildar S Damen Singh (2nd in Men's 50 km Race Walk)
