= 59th meridian west =

Line of longitude

59th meridian west

The meridian 59° west of Greenwich is a line of longitude that extends from the North Pole across the Arctic Ocean, North America, the Atlantic Ocean, South America, the Southern Ocean, and Antarctica to the South Pole.

The 59th meridian west forms a great circle with the 121st meridian east.

== From Pole to Pole ==
Starting at the North Pole and heading south to the South Pole, the 59th meridian west passes through:

Co-ordinates	Country, territory or sea	Notes
90°0′N 59°0′W	Arctic Ocean	
83°30′N 59°0′W	Lincoln Sea	
82°4′N 59°0′W	Greenland	Nyeboe Land
81°56′N 59°0′W	Newman Bugt	
81°52′N 59°0′W	Greenland	Hall Land
75°42′N 59°0′W	Baffin Bay	
70°0′N 59°0′W	Davis Strait	
60°0′N 59°0′W	Atlantic Ocean	Labrador Sea
55°9′N 59°0′W	Canada	Newfoundland and Labrador — Labrador; Quebec — from 52°0′N 59°0′W
50°46′N 59°0′W	Gulf of Saint Lawrence	
48°40′N 59°0′W	Canada	Newfoundland and Labrador — Port au Port Peninsula on the island of Newfoundland
48°31′N 59°0′W	Bay St. George	
48°8′N 59°0′W	Canada	Newfoundland and Labrador — island of Newfoundland
47°35′N 59°0′W	Atlantic Ocean	
7°53′N 59°0′W	Guyana	Territory claimed by Venezuela
1°19′N 59°0′W	Brazil	Roraima; Amazonas — from 0°14′N 59°0′W; Mato Grosso — from 8°46′S 59°0′W
16°18′S 59°0′W	Bolivia	
19°24′S 59°0′W	Paraguay	
24°39′S 59°0′W	Argentina	
38°40′S 59°0′W	Atlantic Ocean	
51°23′S 59°0′W	Falkland Islands	Island of East Falkland — claimed by Argentina
52°3′S 59°0′W	Atlantic Ocean	
60°0′S 59°0′W	Southern Ocean	
62°12′S 59°0′W	South Shetland Islands	King George Island and Nelson Island — claimed by Argentina, Chile and United Kingdom
62°20′S 59°0′W	Southern Ocean	
63°40′S 59°0′W	Antarctica	Antarctic Peninsula — claimed by Argentina, Chile and United Kingdom
64°57′S 59°0′W	Southern Ocean	Weddell Sea
75°29′S 59°0′W	Antarctica	Territory claimed by Argentina, Chile and United Kingdom

== See also ==
- 58th meridian west
- 60th meridian west
