= 59th Regiment =

59th Regiment or 59th Infantry Regiment may refer to:

- 59th Regiment of Foot (disambiguation), three British Army units carried this name
- 59th (Warwickshire) Searchlight Regiment, Royal Artillery, a unit of the British Army
- 59th Scinde Rifles (Frontier Force), a unit of the British Indian Army
- 59 Medium Regiment (India), a unit of the Indian Army
- 59th Infantry Regiment (United States), a unit of the United States Army
- 59th Air Defense Artillery Regiment, a unit of the United States Army

American Civil War

Union (Northern) Army

- 59th Illinois Volunteer Infantry Regiment
- 59th Indiana Infantry Regiment
- 59th New York Volunteer Infantry Regiment
- 59th Ohio Infantry

Confederate (Southern) Army

- 59th Virginia Infantry
