= Fifty-Niner =

Gold seekers in the 1859 Pike's Peak Gold Rush

A "Fifty-Niner" is the term used for the gold seekers who streamed into the Pike's Peak Country of western Kansas Territory and southwestern Nebraska Territory in 1859. The discovery of placer gold deposits along the South Platte River at the foot of the Rocky Mountains in northwestern Kansas Territory by a party of miners led by William Greeneberry "Green" Russell in July 1858 precipitated the Pike's Peak Gold Rush.

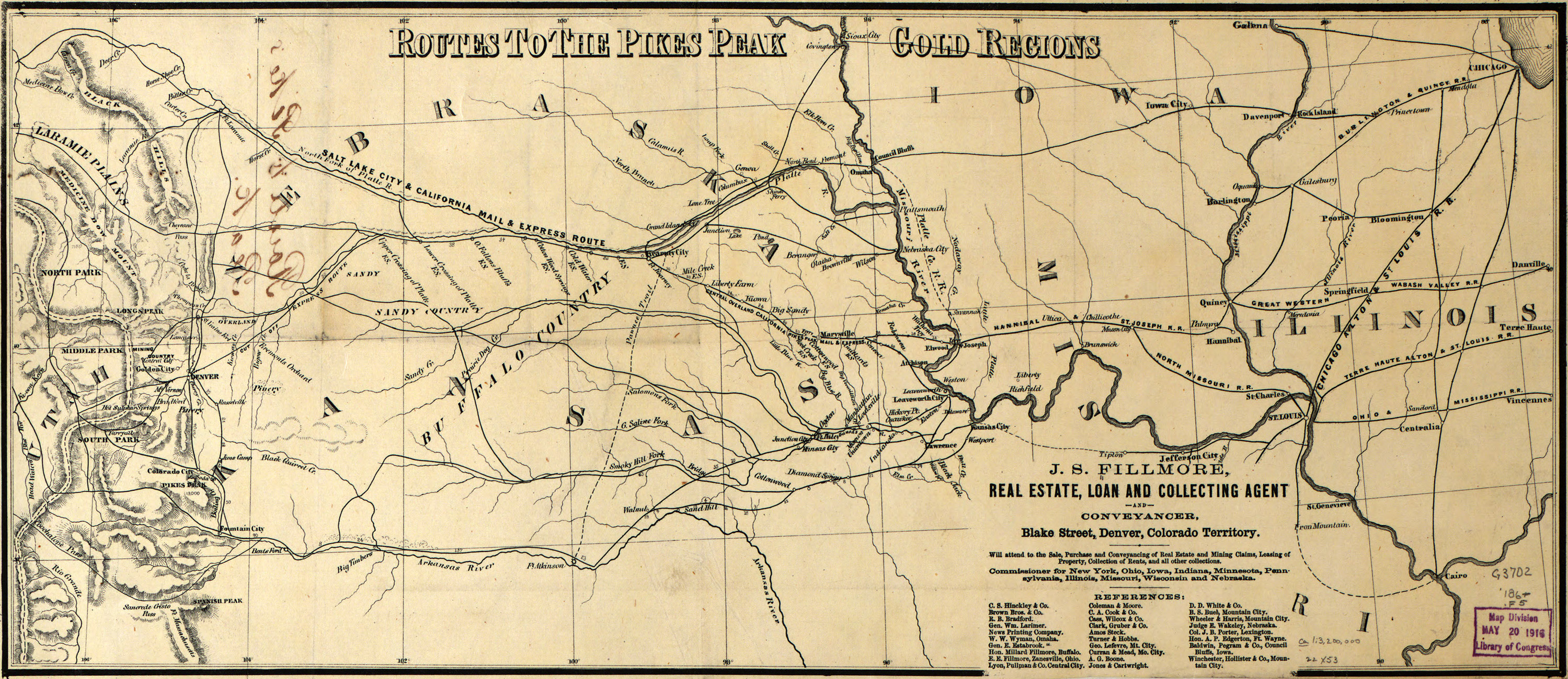
A map showing prominent routes to the gold regions, circa 1860.

Many Fifty-Niners took the "Smoky Hill Trail" west through Kansas Territory up the Kansas River valley. The last significant civilian settlement along this route was Manhattan, Kansas, several hundred miles east of the mountains. Between there and the mountains the Fifty-Niners had to cross the unmarked plains, often getting lost, and sometimes confronting Plains Indians. There is no record of how many prospective miners died en route to Pikes Peak.

The northern, or Platte River, route followed the Platte River through Nebraska along the Oregon Trail, then angled down along the South Platte River to the gold region.

The southern route followed the Santa Fe Trail along the Arkansas River to the vicinity of present-day Pueblo, Colorado, then north up Fountain Creek to the gold fields.

Among the most famous of the Fifty-Niners were Buffalo Bill Cody and millionaire miner Horace A. W. Tabor (although Tabor did not make his fortune until the subsequent "Colorado Silver Boom").

No gold was found near Pikes Peak until after the gold rush, but it was the first visible landmark for those traveling west across the High Plains. This gave rise to the slogan, "Pike's Peak or Bust."

== See also ==
- Pike's Peak Gold Rush
- Forty-niners
