= 59th meridian east =

Line of longitude

59th meridian east

The meridian 59° east of Greenwich is a line of longitude that extends from the North Pole across the Arctic Ocean, Europe, Asia, the Indian Ocean, the Southern Ocean, and Antarctica to the South Pole.

The 59th meridian east forms a great circle with the 121st meridian west.

== From Pole to Pole ==
Starting at the North Pole and heading south to the South Pole, the 59th meridian east passes through:

Co-ordinates	Country, territory or sea	Notes
90°0′N 59°0′E	Arctic Ocean	
81°51′N 59°0′E	Russia	Islands of Rudolf, Rainer, Wiener Neustadt, Hall and Salm, Franz Josef Land
79°58′N 59°0′E	Barents Sea	
75°55′N 59°0′E	Russia	Severny Island, Novaya Zemlya
74°20′N 59°0′E	Kara Sea	
70°27′N 59°0′E	Russia	Vaygach Island
69°54′N 59°0′E	Barents Sea	Pechora Sea
69°18′N 59°0′E	Russia	Dolgiy Island
69°17′N 59°0′E	Barents Sea	Pechora Sea
68°59′N 59°0′E	Russia	
50°42′N 59°0′E	Kazakhstan	
45°25′N 59°0′E	Uzbekistan	
42°31′N 59°0′E	Turkmenistan	
37°37′N 59°0′E	Iran	
25°25′N 59°0′E	Gulf of Oman	
23°8′N 59°0′E	Oman	
21°13′N 59°0′E	Indian Ocean	Passing just east of Masirah Island, Oman
60°0′S 59°0′E	Southern Ocean	
67°13′S 59°0′E	Antarctica	Australian Antarctic Territory, claimed by Australia
67°20′S 59°0′E	Southern Ocean	
67°23′S 59°0′E	Antarctica	Australian Antarctic Territory, claimed by Australia

== See also ==
- 58th meridian east
- 60th meridian east
