= Circles of latitude between the 80th parallel north and the 85th parallel north =

Circles of latitude

Following are circles of latitude between the 80th parallel north and the 85th parallel north:

== 81st parallel north ==
81st parallel north (interactive map)

The 81st parallel north is a circle of latitude that is 81 degrees north of the Earth's equatorial plane, in the Arctic. It crosses the Atlantic Ocean, the Arctic Ocean, Europe, Asia and North America.

At this latitude the sun is always visible during the summer solstice and astronomical twilight during the winter solstice.

=== Around the world ===
Starting at the Prime Meridian and heading eastwards, the parallel 81° north passes through:

Coordinates	Country, territory or sea	Notes
81°0′N 0°0′E	Atlantic Ocean	Greenland Sea
81°0′N 38°0′E	Arctic Ocean	Queen Victoria Sea
81°0′N 54°27′E	Russia	Franz Josef Land - Zichy Land
81°0′N 58°45′E	Arctic Ocean	
81°0′N 60°13′E	Russia	Franz Josef Land - La Ronciere Island
81°0′N 61°31′E	Arctic Ocean	
81°0′N 64°10′E	Russia	Franz Josef Land - Graham Bell Island
81°0′N 65°20′E	Kara Sea	Passing just north of Ushakov Island, Russia; Passing just south of Schmidt Island, Severnaya Zemlya, Russia
81°0′N 93°45′E	Russia	Severnaya Zemlya - Komsomolets Island
81°0′N 96°36′E	Arctic Ocean	
81°0′N 95°16′W	Canada	Nunavut - Axel Heiberg Island
81°0′N 91°38′W	Nansen Sound	
81°0′N 88°14′W	Canada	Nunavut - Ellesmere Island
81°0′N 66°52′W	Nares Strait	
81°0′N 61°25′W	Greenland	Petermann Glacier
81°0′N 19°5′W	Greenland	Romer Lake
81°0′N 14°18′W	Atlantic Ocean	Greenland Sea

== 82nd parallel north ==
82nd parallel north (interactive map)

The 82nd parallel north is a circle of latitude that is 82 degrees north of the Earth's equatorial plane, in the Arctic. It passes through the Arctic Ocean and North America. This is the first line of latitude in the Northern Hemisphere to only touch one continent.

At this latitude the sun is visible for 24 hours during the summer solstice and astronomical twilight during the winter solstice.

The world's northernmost continuously-inhabited settlement, the weather station and military facility of Alert in Nunavut, is closest to this parallel.

=== Around the world ===
Starting at the Prime Meridian and heading eastwards, the parallel 82° north passes through:

Coordinates	Country, territory or sea	Notes
82°0′N 58°56′E	Arctic Ocean	Passing just north of Rudolf Island, Franz Josef Land, Russia
82°0′N 89°0′W	Canada	Nunavut - Ellesmere Island
82°0′N 62°34′W	Nares Strait	
82°0′N 59°59′W	Greenland	Nyeboe Land
82°0′N 54°13′W	St George Fjord	
82°0′N 52°43′W	Greenland	Hendrik Island
82°0′N 51°34′W	Sherard Osborn Fjord	
82°0′N 49°0′W	Greenland	Wulff Land
82°0′N 46°31′W	Victoria Fjord	
82°0′N 32°26′W	Greenland	Christian Erichsen Ice Cap
82°0′N 29°57′W	Independence Fjord	
82°0′N 24°48′W	Greenland	Cape Peter Henrik
82°0′N 23°55′W	Hagen Fjord	
82°0′N 23°10′W	Greenland	Cape Rigsdagen
82°0′N 22°13′W	Arctic Ocean	Wandel Sea
82°0′N 21°18′W	Greenland	Princess Thyra Island
82°0′N 20°43′W	Arctic Ocean	Wandel Sea
82°0′N 20°17′W	Greenland	Princess Margaret Island
82°0′N 17°50′W	Arctic Ocean	

== 83rd parallel north ==
83rd parallel north (interactive map)

The 83rd parallel north is a circle of latitude that is 83 degrees north of the Earth's equatorial plane, in the Arctic. It passes through the Arctic Ocean and North America.

The northernmost land on earth, whether the permanent Kaffeklubben Island, or the shifting/resubmerging gravel banks of Oodaaq, ATOW1996, or 83-42, all of which are part of Greenland, are roughly 40 minutes of arc (75 to 79 kilometres) north of this parallel.

At this latitude the sun is visible for 24 hours during the summer solstice and astronomical twilight during the winter solstice.

=== Around the world ===
Starting at the Prime Meridian and heading eastwards, the parallel 83° north passes through:

Coordinates	Country, territory or sea	Notes
83°0′N 0°0′E	Arctic Ocean	
83°0′N 77°25′W	Canada	Nunavut - Ellesmere Island
83°0′N 68°18′W	Lincoln Sea	
83°0′N 46°39′W	Greenland	Sverdrup Island
83°0′N 46°13′W	Mascart Sound	
83°0′N 43°45′W	Greenland	Nansen Land
83°0′N 41°33′W	Thomas Thomsen Fjord	
83°0′N 41°19′W	Greenland	Borup Island
83°0′N 40°38′W	Adolf Jensen Fjord	
83°0′N 39°45′W	Greenland	MacMillan Island
83°0′N 39°43′W	De Long Fjord	
83°0′N 36°47′W	Greenland	Amundsen Land
83°0′N 33°20′W	Frederick E. Hyde Fjord / Citronen Fjord	
83°0′N 28°40′W	Greenland	Hans Egede Land
83°0′N 24°45′W	Arctic Ocean	

== 84th and 85th parallels north ==
84th parallel north (interactive map)
85th parallel north (interactive map)

The 84th parallel north and the 85th parallel north are circles of latitude that are, respectively, 84 and 85 degrees north of the Earth's equatorial plane, in the Arctic. No land lies on either the 84th or 85th parallel north; they only lie on the Arctic Ocean; the 84th parallel is the first parallel by degree to do so. Regions north of the 84th parallel are excluded from UTM Zones.

The northernmost land on earth, Kaffeklubben Island, Greenland, is roughly 40 kilometres south of the 84th parallel.

At the 84th and 85th parallels, the sun is visible for 24 hours, 0 minutes during the summer solstice. During the winter solstice, the 84th parallel is under astronomical twilight, and the 85th parallel is under total nighttime during the entire day. The 85th parallel is the first parallel by degree to do this. The Arctic Circle is the latitude where the center of the sun is visible at midnight during the summer solstice, as opposed to the entire disk.

== See also ==
- 80th parallel north
- Arctic Ocean (86th parallel north and above)
