= Cape Gray, Greenland =

Headland in North Greenland

Cape Gray Kap Gray
- Cape
- Coordinates: 82°13′N 51°49′W
- Location: North Greenland
- Offshore water bodies: Sherard Osborn Fjord; Lincoln Sea

Area
  - Total: Arctic

Cape Gray (Danish: Kap Gray) is a headland in North Greenland. Administratively it is part of the Northeast Greenland National Park.

== Geography ==
Cape Gray is located at the southern end of Castle Island, near the mouth of the Sherard Osborn Fjord opposite the eastern shore of Hendrik Island.

Pointing towards the inner fjord, it is one of the two capes of the island, together with the northernmost headland, Cape Cleveland.

Map of the Nares Strait area.

== See also ==
- Peary Land
