= Cape Cleveland, Lincoln Sea =

Headland in northern Greenland

Cape Cleveland Kap Cleveland
- Cape
- Coordinates: 82°18′N 52°15′W
- Location: North Greenland
- Offshore water bodies: Sherard Osborn Fjord; Lincoln Sea

Area
  - Total: Arctic

Cape Cleveland (Danish: Kap Cleveland) is a headland in North Greenland. Administratively it is part of the Northeast Greenland National Park.

== Geography ==
Cape Cleveland is located at the northern end of Castle Island, at the mouth of the Sherard Osborn Fjord opposite the eastern shore of Hendrik Island.

Pointing towards the Lincoln Sea, it is one of the two capes of the island, together with the southernmost headland, Cape Gray.

Map of the Nares Strait area.

== See also ==
- Peary Land
