= 83rd parallel =

83rd parallel may refer to:

- 83rd parallel north, a circle of latitude in the Northern Hemisphere
- 83rd parallel south, a circle of latitude in the Southern Hemisphere, in Antarctica
