= 84th parallel =

84th parallel may refer to:

- 84th parallel north, a circle of latitude in the Northern Hemisphere, in the Arctic Ocean
- 84th parallel south, a circle of latitude in the Southern Hemisphere, in Antarctica
