= 82nd parallel =

82nd parallel may refer to:

- 82nd parallel north, a circle of latitude in the Northern Hemisphere
- 82nd parallel south, a circle of latitude in the Southern Hemisphere, in Antarctica
