= 85th parallel =

85th parallel may refer to:

- 85th parallel north, a circle of latitude in the Northern Hemisphere, in the Arctic Ocean
- 85th parallel south, a circle of latitude in the Southern Hemisphere, in Antarctica
