= 81st parallel =

81st parallel may refer to:

- 81st parallel north, a circle of latitude in the Northern Hemisphere
- 81st parallel south, a circle of latitude in the Southern Hemisphere, in Antarctica
