= Baffin Bay =

Marginal sea between Greenland and Baffin Island, Canada

- ᓴᒃᓂᕈᑎᐊᒃ ᐃᒪᖓ / Avannaata Imaa
- Location within Greenland

- Location: Canada / Greenland
- Coordinates: 74°N 68°W
- Ocean/sea sources: Arctic Ocean
- Basin countries: Canada and Greenland
- Max. length: 1,450 km (900 mi)
- Max. width: 110–650 km (68–404 mi)
- Surface area: 689,000 km^{2} (266,000 sq mi)
- Average depth: 861 m (2,825 ft)
- Max. depth: 2,136 m (7,008 ft)
- Water volume: 593,000 km^{3} (142,000 cu mi)

Baffin Bay (Inuktitut: ᓴᒃᓂᕈᑎᐊᒃ ᐃᒪᖓ, romanized: Saknirutiak Imanga; Greenlandic: Avannaata Imaa; French: Baie de Baffin; Danish: Baffinsbugten), (Note: Former names include Baffin's Bay and Baffin's Sea.) located between Baffin Island and the west coast of Greenland, is defined by the International Hydrographic Organization as a marginal sea of the Arctic Ocean. It is sometimes considered a sea of the North Atlantic Ocean. It is connected to the Atlantic via the Davis Strait and the Labrador Sea. The narrower Nares Strait connects Baffin Bay with the Arctic Ocean. The bay is not navigable most of the year because of the ice cover and high density of floating ice and icebergs in the open areas. However, a polynya of about 80,000 km^{2} (31,000 sq mi), known as the North Water, opens in summer on the north near Smith Sound. Most of the aquatic life of the bay is concentrated near that region.

== Extent ==
The International Hydrographic Organization defines the limits of Baffin Bay as follows:

On the North. A line from Cape Sheridan, Grant Land (82°35′N 60°45′W) to Cape Bryant, Greenland.

On the East. The West Coast of Greenland.

On the South. The parallel of 70° North between Greenland and Baffin Land.

On the West. The Eastern limits of the North-West Passages [The East Coast of Ellesmere Island between C. Sheridan and Cape Norton Shaw (76°29′N 78°30′W), thence across to Phillips Point (Coburg Island) through this Island to Marina Peninsula (75°55′N 79°10′W) and across to Cape Fitz Roy (Devon Island) down the East Coast to Cape Sherard (Cape Osborn) (74°35′N 80°30′W) and across to Cape Liverpool, Bylot Island (73°44′N 77°50′W); down the East coast of this island to Cape Graham Moore, its southeastern point, and thence across to Cape Macculloch (72°29′N 75°08′W) and down the East coast of Baffin Island to East Bluff, its Southeastern extremity, and thence the Eastern limit of Hudson Strait].

— International Hydrographic Organization, Limits of Oceans and Seas, 3rd edition

== History ==
Dorset, Norse, and Thule cultures 900–1500

The area of the bay has been inhabited since c. 500 BC. Around AD 1200, the initial Dorset settlers were replaced by the Thule (the later Inuit) peoples. Recent excavations also suggest that the Norse colonization of the Americas reached the shores of Baffin Bay sometime between the 10th and 15th centuries. The English explorer John Davis was the first recorded European to enter the bay, arriving in 1585. In 1612, a group of English merchants formed the "Company of Merchants of London, Discoverers of the North-West Passage". Their governor Thomas Smythe organized five expeditions to explore the northern coasts of Canada in search of a maritime passage to the Far East. Henry Hudson and Thomas Button explored Hudson Bay, William Gibbons Labrador, and Robert Bylot Hudson Strait and the area which became known as Baffin's Bay after his pilot William Baffin. Aboard Discovery, Baffin charted the area and named Lancaster, Smith, and Jones Sounds after members of his company. By the completion of his 1616 voyage, Baffin held out no hope of an ice-free passage and the area remained unexplored for another two centuries. Over time, his account came to be doubted until it was confirmed by John Ross's 1818 voyage. More advanced scientific studies followed in 1928, in the 1930s and after World War II by Danish, American and Canadian expeditions.

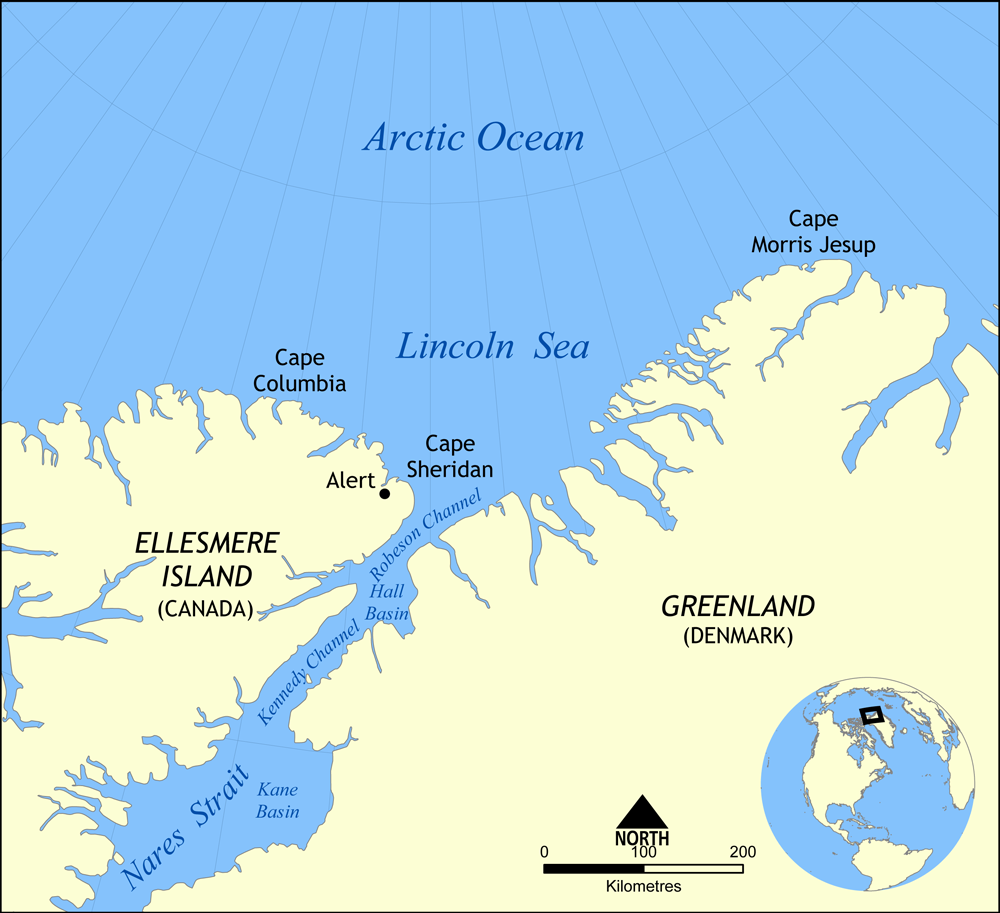
Robeson Channel, Hall Basin, Kennedy Channel, Kane Basin, and Nares Strait are all north of the northern limit of Baffin Bay between Cape Sheridan and Cape Bryant (unmarked).

Currently, there are a few Inuit settlements on the Canadian coast of the bay, including Arctic Bay (population 690), Pond Inlet (1,315) and Clyde River (820). Those settlements are accessed and supplied by air and annual sealifts. In 1975, a town was built at Nanisivik to support lead and zinc production at the Nanisivik Mine—the first Canadian mine in the Arctic. The mine was closed in 2002 due to declining resources and metal prices. Whereas the town still has a functional seaport and an airport, as of the 2006 census, it has an official population of zero.

Baffin Bay was the epicenter of a 7.3 magnitude earthquake in 1933. This is the largest known earthquake north of the Arctic Circle. It caused no damage because of its offshore location and the small number of the nearby onshore communities. The northwestern part of the bay remains one of the most seismically active regions in eastern Canada. Five earthquakes of magnitude 6 have occurred here since 1933. The latest strong earthquake occurred on 15 April 2010 and had the magnitude of 5.1.

== Geography and geology ==
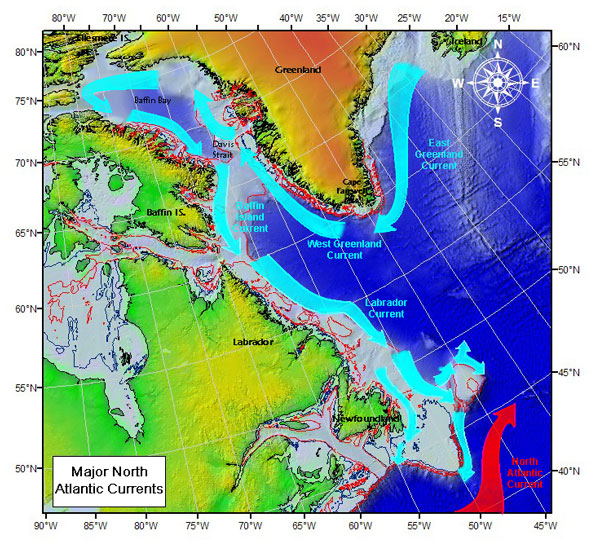
Major North Atlantic currents.

Baffin Bay is an arm of the Atlantic Ocean bounded by the Baffin Island in the west, Greenland in the east, and Ellesmere Island in the north. It connects to the Atlantic through the Davis Strait, and to the Arctic through several narrow channels of Nares Strait. It is a northwestern extension of the North Atlantic and Labrador Sea. It can also be viewed as a long strait separating Baffin Island and Greenland.

The bay is less than 1,000 m (3,300 ft) deep near the coast, where the sea bottom is covered with gravel, crushed stone and sand. In the centre, there is a deep pit called the Baffin Basin, reaching 2,136 m (7,008 ft) (see depth map), which is mostly covered in silt. Currents form a cyclonic circulation. On the eastern periphery, in summer, the West Greenland Current transports water from the Atlantic Ocean to the North. In its western part, the Baffin Island Current brings the Arctic waters to the south.

== Climate, hydrology and hydrochemistry ==
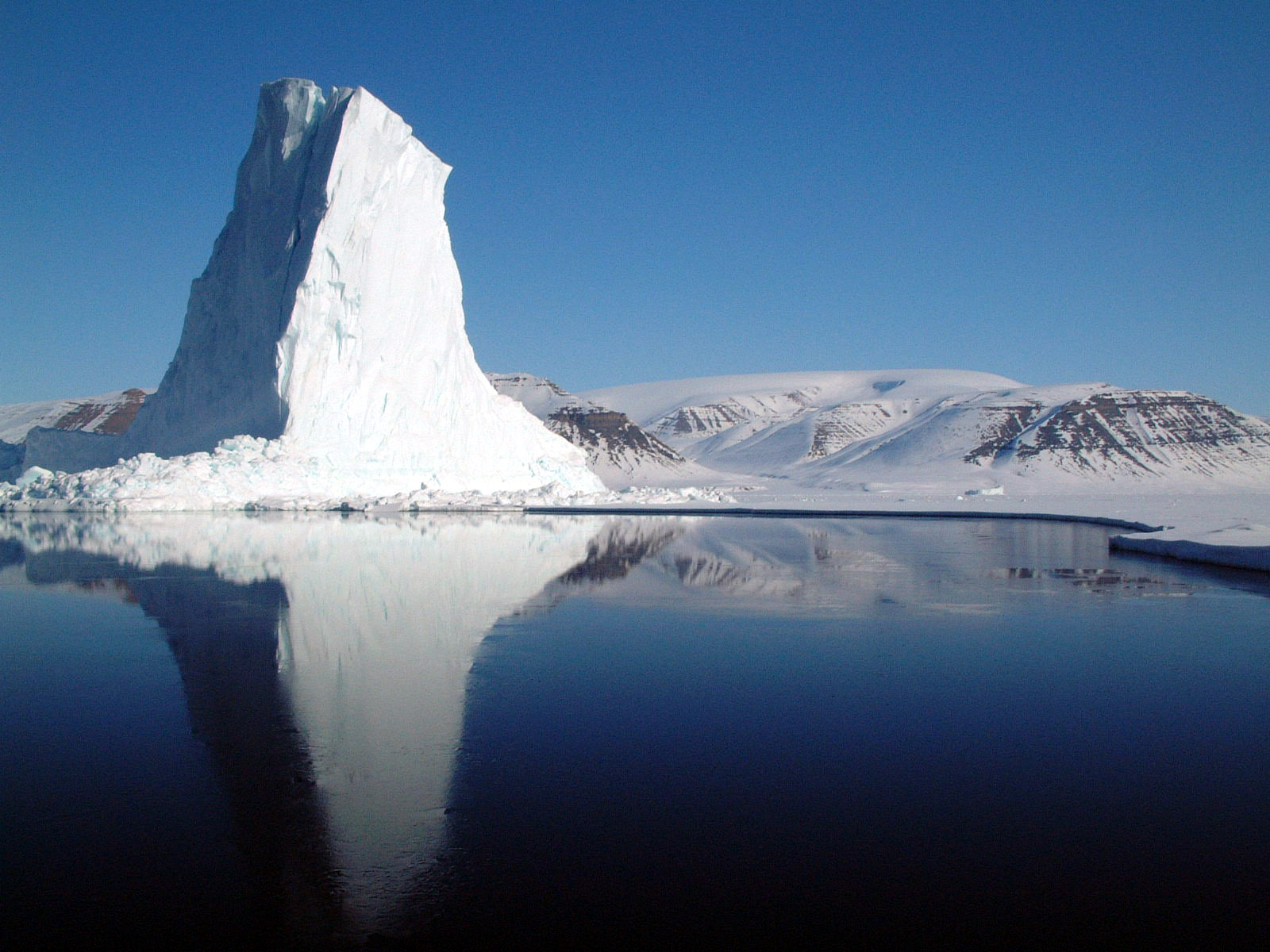
An iceberg at the edge of the Baffin Bay's sea ice.

The climate is Arctic with frequent storms, especially in winter. Average January temperatures are −20 °C (−4 °F) in the south and −28 °C (−18 °F) in the north. In July, the average temperature is 7 °C (45 °F). The annual precipitation is 100–250 mm (3.9–9.8 in) on the Greenland side and about twice as much near Baffin Island.

The water temperature at the surface is below −1 °C (30 °F) in winter. In summer, it varies from 4–5 °C (39–41 °F) in the south-east to 0 °C (32 °F) and below at north-west. The salinity exceeds 34‰ (parts per thousand) in winter. In summer, it is 32‰ on the east and 30–31‰ on the west. Deep waters are formed as a result of mixing of Arctic and Atlantic waters; their temperature is about −0.5 °C (31.1 °F) and salinity is 34.5 ‰. In winter, 80% of the bay is covered with continuous ice, floating ice and fast ice. In some winters, the continuous ice stretches from shore to shore. The ice is most abundant in March and least in August–September. In summer, drifting ice remains in the central and western parts of the bay. Numerous icebergs are formed in this period and are brought, together with ice, to the Atlantic Ocean near Newfoundland.

The tides are semidiurnal, with an average height of 4 m (13 ft) and the maximum of 9 m (30 ft). Their speed varies between 1 and 3.7 km/h (0.62 and 2.30 mph) hour and the direction by as much as 180°. This variability results in the collision and crushing of fresh, old, and pack ice. Winds are predominantly north-western through the whole year. South-eastern and eastern winds are common in July and August.

== North Water ==
Between May and July (sometimes April), a significant portion of navigable open water (polynya) forms at the extreme north of the bay, presumably due to the relatively warm Greenland Current. With an area of about 80,000 km^{2} (31,000 sq mi) in summer, it is the largest polynya of the Canadian Arctic and covers the Smith Sound between the Ellesmere Island and Greenland. This polynya has a stable position and existed for at least 9,000 years. It was first described in 1616 by William Baffin and was named North Water by whalers of the 18–19th centuries.

== Wildlife ==
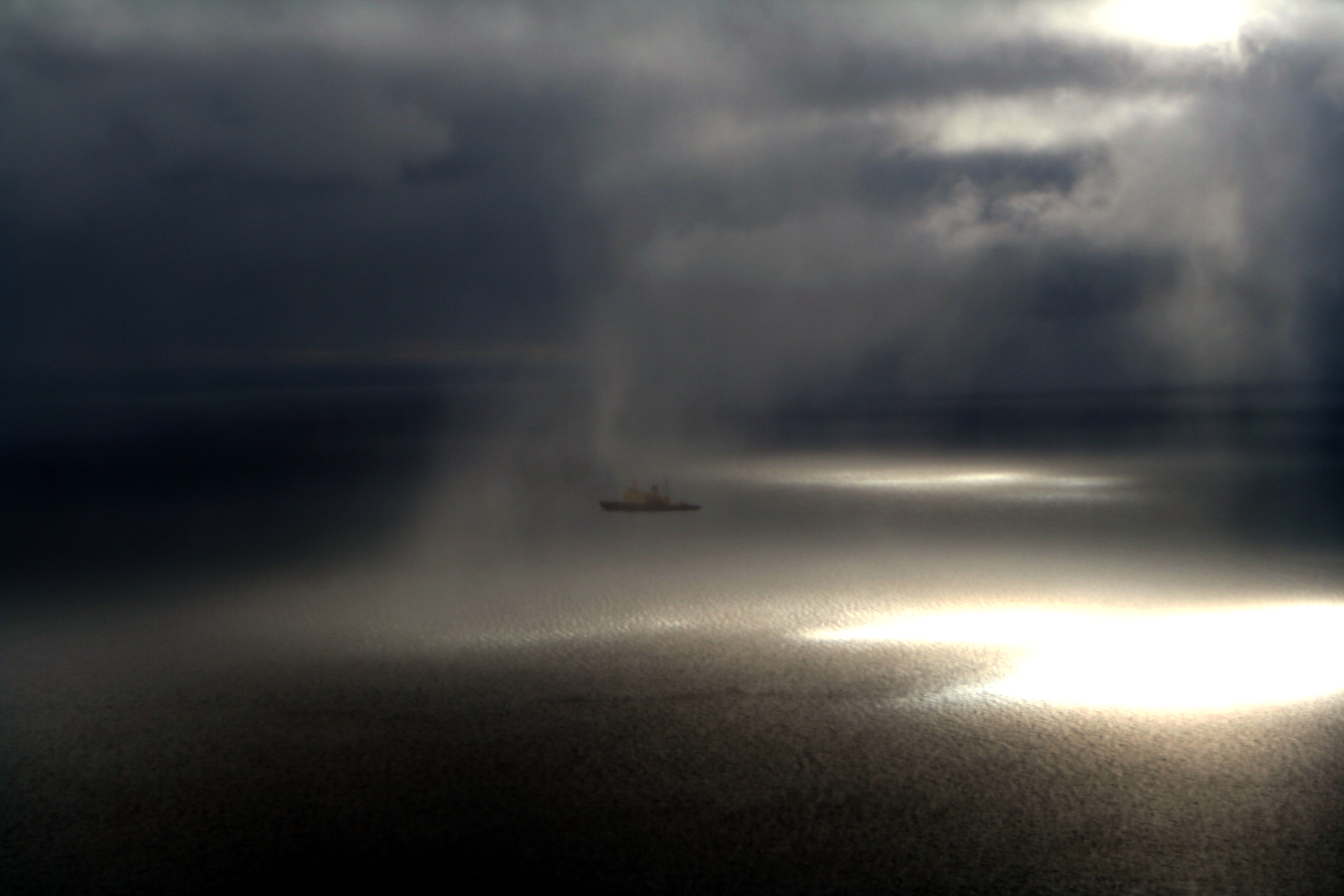
Fog over Baffin Bay

The North Water provides air to ice algae and zooplankton and is characterized by abundant fauna. Of about 20,000 beluga whales living in the Baffin Bay, some 15,000 are concentrated at the North Water. Other abundant animals of the region include walrus, narwhal, harp seal, bearded seal, ringed seal, bowhead whale, rorquals and polar bear. All aquatic mammals crucially depend on the availability of open water; they have very limited ability to maintain breathing holes in ice and are all vulnerable to attacks by the polar bear when breathing at the holes. The seals and walrus occupy areas of fast ice, which is essential for giving birth and raising the pups. Bearded seals feed near the bottom of the bay and therefore are restricted to the shallow waters. Ringed seal is the most common meal of the polar bear. It is also an occasional prey of the walrus and Arctic fox. Most large animals of the bay are being traditionally hunted, but the hunting has been restricted in the 20th century in order to preserve the wildlife population. For example, the quota for polar bears in the bay area is 105 per year.

There are about 400 plant and tree species on the bay shores, including birch, willow, alder and plants adapted to salty soils, as well as lyme grass, mosses, and lichens. These serve as food for caribou and rodents, such as lemming. Resident fish species include polar cod, Arctic flounder (Pleuronectidae, Liopsetta), four-horned sculpin and capelin, whereas cod, haddock, herring, halibut, and rattail migrate from the Atlantic. The birds are represented by the little auk, snowy owl, willow ptarmigan, rock ptarmigan, gyrfalcon, Arctic redpoll and guillemots. Most of them migrate to the south during the winter.

== Oil and gas ==
The US Geological Survey has estimated that at least 13% of the world's undiscovered oil deposits and 30% of the world's undiscovered gas pockets are located in the Arctic, with the seas around Greenland potentially holding large amounts of natural gas and lesser amounts of crude oil and natural-gas liquids. Accordingly, the Greenland authorities have offered a large number of off-shore concessions for potential hydrocarbon (oil and gas) extraction. The largest concession-areas are located in seas west of Greenland; primarily in Baffin Bay and the Davis Strait, but with several smaller concessions in the Greenland Sea in the east also.

== See also ==
- 1968 Thule Air Base B-52 crash
