= Top of the World Expedition =

July 1996 arctic expedition of the Roosvelt and Benedict

The Top of the World Expedition, or alternately the American Top of the World Expedition or ATOW, was a July 1996 arctic expedition of the Roosvelt and Benedict ranges of the north of Greenland, planned by avid Wisconsin-native hikers and climbers John Jancik and Ken Zerbst, and aided in by a team of 8 additional people. It carried the ultimate goal of reaching "Ultima Thule" on foot for the first time.

John Jancik and Ken Zerbst at the summit of John Denver Peak, 1996

== Background and Expedition Planning ==
The expedition lasted 30-days and its main goals were to reach Oodaaq Island (which was believed to be the northernmost piece of land at the time but was later discovered to be a temporary gravel bar.) on foot for the first time in history, to be the first explorers to reach and explore Moore Glacier, which is the largest glacier in the Roosvelt Range, and to summit Stjernebannertinde, a large mountain first sighted from the coast by Robert Peary but never climbed.

Students of geological sciences at UW-Milwaukee, Jancik and Zerbst took a class together relating to the arctic regions, which greatly intrigued them to learn more. Zerbst stated that, after visiting the on-campus library, which had an entire section dedicated to the arctic, he was surprised to learn how little-explored the northern region of Greenland was.

After finishing their studies, Jancik and Zerbst started to plan a 1980 expedition, named the Wisconsin-Greenland Expedition, which would consist of a large team, funds, and expedition gear, but the expedition failed to garner enough funding and was canceled. In the years preceding 1996, Jancik founded ECHO Geophysical Corp., and hired Zerbst as a geophysical analyst. The two continued working on planning an expedition together, whilst also developing the professional work that could potentially be of help in raising additional funds.

== The 1996 American Top of the World Expedition ==
In 1996, they finally received the necessary funding from an array of sponsors (including Osprey, North Face, and PowerBar), and organized the official expedition, which would include a total of ten people, including Jancik and Zerbst, Dr. Terri Baker (the wife of Jancik), and wilderness photographer Galen Rowell, among others including Peter Skafte, Dr Joe Sears, Steve Gardiner, Jim Schaeffer, and Dr. Bob Palais.

The team left from Iceland, traveling by bush plane to northern Greenland. They left for a 30-day planned trek through the tundra, to explore Moore Glacier, summit Stjernebannertinde (also known as "Star Spangled Banner Peak"), and reach Oodaaq Island, which was at the time understood to be the most northern point of land in the world. Over four weeks, the expedition accomplished all of their goals, however, due to a navigational error, they did not reach Oodaaq Island. They instead reached a previously undiscovered gravel bar that was actually farther north than Oodaaq, which was named ATOW1996.

== The 2001 Expedition and later years ==
After the 1996 chapter, the expedition reformed temporarily in July of 2001, for the "Return to the Top of the World". This expedition accomplished an array of goals, including summiting Helvetia Tinde (the highest-elevation mountain of the northernmost mountain range in the world), first-ascenting an unnamed peak in the Roosvelt Range, which they later named "John Denver Peak" after singer John Denver, and reaching Cape Morris Jessup by foot, the northernmost piece of contiguous Greenland.

Years after the expeditions in 2004, at an Explorer's Club event in New York City, Ken Zerbst talked about his experiences, on a panel that also included Sir Edmund Hillary, Buzz Aldrin, and Elon Musk.
