= Steensby Glacier =

Glacier in Greenland

- Steensby Gletscher
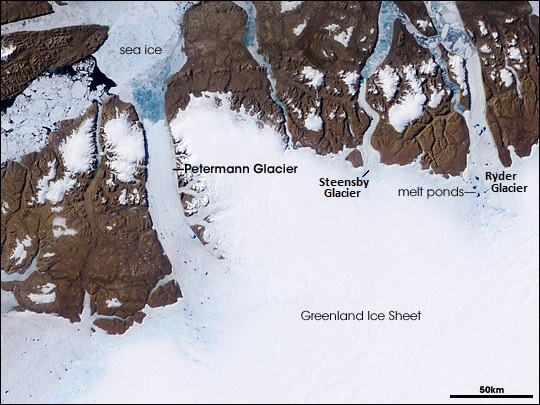
- The Steensby Glacier between Petermann Glacier and Ryder Glacier in a NASA picture

- Location within Greenland
- Type: Tidal outlet glacier
- Location: Greenland
- Coordinates: 81°27′N 53°0′W
- Area: 4,700 km^{2} (1,800 sq mi)
- Length: 60 km (37 mi)
- Width: 4.8 km (3.0 mi)
- Thickness: 75 m (246 ft) - 105 m (344 ft)
- Terminus: Saint George Fjord; Lincoln Sea

Steensby Glacier (Danish: Steensby Gletscher) is a major glacier in northern Greenland.

This glacier was first mapped in 1917 during Knud Rasmussen's 1916–1918 Second Thule Expedition to north Greenland and was named after Danish ethnologist Hans Peder Steensby.

== Geography ==
The Steensby Glacier originates in the Greenland Ice Sheet. It is roughly north–south oriented and has its terminus between Nyeboe Land and Warming Land at the head of the Saint George Fjord. The fjord is free from ice in the summer, and the glacier forms a floating tongue within the fjord that has shrunk since it was measured in 1963.

Map of part of Ellesmere Island and far Northern Greenland.

== Bibliography ==
- Anthony K. Higgins, North Greenland Glacier Velocities and Calf Ice Production

== See also ==
- List of glaciers in Greenland
