= Stray Dog West =

Island in Greenland

Coordinates: 83°40′37″N 31°12′00″W

Stray Dog West (Russian: Стрэй-Дог-Вест, romanized: Strei-Dog-Vest; Danish: Stray Dog West (Ø)) is an island in Greenland. It is a candidate for the northernmost island on Earth.

== Toponymy ==
The island is likely named for its relative geographic isolation. Due to its infrequent mention in the media, it is occasionally referred to as "Stray Dog West Island". The name is borrowed rather than directly translated into other languages.

== History ==
Stray Dog West was discovered during a 2007 expedition led by Dennis Schmitt. The island rises approximately four meters above sea level, suggesting that future sea-level rise could permanently submerge it. Its terrain consists of sediment, including gravel, mud and boulders. In 2007, the island's estimated dimensions were roughly 100 by 60 metres (330 ft × 200 ft).

== Territorial disputes ==
In 2007, Denmark dispatched an icebreaker to the surrounding area to collect data for a potential extension of its maritime territory. Russia opposed Denmark's proposal, claiming that the underwater ridge originates from Russian territory, which would include Stray Dog West and other disputed islands.

Additionally, there is debate over whether Stray Dog West qualifies as an island, as it becomes submerged at high tide.

== See also ==
- Kaffeklubben Island – Island off northern Greenland
- Northernmost point of land
- Qeqertaq Avannarleq – Iceberg north of Greenland
