= Uunartoq Qeqertaq =

Island off the coast of Greenland

Coordinates: 71°29′N 21°51′W

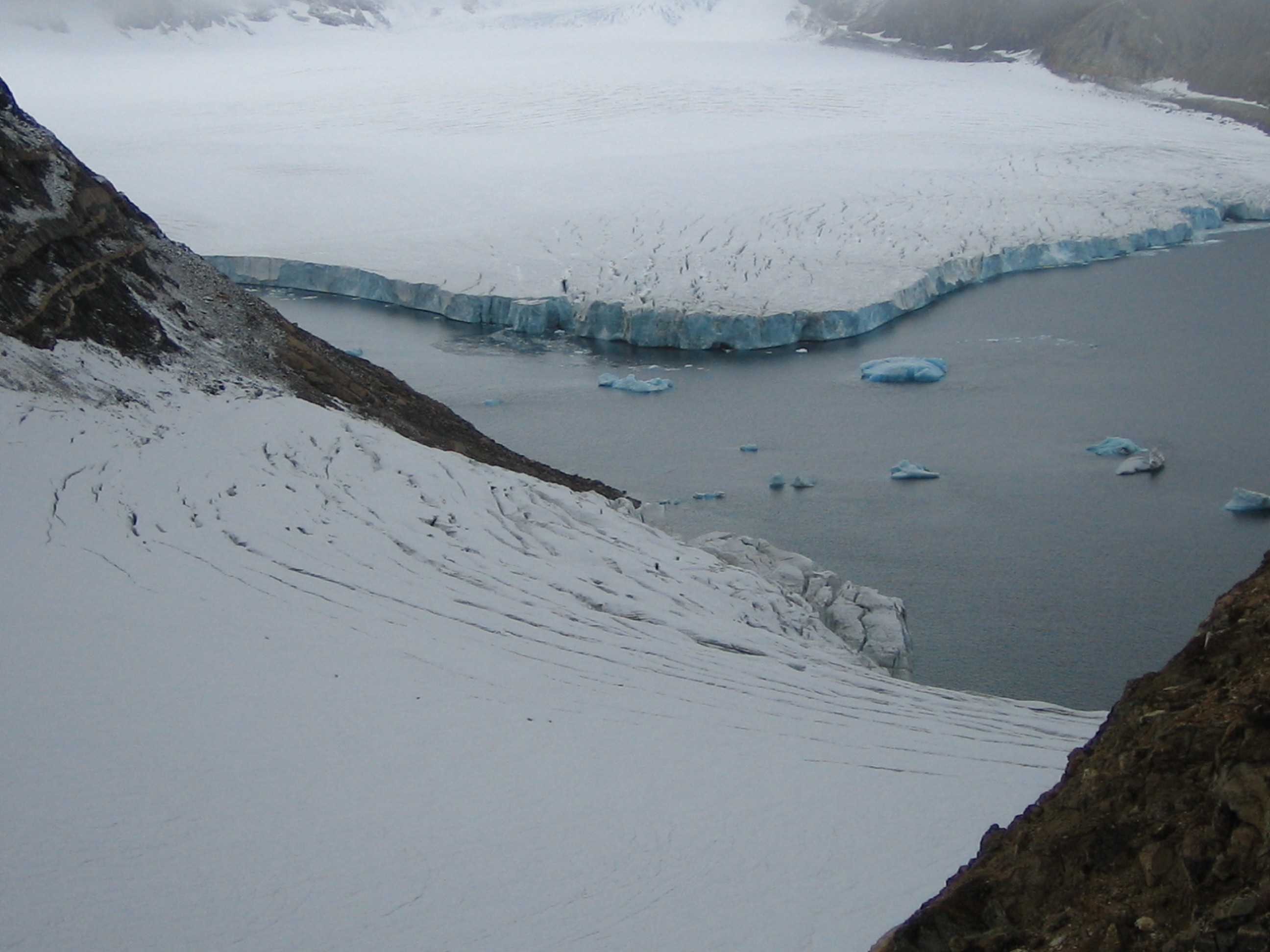
The new strait uncovered by a retreating ice shelf, taken from Uunartoq Qeqertaq in 2006

Greenlandic: Uunartoq Qeqertaq, English: Warming Island, is an island off the east central coast of Greenland, 550 kilometres (342 miles) north of the Arctic Circle. It became recognized as an island only in September 2005, by US explorer Dennis Schmitt. It was attached to the mainland of Liverpool Land by glacial ice even in 2002, when the ice shelves began retreating rapidly in this area, so that by 2005 it was no longer attached to the mainland. Members of the scientific community believe this newly discovered island is a direct result of global warming.

== Controversy ==
Patrick Michaels, a climatologist and prominent global warming denier, created a controversy over the history of Uunartoq Qeqertaq in a post on his website, World Climate Report, in which he argued that the island had been previously uncovered in the 1950s toward the end of a brief warm period in Greenland.

Despite a general lack of suitably detailed maps, Michaels found a map published by Ernst Hofer, a photographer who did aerial surveys of the area in the early 1950s, which showed the Uunartoq Qeqertaq landmass unconnected to Greenland. Michaels concluded therefore that Uunartoq Qeqertaq was also a separate island when observed by Hofer in the 1950s, and more broadly that Uunartoq Qeqertaq is an example of unjustified concern about the future outcomes of global warming.

Dennis Schmitt countered Michaels' theory in an article by New York Times reporter Andy Revkin, contending that Hofer's map is inaccurate. Citing discrepancies such as the absence on Hofer's map of nearby Reynolds Island, he suggested that the discrepant features are consistent with an aerial view of the area when covered with fog, which has often obscured low-lying areas like Reynold's Island and the ice-bridge connecting Uunartoq Qeqertaq to the Greenlandic mainland. He further observed, "I see by the markings of the 1957 document that it is to be construed as indeed only schematic, that it is explicitly incomplete."

Michaels explained that Hofer included the map in his book "so as to place his pictures and stories in context."

No photographic evidence is available that would resolve the issue.

The island was also part of a 2011 controversy when it was included in the Times Atlas of the World, along with a revised depiction of the Greenland ice sheet that showed a 15% reduction. After being alerted through the media, the U.S. National Snow and Ice Data Center reported that the atlas editors must have used a 2001 map showing only the thickest segment of the ice sheet.

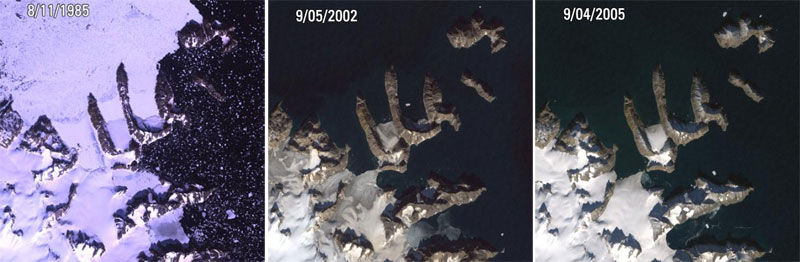
A comparison of satellite pictures between 1985 and 2005.

== See also ==
- Effects of global warming
- Physical impacts of climate change
