= Qeqertaq Avannarleq =

Iceberg north of Greenland

Qeqertaq Avannarleq (Greenlandic for 'the northernmost island') is a grounded iceberg in the Arctic Ocean, covered by a layer of soil, pebbles and mud. Its name is unofficial. Discovered in August 2021 off of the northern tip of Greenland, it was originally thought to be an island. In 2022, it was re-designated as an iceberg with a surface consisting primarily of seabed mud and moraine, an accumulation of unconsolidated debris left behind by glaciers. One theory as to its creation was that it was formed relatively recently, during a violent storm.

== Discovery and description ==
In 2021, scientists were out to visit Oodaaq, a similar formation discovered in the 1970s that also is among those in contention to be the northernmost point of land. But what they thought, due to a GPS error, was Oodaaq, turned out to be a different mass 780 metres (2,560 ft) north-west of Oodaaq. They believed it was a previously unknown island measuring approximately 60 m × 30 m (197 ft × 98 ft), with a maximum elevation of around 3 metres (9.8 ft). The scientists proposed the unknown island be called "Qeqertaq Avannarleq", Greenlandic for "the northernmost island".

When photographs of a landing on Qeqertaq Avannarleq were posted to social media, a group of hobbyist adventurers known as island hunters prompted further investigation. Morten Rasch of the University of Copenhagen department of geosciences and natural resource management contacted an expert at the Technical University of Denmark (DTU). "Together with DTU, we realized that my GPS had erred, leading us to believe that we were on Oodaaq. In fact, we had just discovered a new island further north, a discovery that ever so slightly expands the Kingdom", explained Rasch. The location was confirmed later by the GPS on the helicopter that was used by the group to reach the island. It was believed likely that Qeqertaq Avannarleq was a "short-lived islet". "No one knows how long it will remain. In principle, it could vanish as soon as a powerful new storm hits", Rasch stated. In 2021, Rene Forsberg, head of geodynamics at the National Space Institute in Denmark, said Qeqertaq Avannarleq "meets the criteria of an island", though he noted that "these small islands come and go".

However, in September 2022, Danish researcher René Forsberg, head of geodynamics at the National Space Institute in Denmark, announced that further research had shown Qeqertaq Avannarleq "unequivocally" is not an island, but the top of a grounded iceberg, covered by a layer of soil, pebbles and mud, likely deposited by glaciers in the area.

This gravel bank has been among the candidates to be recognized as the northernmost point of land. An undisputed candidate, Kaffeklubben Island, is classified as permanent, being discovered in 1900 A.D., and being 700 metres (2,300 ft) farther north than Cape Morris Jesup, the northernmost point of mainland Greenland. All candidates north of Kaffeklubben Island are the matter of dispute.

== See also ==
- Kaffeklubben Island
- Northernmost point of land
- List of islands of Greenland
