= Castle Island (Greenland) =

Island in far northern Greenland

Native name: Castle Ø
- Location of Castle Island in Greenland
- Interactive map of Castle Island

Geography
- Location: Lincoln Sea
- Coordinates: 82°11′N 52°53′W
- Area: 47.6 km^{2} (18.4 sq mi)
- Length: 11 km (6.8 mi)
- Width: 4.5 km (2.8 mi)
- Highest elevation: 660 m (2170 ft)

Administration
- Greenland

Demographics
- Population: 0

Castle Island (Danish: Castle Ø) is an island in far northern Greenland. Administratively it is part of the Northeast Greenland National Park.

== Geography ==
Castle Island is located in Saint Andrew Bay, east of Hendrik Island, in the mouth area of Sherard Osborn Fjord. It is separated from Hendrik Island by a 5 kilometres (3 miles) wide sound. The northernmost headland of the island is Cape Cleveland and the southernmost Cape Gray.

The island is unglaciated with two lakes between two mountain ridges. The peak in its eastern end reaches 660 metres (2,165 feet). The sea around the island is rarely free from ice.

Map of the Lincoln Sea area.

== See also ==
- List of islands of Greenland
