= Northernmost point of land =

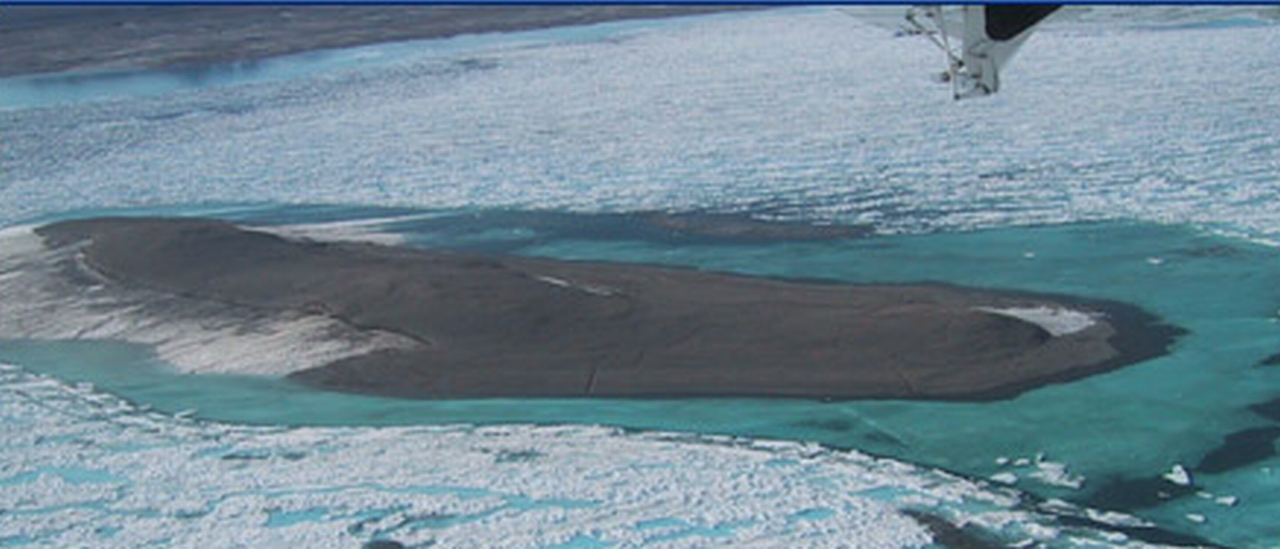
Kaffeklubben Island in 2008

The northernmost point of land on Earth is a contentious issue due to variation of definition. The impermanence (or uncertain permanence) of some of the contenders makes determination difficult. Confounders include ice sheets, water movements and inundation, storm activity that may build, shift, or destroy banks of moraine material, and observational difficulties due to remoteness. However, a bathymetric survey in 2022 confirmed that certain previous contenders, such as 83-42, Qeqertaq Avannarleq, and ATOW1996, are not permanent islands/landmasses as they are not connected to the seabed: they are gravel banks floating on an ice sheet.

The following table sets out the main contenders (or previous contenders) for this title.

Island name	Coordinates	Distance from the North Pole	Discovered by	Discovery year	Permanent?	Notes
83-42	83°42′05.2″N, 30°38′49.4″W	700.5 km	Dennis Schmitt	2003	No; not connected to seabed	35 m by 15 m and 4 m high; deconfirmed by the 2022 survey as a true land
Ultima Thule 2008	83°41′N, 31°6′W	702.4 km	2008 Ultima Thule expedition	2008	Unknown	Needs verification
RTOW2001	83°41′06″N, 30°45′36″W	702.5 km	RTOW expedition	2001	No; not connected to seabed	Deconfirmed by the 2022 bathymetric survey
ATOW1996	83°40′34.8″N, 30°38′38.6″W	703.2 km	ATOW expedition	1996	No; not connected to seabed	10 m long and 1 m high; deconfirmed by the 2022 survey as a true island
Stray Dog West	83°40′37″N, 31°12′W	703.3 km	Dennis Schmitt	2007	Yes; submerged during high tide	Considered as a land/ridge, but not an island
Qeqertaq Avannarleq	83°40′17″N, 30°42′43″W	703.4 km	Morten Rasch	2021	No; not connected to seabed	30 m by 60 m and 3–4 m high; deconfirmed by the 2022 survey as a true land
Oodaaq	83°40′N, 30°40′W	704.2 km	Uffe Petersen	1978	No; is a gravel bank	15 m by 8 m, appears to be submerged periodically
Kaffeklubben	83°39′45″N, 29°50′W	704.7 km	Robert Peary	1900	Yes	700 m by 300 m by 30 m high; official, undisputed northernmost permanent land on Earth
Cape Morris Jesup	83°37′39″N, 32°39′52″W	708.6 km	Robert Peary	1900	Yes	Northernmost tip of Greenland

Currently, Kaffeklubben Island is the northernmost undisputed land that permanently remains above water. However, due to the ever-shrinking Arctic ice, there could be more discoveries in the near future.

In addition, the Gakkel Ridge has been showing some volcanic activity in recent decades, so a new landmass could form even further north from a future eruption.

In 2022, a Swiss-Danish expedition visited the area to confirm the existence of previously discovered islands and islets north of "Inuit Qeqertaat" (Kaffeklubben Island) at latitude 83°39 054″ N, 30°37 045″ W. Measurements by Martin Nissen from the Danish and Greenlandic national mapping agency and René Forsberg with DTU Space, Technical University of Denmark confirmed that all offshore islets north of Inuit Qeqertaat (Kaffeklubben Island) have been debris-covered icebergs.

== See also ==
- Extremes on Earth
