= Saint George Fjord =

Fjord in northern Greenland

- Location in Greenland
- Location: Arctic
- Coordinates: 81.91667°N 53.25°W
- Ocean/sea sources: Lincoln Sea
- Basin countries: Greenland
- Max. length: 90 km (56 mi)
- Max. width: 9 km (5.6 mi)

Saint George Fjord is a fjord in northern Greenland. To the north, the fjord opens into the Lincoln Sea. Administratively it is part of the Northeast Greenland National Park.

== Geography ==
It is a fairly large fjord that opens to the NNW between Cape Bryant and Dragon Point, at the northern end of Hendrik Island becoming broader towards its head. Saint George Fjord forms Nyeboe Land's eastern coastline and Hendrik Island forms part of the northern half of the facing shore, while the shore south of the Hartz Sound that separates the island from the mainland is part of Warming Land. The Hartz Sound connects the mid fjord area with neighboring Sherard Osborn Fjord to the east.

The western shore is fringed by cliffs as far as Cape Fulford, 8 km (5.0 mi) km from the mouth. The Steensby Glacier at the fjord's head discharges ice from the Greenland Ice Cap.

Map of the Lincoln Sea area.

== See also ==
- List of fjords of Greenland
