= Dennis Schmitt =

American explorer (born 1946)

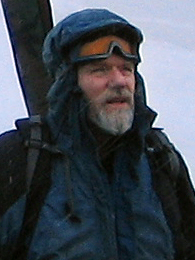
- Dennis Schmitt on Warming Island, 2006
- Born: Berkeley, California, US
- Education: University of California, Berkeley
- Occupations: Explorer, adventurer, composer

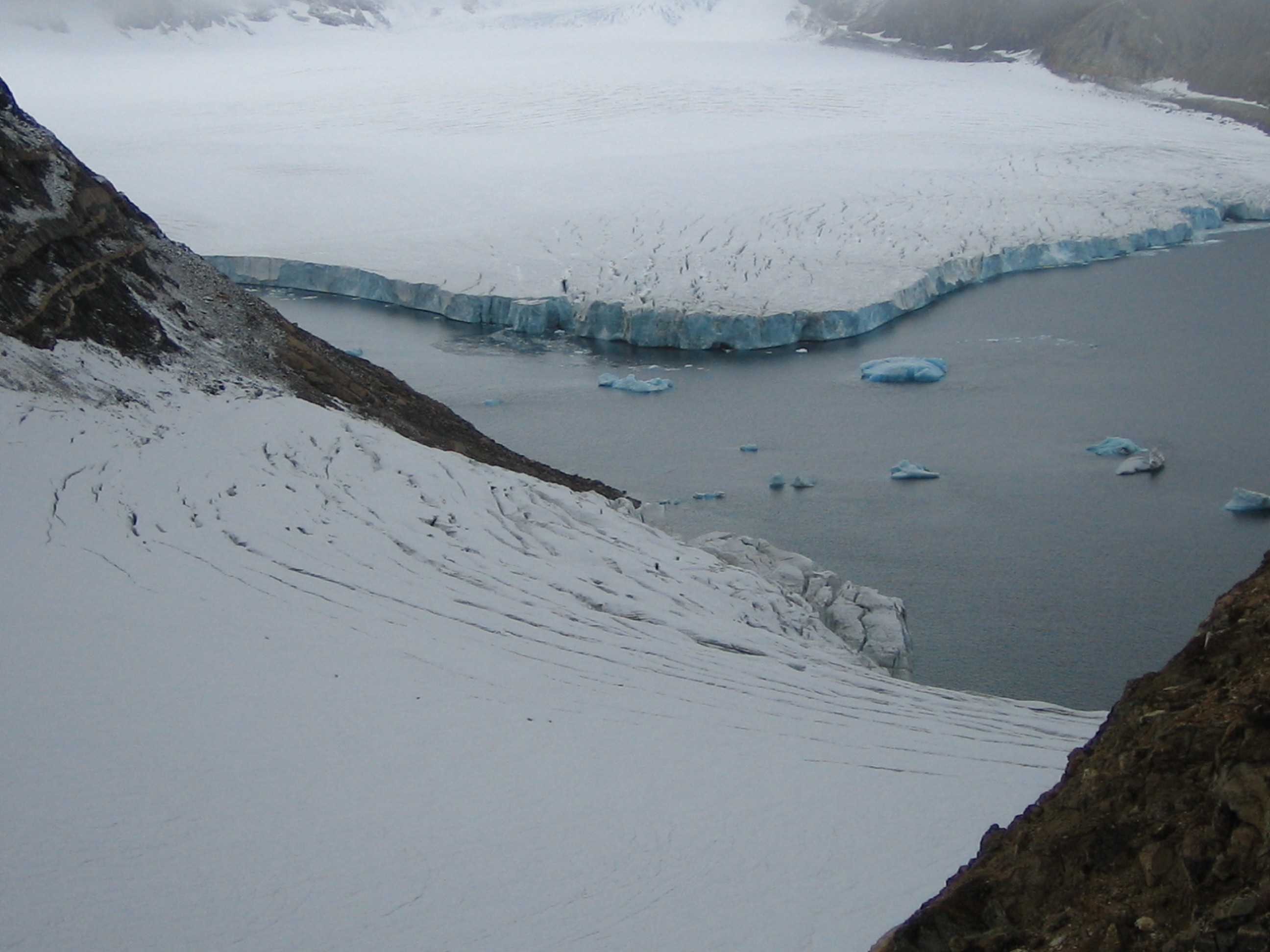
The new strait uncovered by a retreating ice shelf, taken from Warming Island

Dennis Schmitt is an American adventurer and linguist.

== Early life ==
Schmitt grew up in Berkeley, California, the son of mixed German and American parentage. His father was a plumber. Displaying early aptitude with languages, music and mathematics, Schmitt graduated from Berkeley High School in 1963, and went on to study linguistics at UC Berkeley with Noam Chomsky in his late teens. Chomsky recruited Schmitt, aged 19, to travel to Alaska's Brooks Range and attempt to learn the Nunamiut dialect.

== Career ==
=== Expeditions ===
Schmitt lived for four years at an Alaskan Inuit village named Anaktuvuk Pass before leading expeditions, some with the Sierra Club. In 2003, Schmitt discovered one of the candidates for the title of "northernmost land in the world". Deciding that Greenland should name its own landmarks, he simply called it "83-42" after its latitude, a name that has remained.

Two years later, in 2005, Schmitt discovered a new islet revealed by the retreat of an ice shelf in East Greenland. Uunartoq Qeqertaq, Greenlandic for "The Warming Island", lies 400 miles north of the Arctic Circle. The Sierra Club reported on a Schmitt quote to The New York Times:

We felt the exhilaration of discovery. We were exploring something new. But of course, there was also something scary about what we did there. We were looking in the face of these changes, and all of us were thinking of the dire consequences.

Schmitt was also credited with the July 2007 discovery of another candidate for the "northernmost" title, named Stray Dog West by expedition member Holly Wenger. Stray Dog West, at 83º40'30", belongs to a shifting, semi-permanent archipelago locked in the sea ice north of Peary Land in northeast Greenland, named the Stray Dog Islands. The first islet of the archipelago was discovered on July 10, 1996, by Steve Gardiner and Jim Schaefer and is commonly known as the 1996 ATOW Island after the 1996 American – Top Of The World Expedition.

A 2022 survey by the Leister Go North expedition later confirmed that 83-42, Uunartoq Qeqertaq, Stray Dog West, and all other islets north of Kaffeklubben Island are not permanent islands, but rather icebergs covered with moraine material. These islets are temporary, as they shift and will break apart with continued melting and ice break-up.

Schmitt was the first person to climb the highest point of the Daly Range, part of the northernmost mountain chain on Earth, as well as Alaska's Brooks Range from Point Hope to the Mackenzie River, and made the first traverse of Axel Heiberg Island, northern Canada. He also crossed the sea ice of the Bering Straits to the Soviet Union, and travelled through Inuit villages of eastern Siberia. Upon his return, the FBI detained Schmitt but released him without charge.

== Personal life ==
Schmitt speaks multiple languages, including Russian, Norwegian, Danish, and French. He lives in Berkeley and composes classical music, being credited for the soundtrack to the 1978 movie, The Alaska Wilderness Adventure. Schmitt also writes sonnets under the pen name D O'Farrell.

== See also ==
- List of polar explorers
- Polar exploration
- History of Greenland
