= Oodaaq =

Island northeast of Greenland

- Location within Greenland

Geography
- Location: Arctic Ocean
- Coordinates: 83°40′N 30°40′W
- Length: 15 m (49 ft)
- Width: 8 m (26 ft)

Administration
- Greenland
- Zone: Northeast Greenland National Park

Oodaaq or Oodap Qeqertaa was a bank of gravel and silt northeast of Greenland. During the first modern survey and mapping of northern Greenland in 1978, which had a side goal to position both Cape Morris Jesup and Kaffeklubben Island, the small c. 50 × 100 m Oodaaq Island was sighted by geodetic survey assistant Uffe Petersen to the north of Kaffeklubben Island during Doppler satellite measurements at the north tip of Kaffeklubben Island. The gravel bank, which later turned out to be a debris-covered iceberg, was measured in connection with the first modern geodetic survey of northernmost Greenland by the Danish Geodetic Institute and added to the national topographic map of Greenland as it was assumed to be an island. A few years later Oodaaq disappeared, and it turned out to have been an iceberg.

== Location ==
Oodaaq lay at 83° 40′ north and 30° 40′ west 705 km (438 mi).

== History ==
It was discovered in 1978 when a Danish survey team led by Uffe Petersen landed a helicopter on Kaffeklubben Island to confirm that it did indeed lie further north than the tip of Greenland. Having confirmed the fact, a member of the team noticed a dark spot 1,300 m (4,300 ft) northeast of Kaffeklubben Island. The survey team landed on the island in a helicopter and later named it Oodaaq after the Inuk who accompanied Robert Peary on his journey to the North Pole.

== Debate ==
Gravel banks such as this are generally considered not to qualify for the title of the world's northernmost point of land as they are rarely permanent. In fact, several subsequent expeditions have claimed that Oodaaq has now disappeared beneath the ocean.

In July 1998, during an aerial reconnaissance flight, Peter Skafte photographed a small island farther north than any previously observed. In July 2003, Peter Skafte, Mara Boland, and Dennis Schmitt, and three others walked across the melting sea ice to the new island. It is located about three kilometres (two miles) north of Kaffeklubben Island, at about 83°42'N. Snow and ice had melted to reveal a 35-metre (115 ft) bank of rocks and sand at a height of about 4 m (13 ft). Later Ken Zerbst failed to locate the island in 2008 while using a helicopter.

In July 2001, the Return to the Top of the World Expedition came to the conclusion that the previously-discovered island and permanent land feature ATOW1996 was the northernmost point of land on Earth.

Several possible explanations exist for the failure to locate the island in 2008.

- The island may not be a permanent land feature connected to the bottom of the sea.
- Seasonal and yearly accumulation of snow and ice has rendered the island invisible.
- The island was discovered in a belt of multiyear fast ice, but global warming has eroded this layer of ice along the Greenland coast. Perhaps the island has been exposed to the force of the drift ice and 'bulldozed' away.
- The GPS coordinates for the island's location are most likely inaccurate. GPS satellites are low on the horizon near the North Pole, which may cause GPS to yield inaccurate results.

In late 2004, the Eighth Edition of the National Geographic World Atlas was released. It clearly shows Oodaaq as the northernmost landmass on Earth. In August 2005 and 2006, Peter Skafte, Allen Deforest (satellite engineer), and Paul Lommen (physicist) conducted a search for new islands north of Greenland, using high-resolution satellite images.

Two sets of images were obtained, one year apart, to determine if any of the new islands had moved. One island was 64 m (210 ft) in diameter and visible on a satellite image, even without magnification. The team named it "Skafte Island" and posted it on a website. They also sent two reports about their findings to Hauge Anderson at the Danish Polar Center, one in 2005 and another in 2006. Dennis Schmitt was shown an image of "Skafte Island" before his departure with a group of people to North Greenland in 2007. He visited the island and made the claim that he had discovered a new northernmost island.

A number of other locations have since been called the northernmost point. In July 2021, scientists visited what they thought was Oodaaq, later discovering they had actually landed on a previously unknown island 780 metres (2,560 ft) north-west of Oodaaq. The island measures approximately 60 m × 30 m (197 ft × 98 ft), with a maximum elevation of around 3 metres (9.8 ft). The scientists proposed the island be called "Qeqertaq Avannarleq", Greenlandic for "the northernmost island". Rene Forsberg, head of geodynamics at the National Space Institute in Denmark, said Qeqertaq Avannarleq is not a true island, likely rock on ice, as are all the other islets north of Kaffeklubben.

In 2022, a Swiss-Danish expedition visited the area, to confirm the existence of the 2021 island and all previously discovered island and islets north of "Inuit Qeqertaat" (Kaffeklubben Island) at latitude 83°39 054″ N, 30°37 045 ″ W. Measurements by Martin Nissen from the Danish and Greenlandic national mapping agency and René Forsberg with DTU Space, Technical University of Denmark confirmed that all offshore islets north of Inuit Qeqertaat (Kaffeklubben Island) have been debris covered icebergs.

Oodaaq Island has therefore been removed from the official maps and the northernmost land point in the world is confirmed as the northern tip of Inuit Qeqertaat (Kaffeklubben Island) at latitude 83°39 054″ N, 30° 37 045″ W.

== See also ==
- Northernmost point of land
- Stray Dog West
- 83-42
- ATOW1996
