= Warming Land =

Peninsula in northern Greenland

- Location within Greenland

Geography
- Location: NW Greenland
- Coordinates: 81°37′N 52°00′W
- Adjacent to: St George Fjord; Hartz Sound
- Length: 102 km (63.4 mi)
- Width: 61 km (37.9 mi)
- Highest elevation: 1,253 m (4111 ft)
- Highest point: Rink Firn High Point

Administration
- Greenland (Denmark)

Warming Land is a peninsula in far northern Greenland. Administratively it is a part of the Northeast Greenland National Park. It was named after Danish botanist and ecologist Eugen Warming (1841 – 1924).

== Geography ==
Warming Land is located between Nyeboe Land and Wulff Land. It is bounded by St George Fjord and the Steensby Glacier on its western side, and Hartz Sound —a branch of the Sherard Osborn Fjord, as well as the Ryder Glacier on the eastern. Midgårdsormen, an unglaciated section of the peninsula, is located at the southern end and to the south of it lies the Greenland Ice Sheet. Warming Land has two large firn caps in its central part, the Daniel Bruun Firn and the Rink Firn covering the highest parts of the peninsula.

Map of the Nares Strait area.

== See also ==
- Firn

== Bibliography ==
- H.P. Trettin (ed.), Geology of the Innuitian Orogen and Arctic Platform of Canada and Greenland. Geological Survey of Canada (1991) ISBN 978-0660131313
