= 83-42 =

Small island in the Arctic Ocean

Coordinates: 83°42′05.2″N 30°38′49.4″W

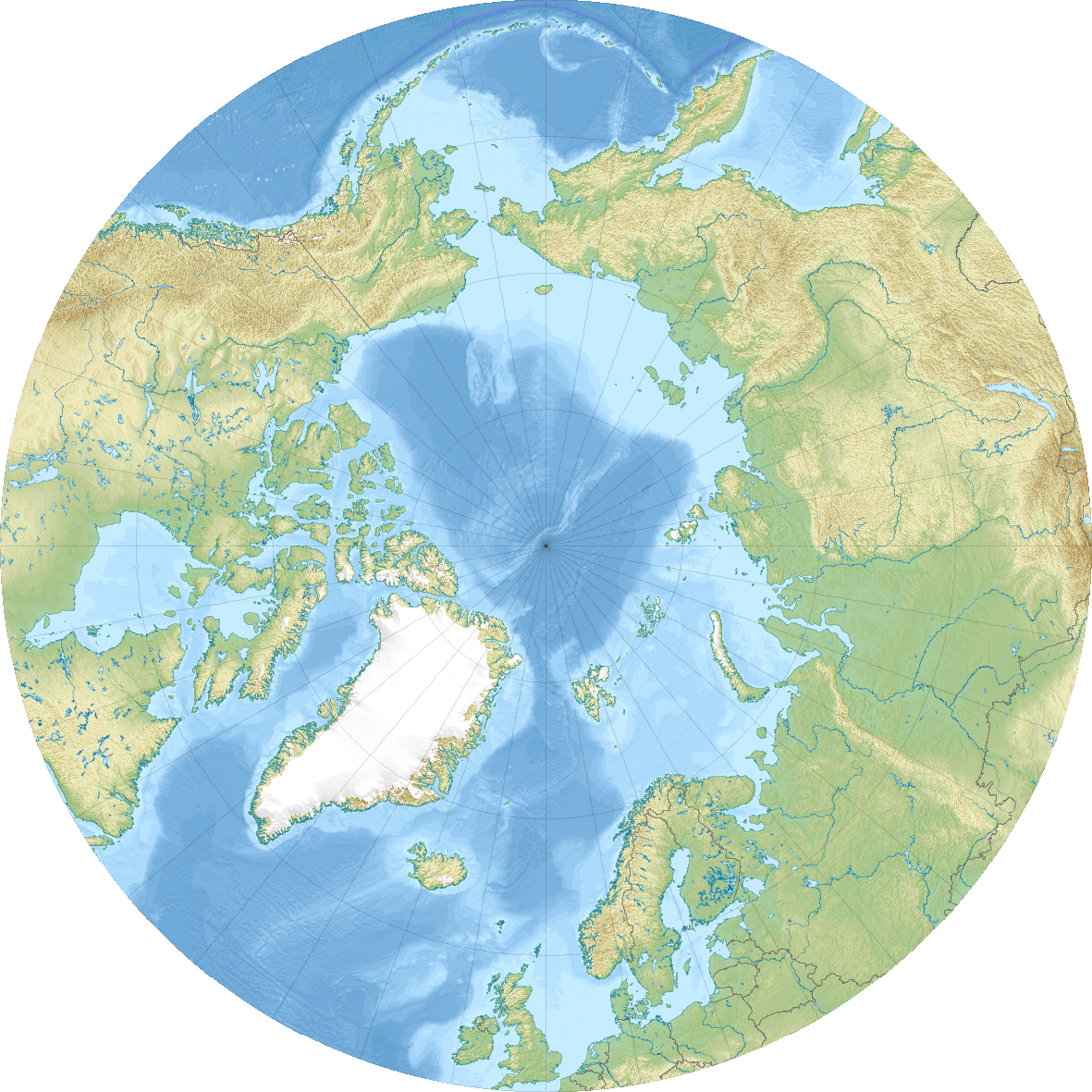
Location of 83-42 Island

83-42 is a rocky ice floe in the Arctic Ocean. It is also sometimes referred to as Eklipse 0, or Schmitt’s Island, after its discoverer, Dennis Schmitt. It measures 35 by 15 metres (115 by 49 ft) and 4 metres (13 ft) in height, and lies 699.8 kilometres (434.8 mi) from the North Pole. When it was discovered in 2003, lichens were found growing on it, suggesting it was not one of the temporary gravel bars commonly found in that region.

The island was discovered on 6 July 2003 by an American expedition led by Dennis Schmitt and Frank Landsberger. The expedition members gave it the unofficial name 83-42, reflecting its latitude of 83 degrees 42 minutes north.

One definition of a permanent island can be found in the United Nations Convention on the Law of the Sea, which states that "an island is a naturally formed area of land, surrounded by water, which is above water at high tide." Given its very small size, it is doubtful whether 83-42 has this property. According to its discoverer, 83-42 is composed of rocks and boulders, a relatively resistant material, and is not just a fleeting sand and gravel bank. The height of about four metres (13 feet) above the water surface could indicate that 83-42 is a permanent island given the weak tidal effect in the Arctic Ocean.

A bathymetric survey in 2022 determined that all gravel banks north of Kaffeklubben are likely not connected to the seafloor, but rather gravel on top of the sea ice, confirming Kaffeklubben as the northernmost true land in the world.

In most geography books, Kaffeklubben Island is still listed as the northernmost point of land. If 83-42 is granted status as land, it will be the northernmost land area on Earth. Since the classification of a land area as an island is not dependent on the size of the land area, 83-42 would also become the most northerly island in the world. Other islands which have been proposed as the northernmost include ATOW1996, RTOW2001, and Oodaaq. However, these are not thought to be permanent islands, but rather semi-permanent gravel banks, moved around by waves and ice floes.

== See also ==
- Northernmost point of land
