= Ryder Glacier (Greenland) =

Glacier in Greenland

- Ryder Gletscher
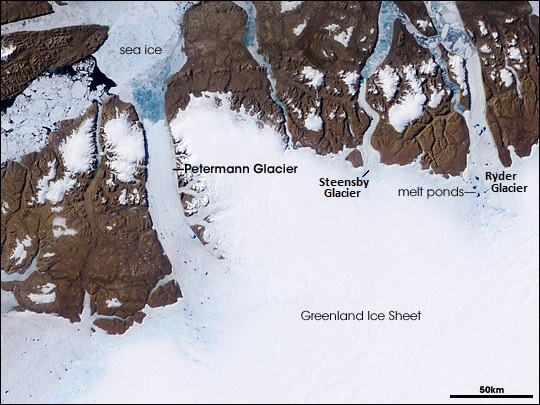
- The Ryder Glacier with its melt ponds in a NASA picture

- Location within Greenland
- Type: Tidal outlet glacier
- Location: Greenland
- Coordinates: 81°38′N 49°10′W
- Length: 80 km (50 mi)
- Width: 19 km (12 mi)
- Terminus: Sherard Osborn Fjord; Lincoln Sea

Ryder Glacier (Danish: Ryder Gletscher), is one of the major glaciers in northern Greenland.

This glacier was first mapped by Lauge Koch in 1917 during Knud Rasmussen's 1916–1918 Second Thule Expedition to north Greenland and was named after Danish Arctic explorer Carl Ryder.

== Geography ==
The Ryder Glacier originates in the Greenland Ice Cap. It is roughly north–south oriented and has its terminus at the head of the Sherard Osborn Fjord between Permin Land and Warming Land. It is 30 km long and is a floating tongue within the fjord.

Map of part of Ellesmere Island and far Northern Greenland.

== Bibliography ==
- Anthony K. Higgins, North Greenland Glacier Velocities and Calf Ice Production

== See also ==
- List of glaciers in Greenland
