= ATOW1996 =

Island

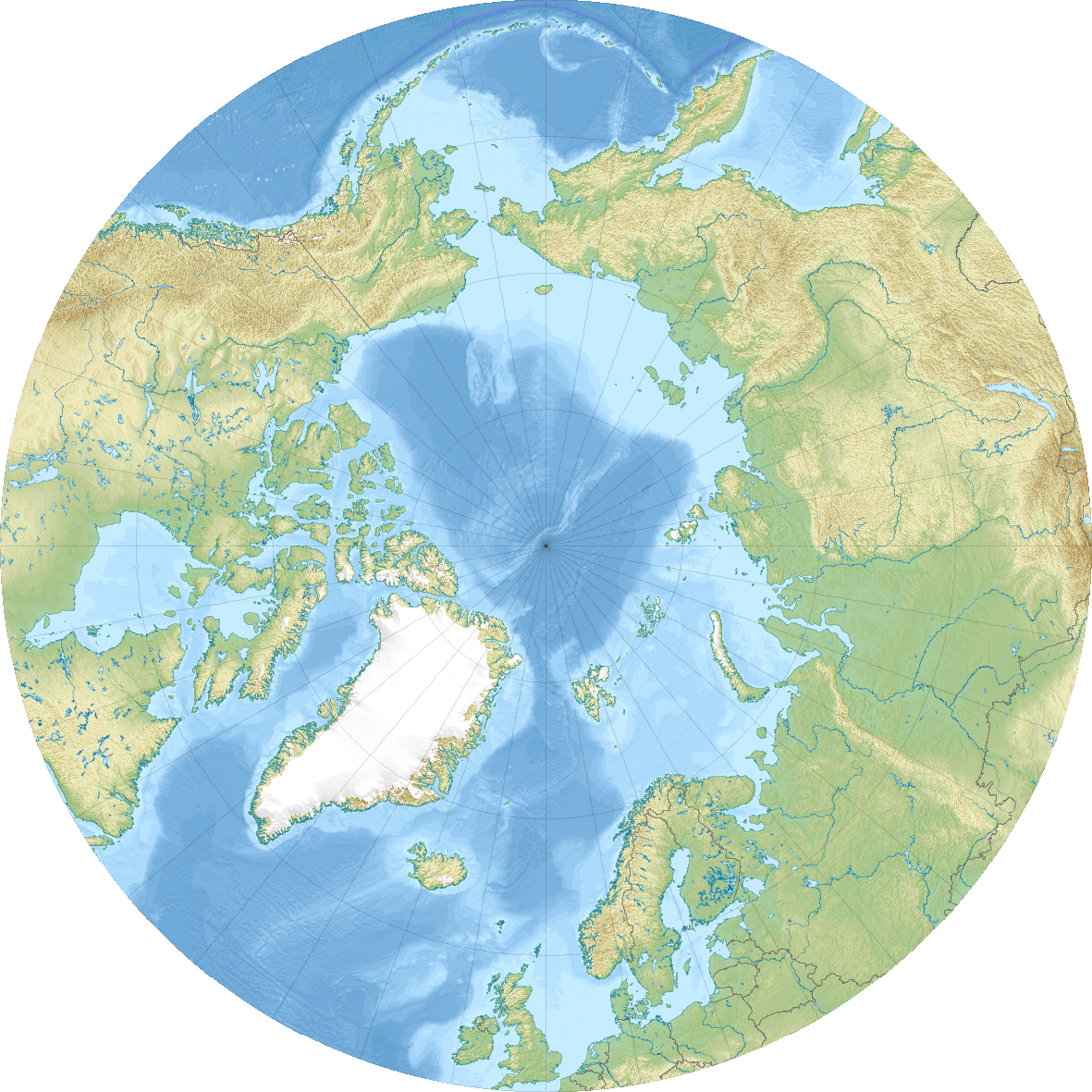
Location of ATOW1996 Island

ATOW1996 was one of the places formerly considered as a potential northernmost documented points of land on Earth. It was a small patch of gravel about 10 metres (33 feet) long and one metre high, located several miles north of Cape Morris Jesup in northern Greenland at 83°40′34.8″N 30°38′38.6″W. It was discovered by and named after the (American) Top of the World Expedition of 1996, but appears to have been non-permanent, likely a patch of gravel and boulders on ice from elsewhere.

A non-permanent island even farther north—at 83°41′06″N 30°45′36″W—was noted in a Twin Otter flyover by the 2001 Return to the Top of the World Expedition (RTOW2001). This expedition also confirmed the continuing existence of ATOW1996, however later study suggests it is not a true island (see below).

For years, Kaffeklubben Island, discovered in 1921 by Danish explorer Lauge Koch at 83°40′N 29°50′W, was thought to be the northernmost point of land. In 1977, however, a Danish expedition discovered Oodaaq Island further north at 83°40′N 30°40′W. The American Top of the World Expedition of 1996 was able to locate what they thought was Oodaaq Island, but doubts remain because of the inconsistency between the island they reached, "ATOW1996," and those recorded by the original discoverers of Oodaaq. The coordinates for ATOW1996 are actually further north than those for Oodaaq, so it currently holds the record for the most northerly point of land. Another island, called 83-42, was found at 83°42′05.2″N 30°38′49.4″W. It is tiny, measuring about 35 by 15 metres (115 by 49 feet) and 4 metres (13 feet) high.

Ultimately, however, a bathymetric survey in 2022 determined that all gravel banks north of Kaffeklubben are likely not connected to the seafloor, but rather gravel on top of the sea ice, confirming Kaffeklubben as the northernmost true land in the world.
