= Cape Bryant =

Cape on the northern coast of Greenland

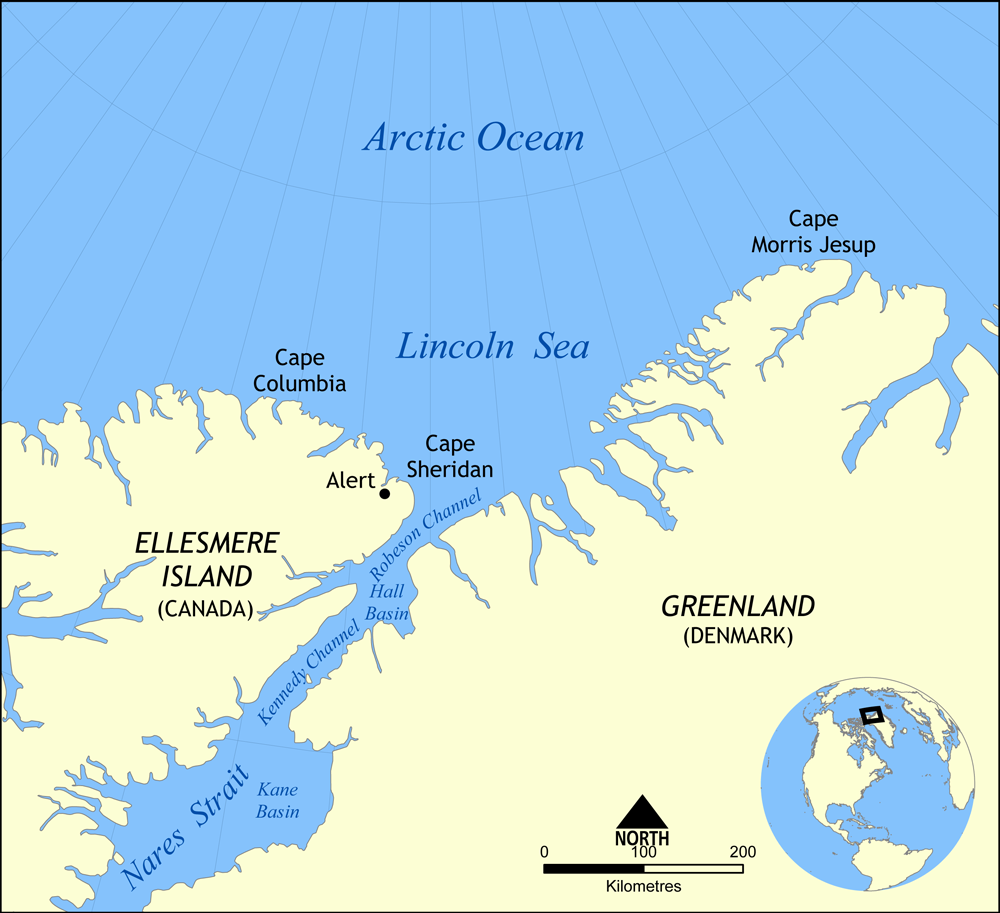
Map of Cape Bryant (unmarked), Cape Sheridan, the Robeson Channel, and the Lincoln Sea.

Cape Bryant is on the northern coast of Greenland, marking the northeastern extent of the Robeson Channel where it joins the Lincoln Sea in the Arctic Ocean, at 82°22′N 55°8′W.
