= Hendrik Island =

Island in Greenland

Native name: Hendrik Ø
- Location of Hendrik Island in Greenland
- Interactive map of Hendrik Island
- Etymology: Named after Arctic explorer Hendrik Olsen

Geography
- Location: Lincoln Sea
- Coordinates: 82°03′N 52°46′W
- Area: 583 km^{2} (225 sq mi)
- Area rank: 14th largest in Greenland
- Length: 46 km (28.6 mi)
- Width: 8 km (5 mi)
- Highest elevation: 1,152 m (3780 ft)

Administration
- Greenland
- Unincorporated area: NE Greenland National Park

Demographics
- Population: 0 (2021)
- Pop. density: 0/km^{2} (0/sq mi)
- Ethnic groups: none

Hendrik Island is an island in far northern Greenland. Its area is 583 km^{2}. It is part of the Northeast Greenland National Park.

The island is named after Inuit Arctic explorer Hendrik Olsen, who was a member of Knud Rasmussen's Second Thule Expedition 1916–1918. He disappeared on the island during a hunt in July 1917.

== Geography ==
Hendrik Island is a large coastal island located east of Nyeboe Land, between Saint George Fjord to the west and Sherard Osborn Fjord to the east. Its southern end faces the mouth of Hartz Sound, off the Warming Land Peninsula. The northernmost headland of the island is Dragon Point. Smaller Castle Island lies in Saint Andrew Bay off the northeastern shore of Hendrik Island.

The island is largely unglaciated except for small glaciers. It is mountainous, with a peak at its northern end reaching 1152 m. The sea around the island is rarely free from ice.

Map of the Lincoln Sea area.

== See also ==
- List of islands of Greenland
- List of features in Greenland named after Greenlandic Inuit
