= Sherard Osborn Fjord =

Fjord in Greenland

- Location in Greenland
- Location: Arctic
- Coordinates: 82°15′N 52°6′W
- Ocean/sea sources: Lincoln Sea
- Basin countries: Greenland
- Max. length: 100 km (62 mi)
- Max. width: 15 km (9.3 mi)

Sherard Osborn Fjord is a fjord in northern Greenland. To the NNW, the fjord opens into the Lincoln Sea. Administratively it is part of the Northeast Greenland National Park.

This fjord was named after Royal Navy admiral and Arctic explorer Sherard Osborn (1822 – 1875).

== Geography ==
It is a fjord with a wide mouth that opens to the NNW between Dragon Point at the northern end of Hendrik Island, and Cape May, at the northwestern end of Wulff Land. Hendrik Island forms the western shore of the fjord north of the Hartz Sound and smaller 520 m (1,710 ft) high Castle Island lies in Saint Andrew Bay off the northeastern shore of Hendrik Island. Sherard Osborn Fjord forms Wulff Land's western coastline and Hendrik Island forms part of the northern half of the facing shore, while the shore south of the Hartz Sound that separates the island from the mainland is part of Warming Land on one side and Permin Land on the other. The Hartz Sound connects the area of the head of the fjord with neighboring Saint George Fjord to the east.

The Ryder Glacier at the fjord's head discharges ice from the Greenland Ice Cap and fills most of the inner fjord as far as Wedge Island. At the head of the fjord, to the southwest of Wulff Land, lies Aage Bistrup Land, an unglaciated land area completely surrounded by the Ryder Glacier. 800 m (2,600 ft) high Cape V. Normann is at the northern end of Permin Land.

Map of the Lincoln Sea area.

== See also ==
- List of fjords of Greenland
