= Kaffeklubben Island =

Island off northern Greenland

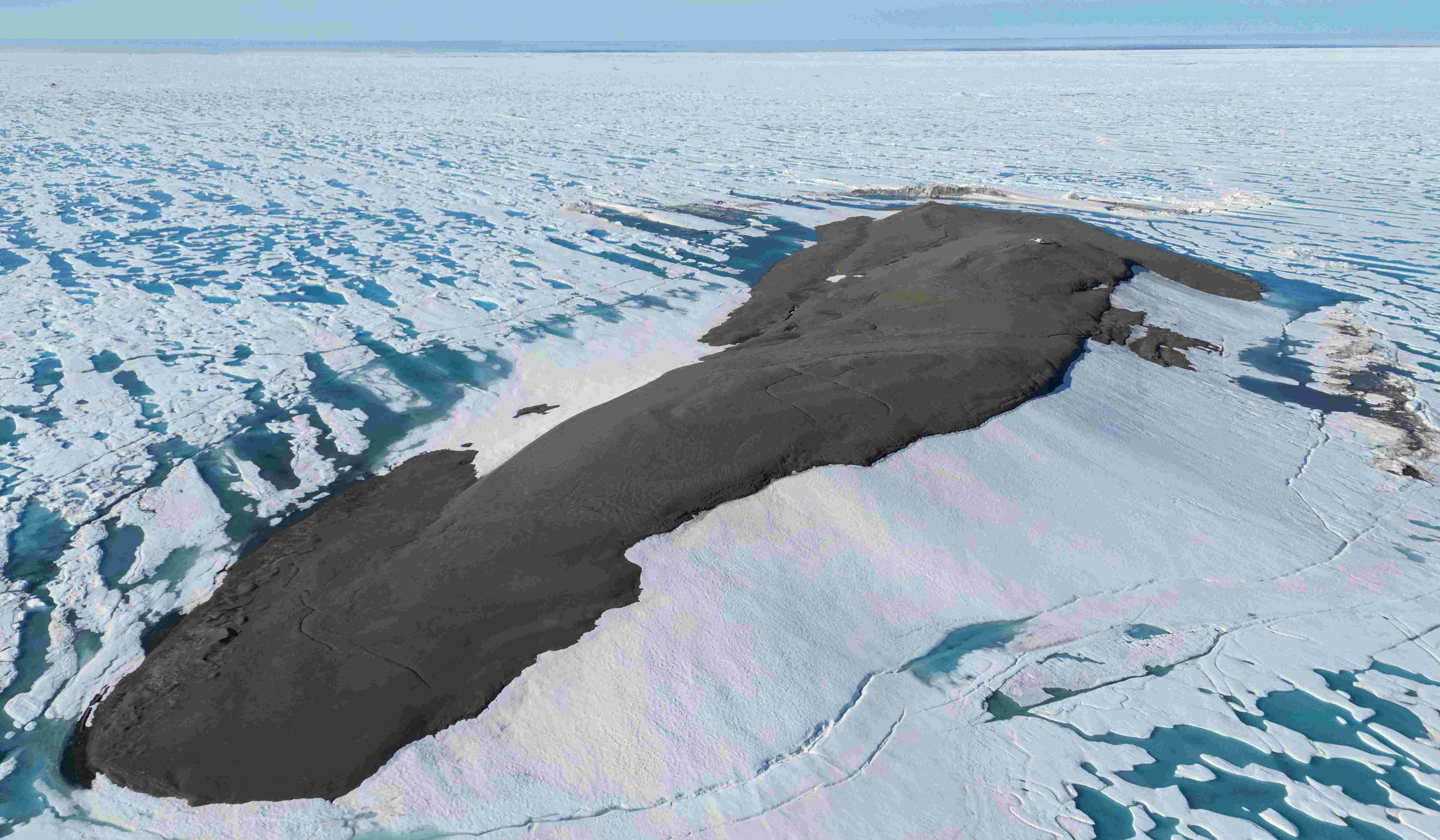
- Aerial photograph of Kaffeklubben Island, August 2022

- Location within Greenland

Geography
- Location: Greenland
- Coordinates: 83°39′45″N 30°36′50″W

Administration
- Denmark
- Northeast Greenland National Park

Demographics
- Population: Uninhabited

Additional information
- Time zone: UTC−02:00

Kaffeklubben Island or Coffee Club Island (Danish: Kaffeklubben Ø; Greenlandic: Inuit Qeqertaat) is an uninhabited island lying off the northern shore of Greenland. It contains the northernmost undisputed point of land on Earth.

== History ==
Kaffeklubben Island does not appear to have ever been inhabited. The northern part of Peary Land – known as Johannes J. Jensen Land – was at least visited by members of the Thule peoples, based on archaeological evidence found in 2023 near Bliss Bay, approximately 25 kilometres (15 mi) south. The nearest ruins from the older Independence I culture are located at Cape Bridgman, some 80 km (50 mi) to the southeast.

The first recorded sighting of Kaffeklubben Island was made by the American explorer Robert Peary in 1900, who believed that Cape Morris Jesup on the mainland was the world's northernmost point of land and who declined to name the island. The island itself was not visited until 1921, when the Danish explorer Lauge Koch set foot on the island and named it after the coffee club in the University of Copenhagen Geological Museum.

In 1969, a Canadian team calculated that the island's northernmost tip is 750 metres (2,460 ft) farther north than Cape Morris Jesup, the northernmost point of mainland Greenland, thus claiming its record as the most northerly point of land.

The Greenlandic name for the island, which means "island of the people", was bestowed by the journalist Peter Brandt after a 1991 visit to Kaffeklubben. It was authorised by the Greenland Place Name Committee in 1993.

In 2023, an American and Greenlandic team sponsored by National Geographic visited to study the flora and fauna, and establish the northernmost terrestrial ecosystem study in the world. They also discovered the world's northernmost Indigenous site (archaeological) on Greenland near this island.

=== Other claimants for northernmost land ===
Since its record as the northernmost point of land was established, several gravel banks have been discovered in the sea to the north of the island, such as Oodaaq, 83-42, and ATOW1996; however, there is debate as to whether such gravel banks should be considered for the record since they are rarely permanent, being swallowed regularly by the moving ice sheets, being shifted in tides, or becoming submerged in the ocean. A bathymetric survey in 2022 determined that all gravel banks north of Kaffeklubben are likely not connected to the seafloor, but rather gravel on top of the sea ice, confirming Kaffeklubben as the northernmost true land in the world.

== Geography and geology ==
A navigational chart of northern Greenland and Canada's Ellesmere Island; "Kaffeklubben Ø" is visible in the middle right.

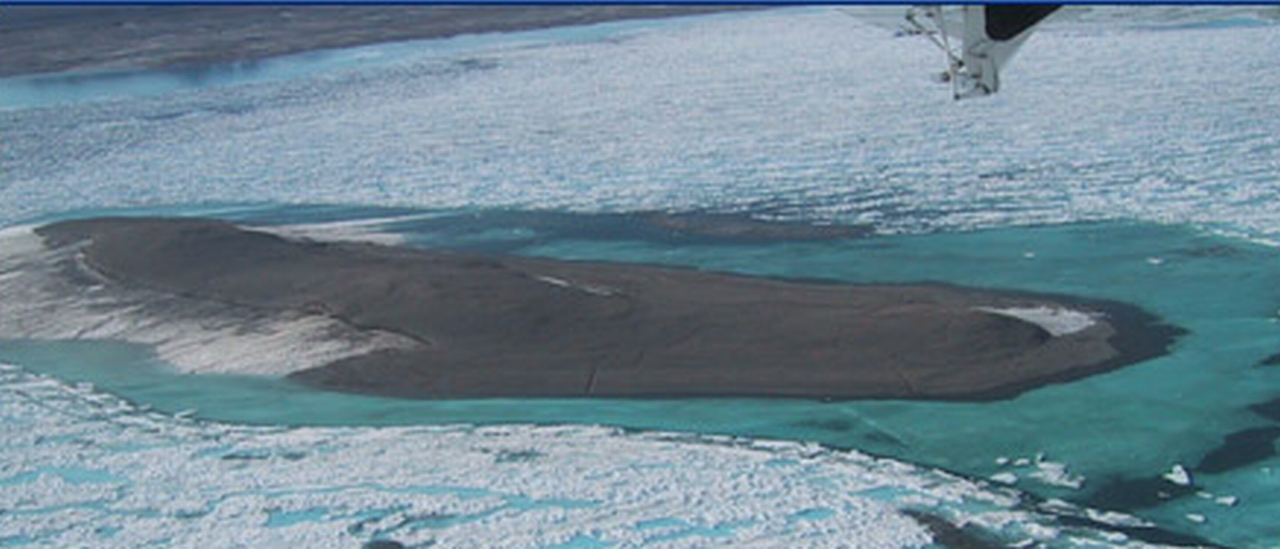
Aerial photograph of Kaffeklubben Island, September 2008

Kaffeklubben Island is 713.5 kilometres (443.3 mi) from the geographic North Pole. The island lies off Cape James Hill, 10 kilometres (6.2 mi) northwest of Bliss Bay, approximately 37 kilometres (23 mi) east of Cape Morris Jesup, a little east of a central point along the northern coast of Greenland. Its most northerly point is 4.4 km north of that of Cape Morris Jesup. It is approximately 700 metres (2,300 ft) long, and approximately 300 metres (980 ft) across at its widest point. The highest point is approximately 30 metres (98 ft) above sea level.

A 2022 visit to the island by a Swiss-Danish expedition confirmed the northern tip of Kaffeklubben Island at 83°39′54″N, 30°37′45″W to be the northernmost piece of land in the world.

=== Flora and fauna ===
Despite the harsh environment, vegetation grows on Kaffeklubben Island, including various mosses, liverworts, and lichens, and the flowering plants purple saxifrage (Saxifraga oppositifolia) and Arctic poppy (Papaver radicatum). The 2023 National Geographic expedition determined that the northernmost plants on the island were a patch of moss belonging to the species Tortula mucronifolia and an Arctic poppy. A stoat, nicknamed Randall, was also found.

== See also ==
- List of islands of Greenland
- List of northernmost items
