= Bommen (Svalbard) =

Islet

Coordinates: 76°58.8′N 21°55.5′E

Bommen (English: The Bar) is an islet west of Langåra in Tiholmane, part of Thousand Islands, an archipelago south of Edgeøya. At low water it is connected with Langåra, creating a bar that partially blocks access to Tofamnhamna (Two Fathoms Bay), the anchorage within Langåra, Kalvøya, Lurøya, Sperra, Bommen and Spunset.
