= Storfjorden (Svalbard) =

Fjord in Svalbard, Norway

Coordinates: 77°49′26″N 19°40′50″E

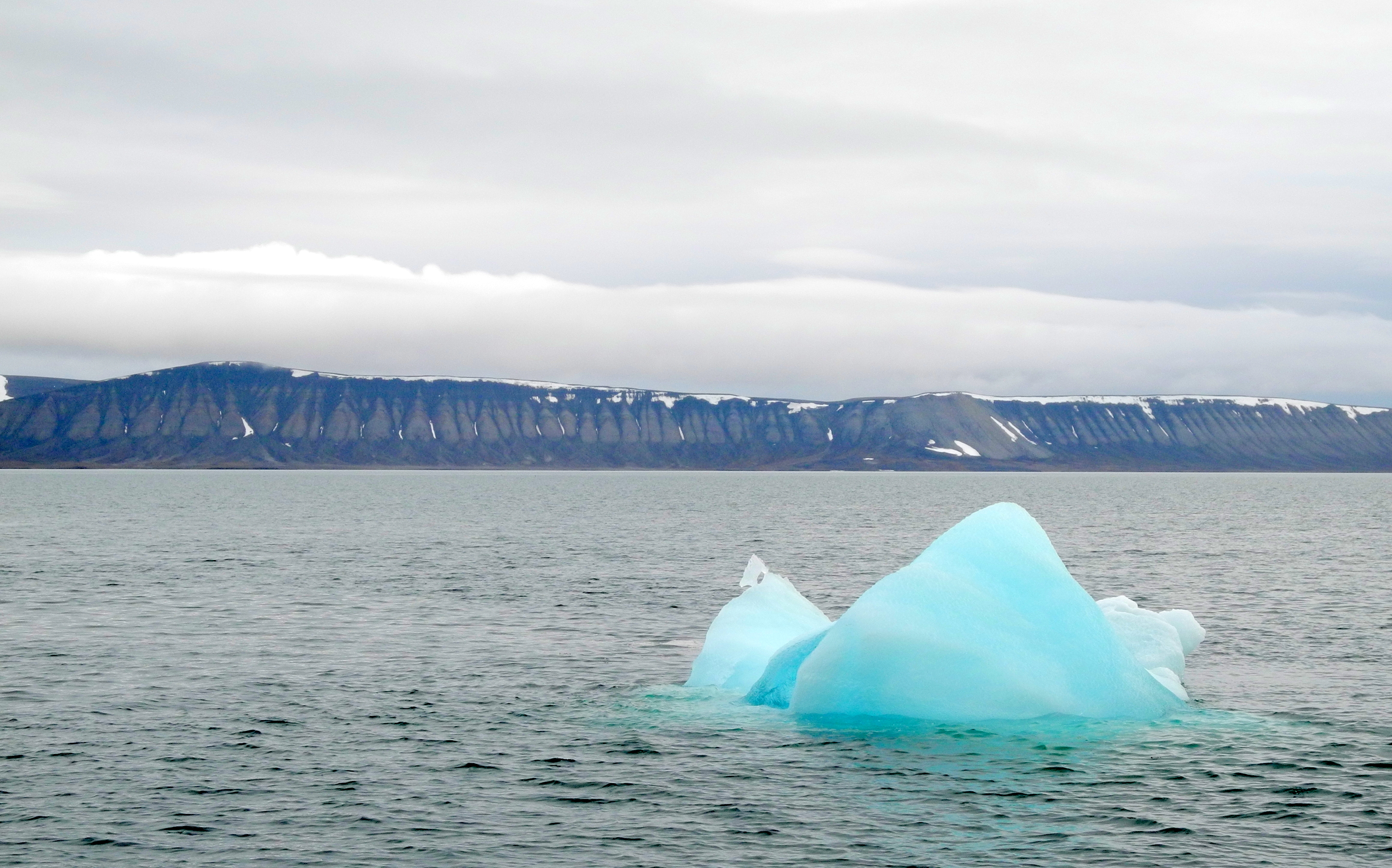
Ginevra Bay, the northern part of Storfjorden

Storfjorden (English: Great Fjord) is the body of water in the Svalbard archipelago in northern Norway separating Spitsbergen in the west from Barentsøya and Edgeøya to the east. Its southern limits are Kikutodden in Sørkapp Land east to Håøya, Tiholmane, Brækmoholmane, and Menkeøyane in Thousand Islands and northeast to Svarthuken—the southeastern promontory of Edgeøya. Its limits on its eastern side are Sundneset on the northern side of Freemansundet south to Palibinramten on the northwest coast of Edgeøya. The northern part is called Ginevra Bay, which lies between Olav V Land and Barentsøya. It ends at Heleysundet.

Storfjorden was historically known as Wybe Jans Water, named after the Frisian whaler Wybe Jansz van Stavoren. The fjord was first labelled as such in 1620.
