= Proppen =

Islet

Coordinates: 76°58.3′N 21°56.5′E

Proppen (English: The Plug) is a small islet in the sound (Sluket or "The Gully") between Langåra and Rullesteinøya in Tiholmane, part of Thousand Islands, an archipelago south of Edgeøya.
