= Røysholmen =

Islet

Coordinates: 76°57.7′N 21°55.5′E

Røysholmen (English: Heap of Stones Islet) is an islet between Rullesteinøya and Rugla in Tiholmane, part of Thousand Islands, an archipelago south of Edgeøya.
