= Andréetangen =

Headland of Edgeøya, Svalbard

Coordinates: 77.4067°N 22.6621°E

Andréetangen is a headland at the eastern side of Tjuvfjorden on the southwestern coast of Edgeøya, Svalbard. The headland is named after German geographer Karl Andrée. Off the headland are the two islands Zieglerøya and Delitschøya. Andréetangen lies within the Søraust-Svalbard Nature Reserve, and its low-lying tundra coastline is rich in biodiversity. It is known for its walruses which bask on the beach, and as a breeding ground for Arctic skua, Purple sandpiper, Arctic tern and snow bunting. A hut was built at Andréetangen by the polar bear trapper Henry Rudi in 1946.

== Location and geology ==
Andréetangen is situated on the eastern side of Tjuvfjorden on the southwest coast of Edgeøya (Edge Island) in southeastern Svalbard. There is a narrow sound between the headland and its nearest island which is shallow and has strong currents.

Edgeøya and Andréetangen are part of the Caledonian nappe system formed during the Caledonian orogeny (c. 490–390 Ma), involving thrust stacking of older terrains over a Precambrian basement.

== Biodiversity ==
Andréetangen lies within the Søraust-Svalbard Nature Reserve, and its low-lying tundra coastline is rich in biodiversity. The habitat is known for large walrus haul-outs, and they can often be seen basking on the beach. Ringed seal (Phoca hispida) are found in the area and are intimidated by the walrus population. Arctic skua, Purple sandpiper, Arctic tern and snow bunting breed in the area, and to the north is a breeding ground for king eider, red-throated diver, grey phalarope and long-tailed duck. Plant species such as turf saxifrage, common scurvy weed and wood rush are found here.

== Hut ==
The old trainer's hut was built in 1946 by the polar bear trapper Henry Rudi, and Thor Larsen later added a small laboratory at the hut, which has since been removed. Larsen named the site "Permafrost City". The entrance roof was notably damaged in August 2014.
