= Alka (Svalbard) =

Norwegian islet in the Thousand Islands archipelago

Coordinates: 77°08′N 22°46′E

Alka (English: The Auk) is a Norwegian islet between Gassen and Havella in Menkeøyane, part of Thousand Islands, an archipelago south of Edgeøya.
