= Sletteøya =

Island in Norway

Coordinates: 76°58.6′N 22°04.5′E

Sletteøya (English: Plain Island) is an island between Tiholmane and Schareholmane in Thousand Islands, an archipelago south of Edgeøya, Svalbard, Norway.
