= Håungen =

Island in Svalbard, Norway

Coordinates: 76°52.8′N 21°39′E

Håungen is a small islet north of Håkallen in Kulstadholmane, the southernmost group of islets in the Thousand Islands, an archipelago south of Edgeøya. Its name derives from a neighboring island.
