= Kulstadholmane =

Norwegian islands in Svalbard archipelago

Coordinates: 76°52.4′N 21°44′E

Kulstadholmane (Svalbard)

Kulstadholmane (English: Kulstad Islands or Kulstad Islets) is the southernmost group of islets in Thousand Islands, an archipelago south of Edgeøya. It comprises Håøya and the skerries or islets surrounding it: Håungen, Håkallen and Håkjerringa. The islets are named after the Norwegian sealing skipper Johan Kulstad, who was shipwrecked in Storfjorden in 1853 before being rescued by the Danish skipper Schau.

== Geography ==
Kulstadholmane is the southernmost group of islets in the Thousand Islands (Tusenøyane) archipelago, situated south of Edgeøya in Svalbard, Norway. This cluster forms part of the broader Svalbard archipelago in the Arctic Ocean, characterized by its remote, icy waters and rugged terrain typical of high-latitude island groups. The islets are named after the Norwegian sealing skipper Johan Kulstad, whose ship wrecked in nearby Storfjorden in 1853.

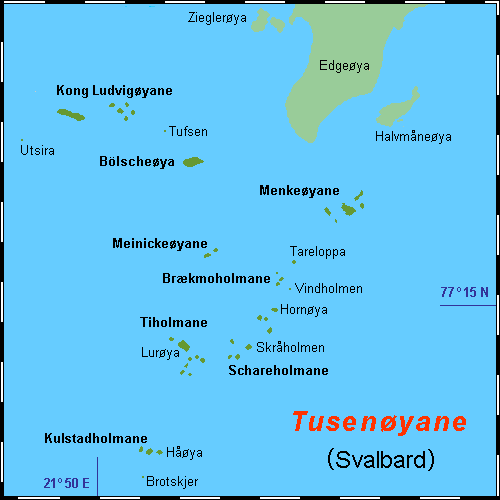
Kulstadholmane (bottom left of map)

As part of the Southeast Svalbard Nature Reserve, Kulstadholmane falls within the protected Barentsøya–Edgeøya landscape management area, which safeguards approximately 6,400 km^{2} of land and 15,426 km^{2} of marine territory across Edgeøya, Barentsøya, Tusenøyane, and adjacent islands. This designation emphasizes the region's ecological integrity, limiting human activity to preserve its natural state.

== History ==
The first sightings of the Kulstadholmane islands occurred during the 17th century as European explorers sought bowhead whale populations migrating near the archipelago. Dutch and English whalers operated under charters like the Muscovy Company and the Noordsche Company. These charters ventured eastward from Spitsbergen to hunt in these waters. Logs from the 1620 noteing temperery camps on nearby islets.

The name "Kulstadholmane" derives from Norwegian, honoring sealing skipper Johan Kulstad, whose vessel wrecked in adjacent Storfjorden in 1853 before his rescue by Danish skipper Schau; English maps of the 19th century referred to similar features as "Kulstad Islets." This naming reflects the ongoing maritime activity in the area, indirectly linked to earlier explorers like William Scoresby, who in 1820 charted nearby Arctic waters and popularized the "Thousand Islands" label for the group during his whaling and scientific voyages. The designation became official in 1960, proposed by geologist Anders K. Orvin.

By the early 1900s, as Norway sought to assert claims over the unclaimed archipelago, government-funded expeditions under leaders like Gunnar Isachsen (1909) and Adolf Hoel (from 1910) focused on topographical mapping, geological surveys, and place-naming across Svalbard, including southeastern regions like Tusenøyane; these efforts were instrumental in supporting Norway's sovereignty recognition via the 1920 Spitsbergen Treaty.
