= Tjuvfjordlaguna =

Lagoon in Svalbard, Norway

Coordinates: 77.5445°N 22.7908°E

Tjuvfjordlaguna is a lagoon at Edgeøya, Svalbard. It is located just inside the head of Tjuvfjorden, at the southeast side of the valley Dyrdalen, and northwest of Schneiderberget. The glacier Deltabreen debouches into the lagoon.
