= Russebuholmane =

Four islets

Coordinates: 77°17′N 21°22.5′E

Russebuholmane are the four westernmost islets in Kong Ludvigøyane, part of Thousand Islands, an archipelago south of Edgeøya. The largest is Ækongen. The three outermost islands are collectively called Russeholmane (English: Russian Islets). They are named after a Russian trapper's hut found on one of the islets. One of the three is named Russeholmen (English: Russian Islet).
