= Skråholmen =

Island in Svalbard, Norway

Coordinates: 77°00.8′N 22°21.5′E

Skråholmen (English: Sloping Island) is an islet about 2 miles (3 km) northeast of Schareholmane. It is part of Thousand Islands, an archipelago south of Edgeøya.
