= Søraust-Svalbard Nature Reserve =

Nature reserve in Svalbard, Norway

- IUCN category Ia (strict nature reserve)
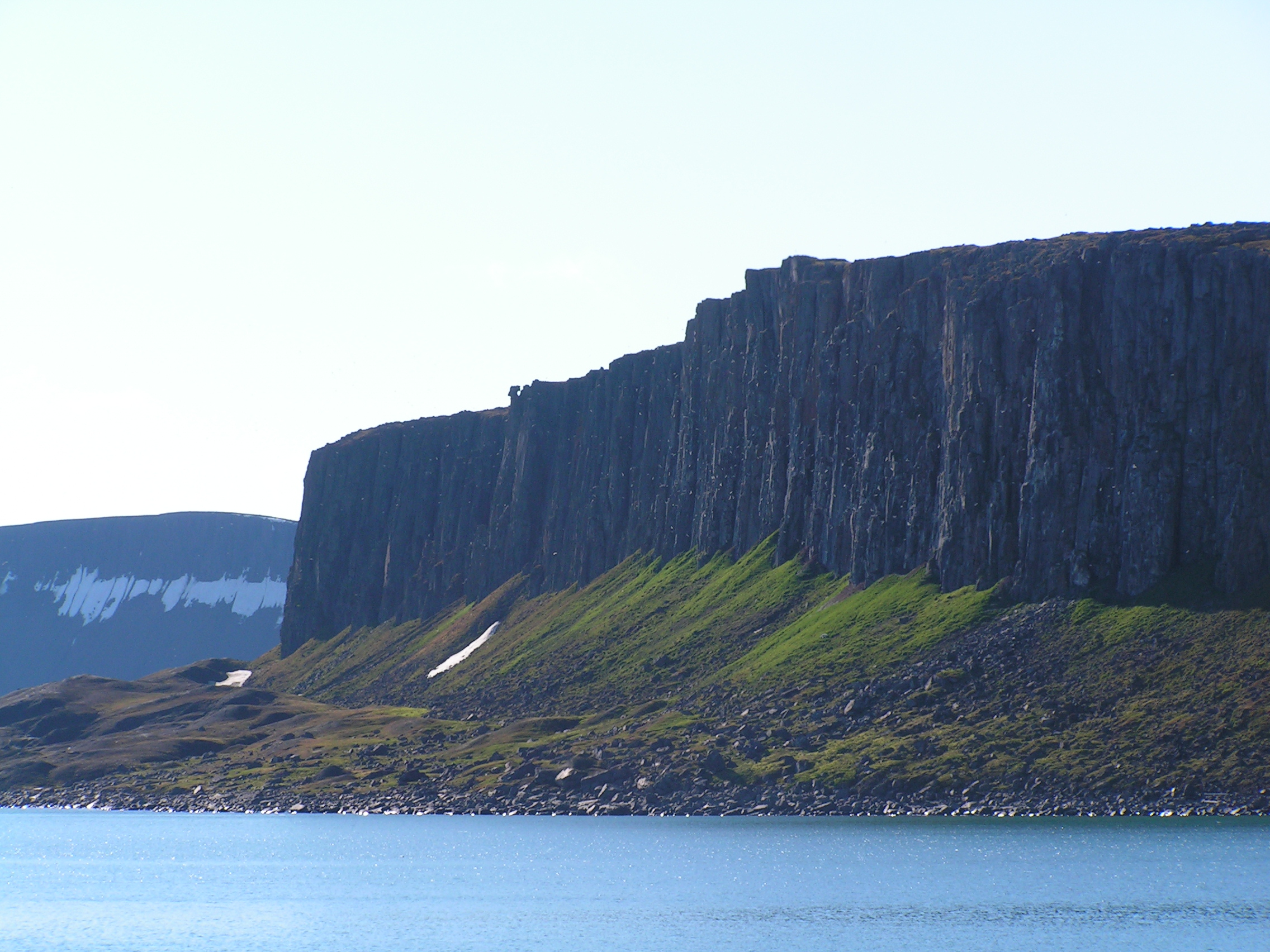
- Dorst Bay on Barentsøya

- Location: Svalbard, Norway
- Nearest city: Longyearbyen
- Coordinates: 78°N 22°E
- Area: 21,825 km^{2} (8,427 sq mi), of which 6,400 km^{2} (2,500 sq mi) is land 15,426 km^{2} (5,956 sq mi) is water
- Established: 1 July 1973
- Governing body: Norwegian Environment Agency

Søraust-Svalbard Nature Reserve (Norwegian: Søraust-Svalbard naturreservat) is located in the south-eastern part of the Svalbard archipelago in Norway. The nature reserve covers all of Edgeøya and Barentsøya in addition to a number of smaller islands, including Thousand Islands, Ryke Yseøyane and Halvmåneøya. The reserve is 21,825 square kilometres (8,427 sq mi), of which 6,400 square kilometres (2,500 sq mi) is on land and 15,426 square kilometres (5,956 sq mi) is on water—making it the second-largest preserved area in Norway (including national parks). The reserve has been protected since 1 July 1973 and borders the Nordaust-Svalbard Nature Reserve to the north.

== Description ==
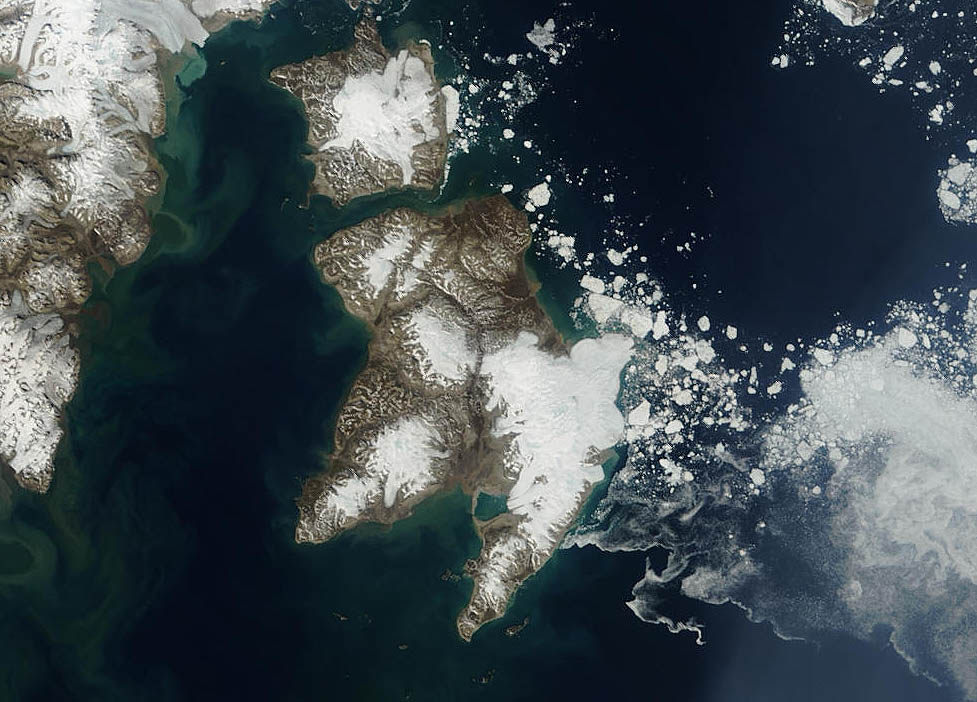
Edgeøya (bottom) and Barentsøya (top)

The reserve is dominated by strandlines and patterned ground, although large sections are glaciated. On Edgeøya, many areas have raised beach deposits, giving distinct strandline, and showing whale bones formerly below sea level. The most popular tourist destinations within the reserve are Kapp Lee, Diskobukta and Halvmåneøya. There is an all-year visitation ban on Zieglerøya, Delitschøya, Spekkholmen, Haudegen and large parts of Halvmåneøya.

== Flora and fauna ==
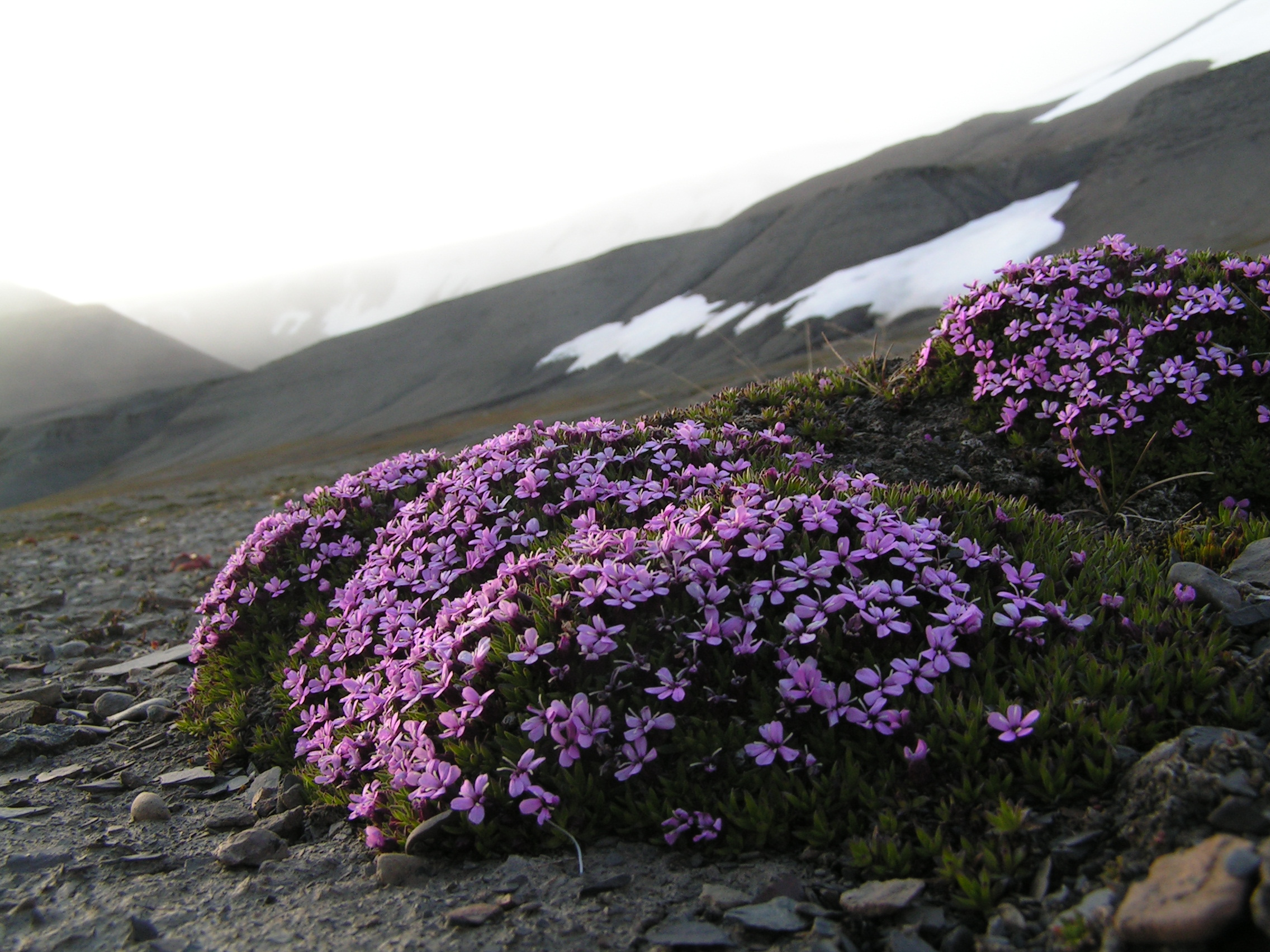
Silene acaulis on Barentsøya

Traditionally, the area has been used for trapping polar bear and walrus; remains of trapper buildings remain at Ekrollhamna. The reserve contains the most important resting places for walrus in the archipelago. The area also features a lot of reindeer, and is used as a nesting places for birds. On Thousand Islands is a core area featuring red-throated divers, brent geese and Arctic terns. The vegetation is moss tundra, formed by centuries of accumulated reindeer excrement.

The reserve has been identified as an Important Bird Area (IBA) by BirdLife International because it supports breeding populations of barnacle and brent geese, king eiders. purple sandpipers and glaucous gulls.
