= Halvmånesundet =

Coordinates: 77.2883°N 23.0166°E

Halvmånesundet is a strait between Halvmåneøya and Edgeøya, Svalbard. It is located east of the peninsula with the headland Svarthuken. The strait has a width of about 1.8 nautical miles at the narrowest point.
