= Tufsen =

Islet of Tusenøyane, Svalbard, Norway

Coordinates: 77°09.2′N 21°32.5′E

Tufsen (English: The Insignificant Person) is an islet 1.2 miles (1.9 kilometres) east of Utsira, part of Thousand Islands, an archipelago south of Edgeøya.
