= Trønderen =

Islet in Svalbard, Norway

Coordinates: 77°04′N 22°29.5′E

Trønderen (English: the person from Trøndelag) is an islet in Brækmoholmane, part of Thousand Islands, an island group south of Edgeøya. The island is named after Trøndelag, Norway, the birthplace of Sivert Brækmo (1853–1930), a Norwegian sailor and fishermen who regularly visited Svalbard between 1876 and 1895.
