= Vesle Meinickeøya =

Island in Svalbard, Norway

Coordinates: 77°07′N 22°05.5′E

Vesle Meinickeøya (English: Little Meinicke Island) is the smaller of the two islands that comprise Meinickeøyane, part of Thousand Islands, an island group south of Edgeøya.
