= Deltabreen =

Glacier in Svalbard, Norway

Coordinates: 77.5807°N 23.1528°E

Deltabreen (The Delta Glacier) is a glacier at Edgeøya, Svalbard. The glacier debouches into the lagoon of Tjuvfjordlaguna, at the eastern side of Dyrdalen.
