= Arendtsøya =

Island near Svalbard

Coordinates: 77°10′N 21°30′E

Arendtsøya (English: Arendts Island) is a small island in Kong Ludvigøyane, part of Thousand Islands, an island group south of Edgeøya. The island is named after the German geographer Karl Arendts (1815–81).
