= Havmerra =

Island in Svalbard

Coordinates: 76°59.7′N 22°15′E

Havmerra (English: The Sea Horse) is an island in the eastern part of Schareholmane, part of Thousand Islands, an archipelago south of Edgeøya. Sea horse is an old name for the Walrus. The island harbors the most important population of this species in the southeastern region of Svalbard.
