= Kvalpyntfjellet =

Mountain in Svalbard, Norway

Coordinates: 77.4666°N 20.9069°E

Kvalpyntfjellet is a mountain at Edgeøya, Svalbard. It has a height of 461 m.a.s.l., and is located at the headland of Kvalpynten, at the northern side of Tjuvfjorden.
