= Brotskjer =

Island in Svalbard, Norway

Coordinates: 76°50′N 21°03′E

Brotskjer (English: Surf Skerry) is a rock about 11 miles (17 km) west-southwest of Håøya in the southern part of Thousand Islands, an archipelago south of Edgeøya.
