= Håkjerringa =

Island in Svalbard, Norway

Coordinates: 76°52.5′N 21°40′E

Håkjerringa (English: The Greenland Shark) is an islet on the western coast of Håøya in Kulstadholmane, part of Thousand Islands, an archipelago south of Edgeøya. A large number of Greenland sharks inhabit the waters around the island.
