= Delitschøya =

Island off Andréetangen at the eastern side of Tjuvfjorden, at Edgeøya, Svalbard

Coordinates: 77.3804°N 22.5155°E

Delitschøya is an island off Andréetangen at the eastern side of Tjuvfjorden, at Edgeøya, Svalbard. It is located nearby the island Zieglerøya. The island is named after geographer Otto Delitsch.
