= Kvalbeinøya =

Island

Coordinates: 76°59.6′N 22°11.5′E

Kvalbeinøya (English: Whale Bone Island) is the northwesternmost island in Scareholmane, part of Thousand Islands, an archipelago south of Edgeøya. The island derives its name from the fact that plains on the western side of the island (and part of the northern side) are covered with whale bones.
