= Vindholmen =

Islet in Svalbard, Norway

Coordinates: 77°02.5′N 22°33′E

Vindholmen (English: "Wind Island" or "Wind Islet") is a small islet southeast of Brækmoholmane, part of Thousand Islands, an island group south of Edgeøya.
