= Blåmåken =

Island in Norway

Coordinates: 77°11′N 22°56′E

Blåmåken is the northeasternmost island in Menkeøyane, part of Thousand Islands, a Norwegian archipelago south of Edgeøya.
