= Store Brækmoholmen =

Island of Brækmoholmane, Svalbard, Norway

Coordinates: 77°04′N 22°28′E

Store Brækmoholmen (English: Great Brækmo Island) is the largest island in Brækmoholmane, part of Thousand Islands, an island group south of Edgeøya. The island is named after Sivert Brækmo (1853–1930), a Norwegian sailor and fishermen who regularly visited Svalbard between 1876 and 1895.
