= Bruno Hassenstein =

German cartographer

Bruno Hassenstein (23 November 1839 – 27 August 1902) was a German cartographer born in Ruhla.

From 1854 he worked and studied cartography under August Petermann in Gotha. Here he drew numerous maps for Petermann's geographical journal, Mittellungen, and became known for his outstanding work performed on maps of Africa. In 1866 he relocated to Berlin, where one of his duties was cartographical work for Karl Klaus von der Decken's Reisen in Ostafrika.

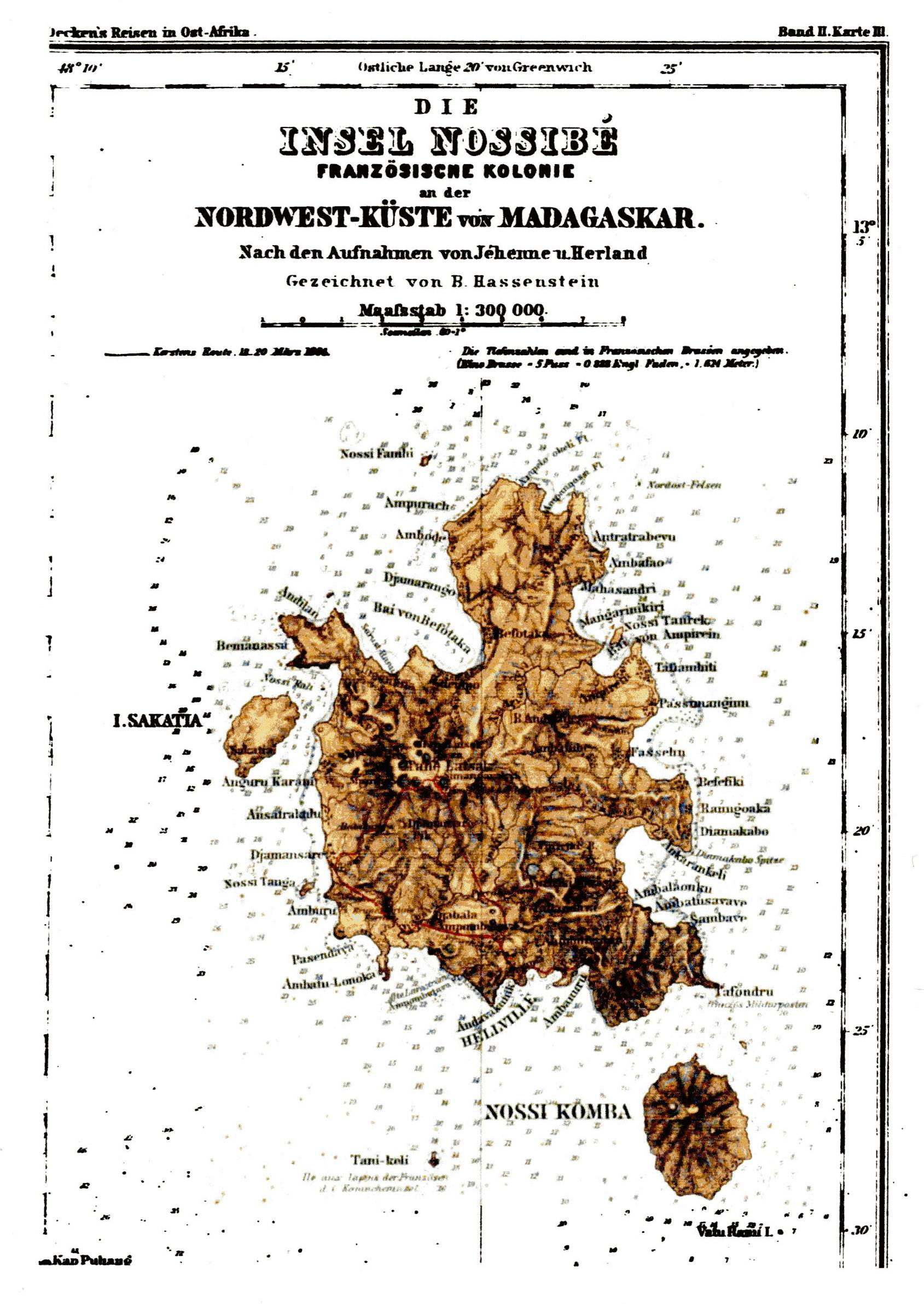
Map of Nosy Be from Reisen in Ost-Afrika in den Jahren 1859 bis 1865; drawing by Hassenstein

In 1868 Hassenstein returned to Gotha, where he created maps for Heinrich Theodor Menke's edition of Spruner's atlas of medieval history (Handatlas für die Geschichte des Mittelalters und der neuern Zeit). In 1878 he became editor of the cartography section of the Mittellungen, and in 1885 performed mapmaking work for the Atlas von Japan, a highly regarded work containing charts that were drawn to 1:100000 scale.

During his career Hassenstein edited and published maps based on the observations of explorers and travelers (Wilhelm Junker, Emin Pasha, Hans Meyer, Ernst Marno, Friedrich Gerhard Rohlfs, Oskar Baumann, Friedrich Bohndorff and Sven Hedin). In 1887 he was awarded an honorary doctorate from the University of Göttingen.
