= Håkallen =

Island in Svalbard, Norway

Coordinates: 76°52.6′N 21°39′E

Håkallen is a small islet west of Håkjerringa in Kulstadholmane, part of Thousand Islands, an archipelago south of Edgeøya.
