= Islomen =

Small island in Norway

Coordinates: 77°08′N 22°48′E

Islomen is a small rocky island, or skerry, in the southeastern part of Menkeøyane, part of Thousand Islands, a Norwegian archipelago south of Edgeøya.
