= Store Meinickeøya =

Island in the Svalbard archipelago

Coordinates: 77°06.5′N 22°04.5′E

Store Meinickeøya (English: Great Meinicke Island) is the largest island in Meinickeøyane, part of Thousand Islands, an island group south of Edgeøya.
