= Bruhnsøya =

Island in Svalbard, Norway

Coordinates: 77°10′N 21°30′E

Bruhnsøya (English: Bruhns Island) is a small island in Kong Ludvigøyane, an island group in Thousand Islands, an archipelago south of Edgeøya. The island is named after the German astronomer Carl Christian Bruhns (1830–81).
