= Peter Schenk =

Peter Schenk may refer to:

- Peter Schenk the Elder (baptized 1660, died 1711–1713), German engraver and cartographer
- Peter Schenk the Younger (1693–1775), Dutch engraver and map publisher
