= Blokkøya =

Island in Svalbard, Norway

Coordinates: 76°59.2′N 22°11′E

Blokkøya (English: Block Island) is an island in the southwestern part of Scareholmane, an island group in Thousand Islands, an archipelago south of Edgeøya.
