= Loango Slavery Harbour =

Republic of the Congo cultural site

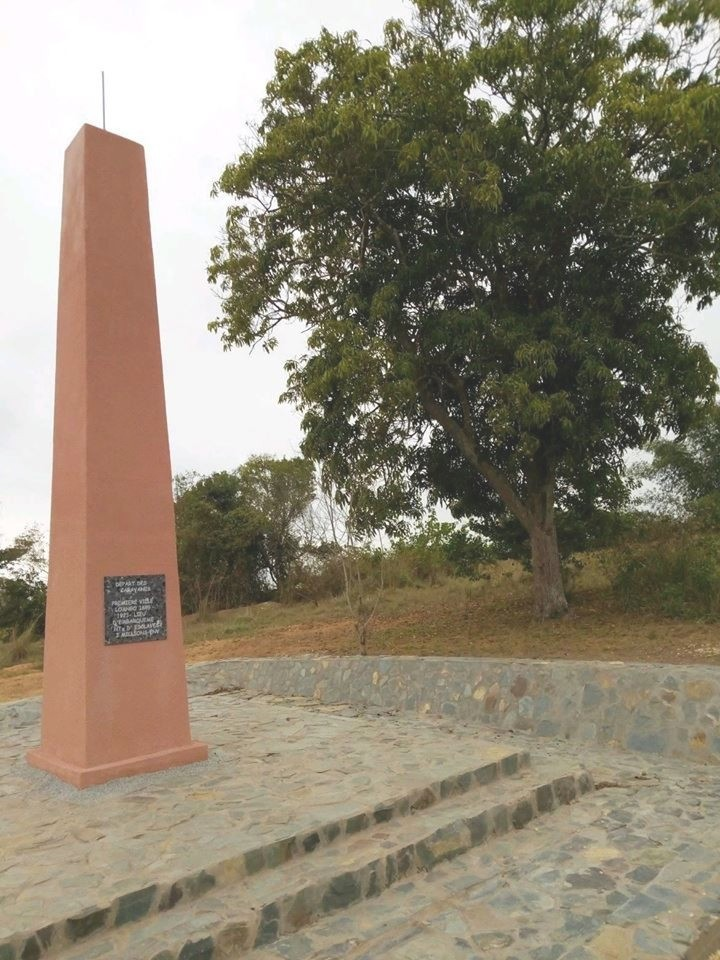
The site, a commemoration the Africans who were taken to the Americas,

The Loango Slavery Harbour (French: Ancien port d'embarquement des esclaves de Loango) is a Republic of the Congo cultural site included in World Heritage Tentative Lists in 2008 and 2009.

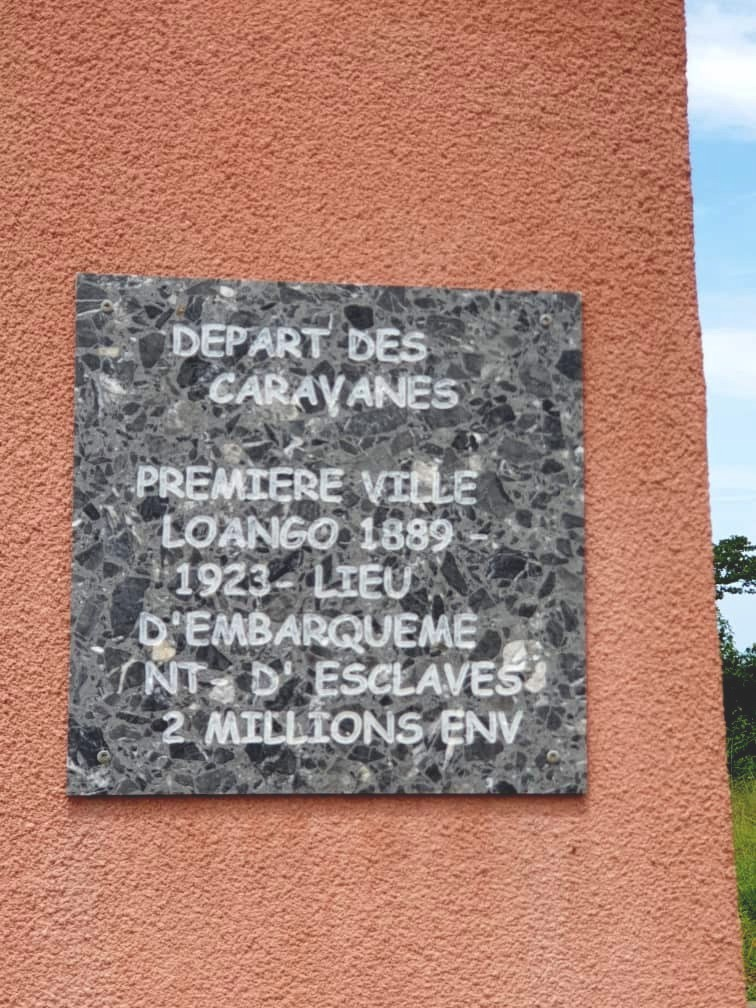
Stele to remember the number of Africans who were taken to the Americas, Republic of the Congo

It is part of the Hinda district, in Kouilou department. This site is limited by: Pointe Indienne to the Southeast, Atlantic Ocean to the South and to the Southwest, to the North-West the village of Matombi and to the northeast the small town of Diosso, the former administrative district of Bwali, capital of the Kingdom of Loango.

It is overlooked by the ancient lagoon of Tchibete that the relentless marine erosion has almost completely erased. Herbaceous vegetation is dominated by small-sized trees, with sandy soil influenced by the marine climate.

== History ==
From 1500 to 1867, the vessels in the Atlantic slave trade moved nearly 12.5 million African slaves from the coast of Africa to the Americas and the Caribbean.

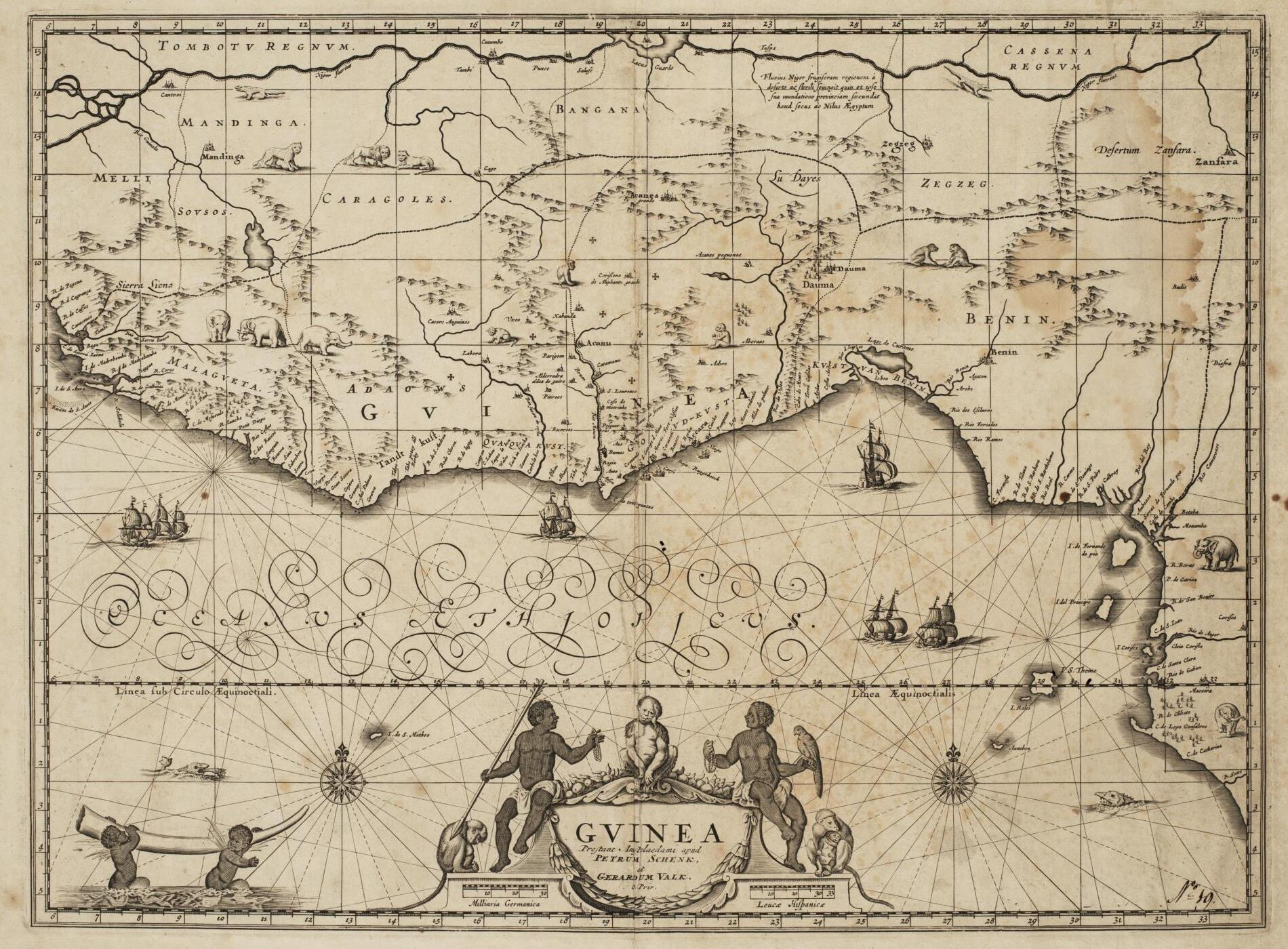
Gulf of Guinea map - Peter Schenk the Elder (1660 - 1718); Gerard Valck (1652 - 1726).

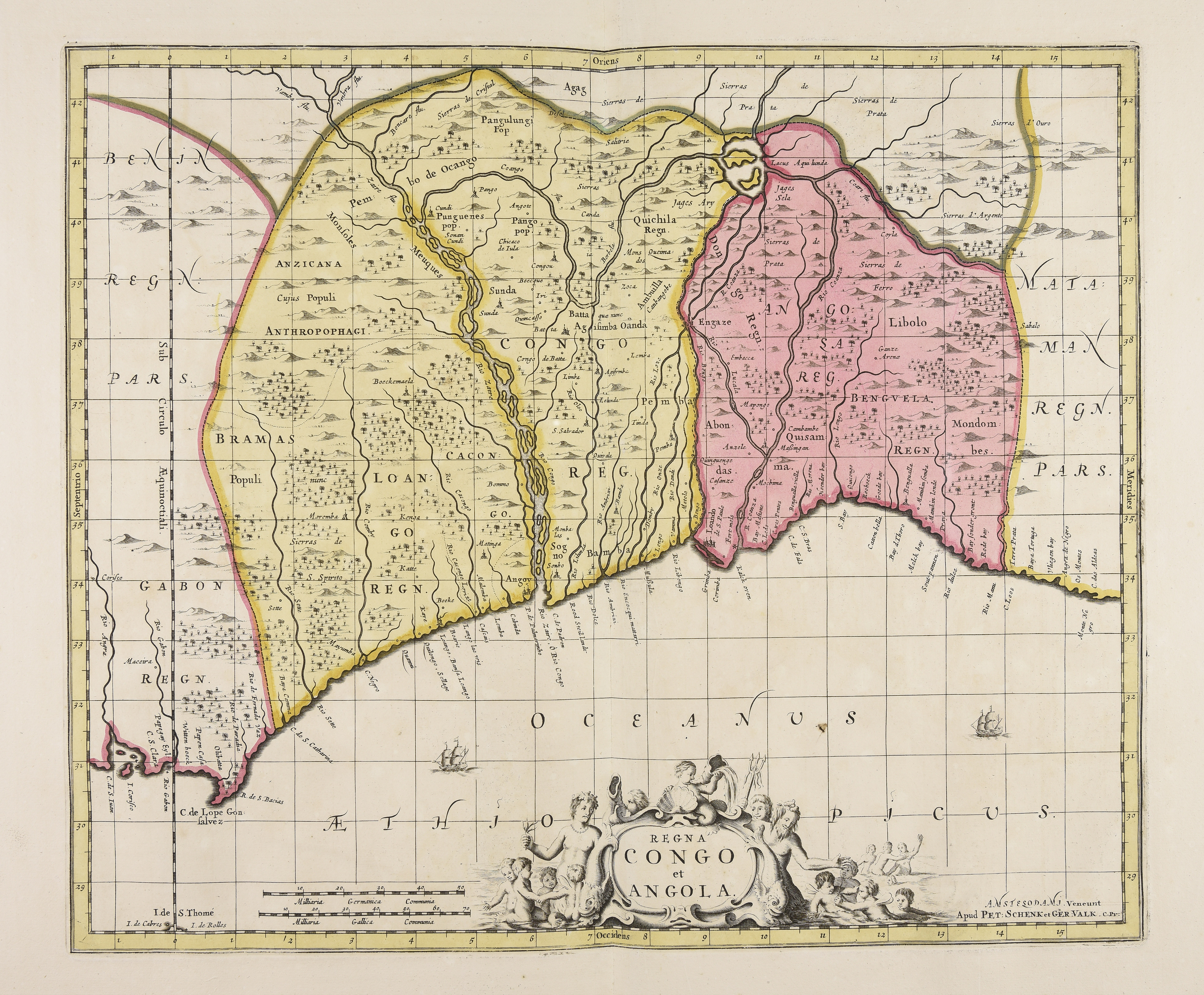
Kingdom of Loango and Kongo map - Peter Schenk the Elder (1660 - 1718); Gerard Valck (1652 - 1726).

The below table summarizes the various slave boarding points on the African coasts, as well as an estimate of the corresponding number of slaves.

Rank	Boarding area	Captive numbers	Percentage
1	Loango Coast and Angola Coast	5694574	45.48
2	Bight of Benin	1999060	15.97
3	Bight of Biafra (and other islands of Gulf of Guinea)	1594560	12.73
4	Gold Coast	1209321	9.66
5	Senegambia	755713	6.04
6	Eastern coast and Indian Ocean islands	542668	4.33
7	Sierra Leone	388771	3.10
8	Ivory Coast	336868	2.69
–	Total	12,521,300	100.00

Despite its importance as a site of intercultural exchanges in the modern world and its major contribution to the development of the Atlantic world through the transatlantic slave trade, the study of the coast of Loango did not have a lot of interest from scholarships. Phylis Martin is one of them.

An interesting literature has existed since the years 1980. However, it focused on the southern part of the mouth of the Congo River, namely Angola, dominated by the Portuguese. Focusing on Portuguese activities and archives, these studies have obscured the operation of trade in the Loango coast, a kind of "free zone" where local, British, French and Dutch merchants played a key role.

If we combine the numbers of Central Africa (Angola and Loango) and those of the East Coast, we find that nearly 6.2 million of slaves (about half of the total) are from countries speaking Bantu languages. The different ports of Central Africa are:

- Loango coast
  - Cabinda
  - Congo river mouth (Rio Zaïre), dividing line between Loango and the Angolan regions
  - Kiloango
  - Loango bay
  - Malemba
  - Mayumba
  - Mpinda on the southern bank of Congo river
- Angolan coast
  - Ambona
  - Ambriz, just below Mpinda on the South on Loge river
  - Benguela
  - Benguela Velho (Old Benguela)
  - Kwanza river
  - Novo Redondo
  - Quicombo
  - Salinas
  - Luanda, one of the most important ports with over 1.3 million slaves shipped from the 16th to the 19th century.

Due to the number of captives passing through its site to the Americas, the former port of embarkation of Loango slaves is one of the most important in the Gulf of Guinea. More than 2 million slaves from the areas that today constitute Chad, Angola, southern Gabon, Democratic republic of the Congo and the current territory of the Republic of the Congo, would have transited through this site.

=== Free Trade Area ===
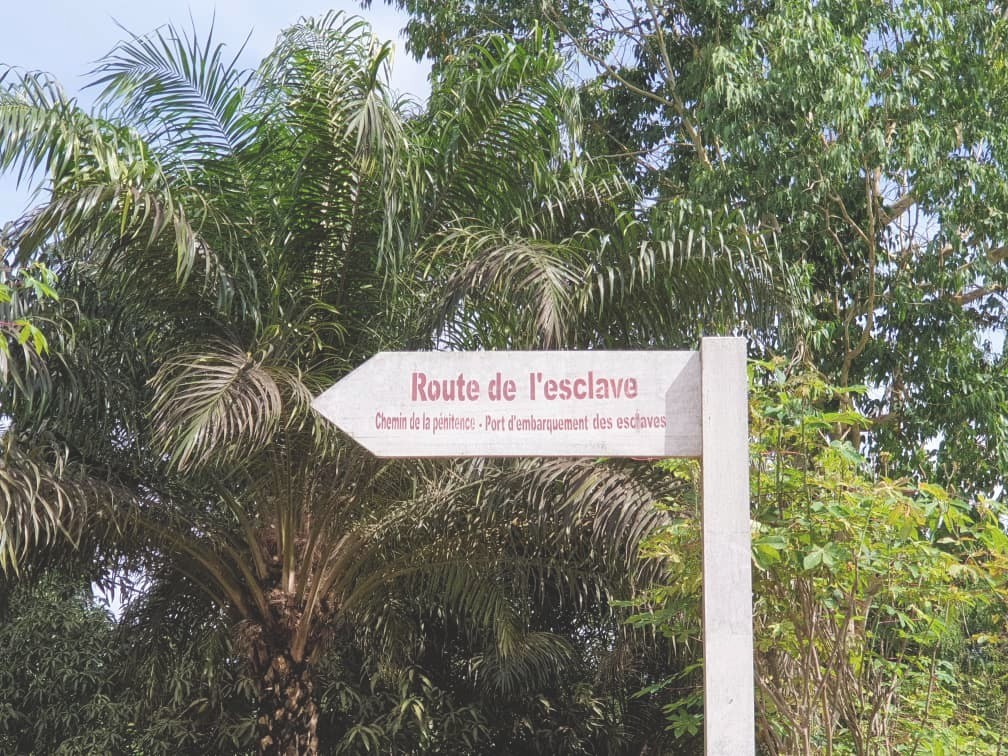
Slave route, Bay of Loango, Republic of the Congo

Before 1660, the Europeans travelled to the coast of Loango to obtain supplies of fabrics, ivory, rare wood (okoume, Padouk) and elephant tails.

The fabrics particularly played an essential role in the everyday life of the inhabitants. In addition to their roles in furniture and clothing, the cloths were used in the ceremonies of induction, initiation and burial and also as a currency of exchange.

One of the important access points for foreign traders of the 17th century was the commercial port of the Bay of Loango, located about ten kilometres (6.2 mi) from Bwali, the capital of the kingdom of Loango. They were then escorted to Bwali in hopes of being granted an audience with the Maloango, or meeting with royal officials (Mafouk) to negotiate the terms of the exchange.

In parallel, the Kingdom of Loango maintained trade with its neighbours from within. The access roads constituting this network were to the north the road to Mayumba, the Pool Malebo to the east and to Luanda to the south, passing through the kingdoms of Ngoyo and Kakongo. These are the famous caravan routes.

From 1650, the influence of raffia fabrics will decrease to the benefit of fabrics imported from Europe and the West Indies. The Dutch traders, newcomers to the coast of Loango, little interested in raffia, preferred to exchange slaves, ivory or copper in exchange for Western cloths and garments. These latest were quickly adopted by the notable Loango, in addition to the usual attributes such as leopard skins or other royal adornments.

Between 1660 and 1867, the foreign trade in goods was definitively replaced by that of men. It was the Kingdom of Loango that set the rules in its exchanges with the French, English or Dutch merchants, by making the competition between them. The merchants of Loango preferred their manufactured products compared to those of the Portuguese, as they found them to be better quality and cheaper. With their interests threatened, in particular by the Portuguese, the kingdom di not hesitate to recall that it was master on its own territory and that it traded with whoever it pleased. To violate local rules was to take the risk of retaliation for the offender (death, or delay in supplying the ships with goods...).

In the meantime, during which the mechanisms of this long-running trade were established, at least 475,000 slaves integrated the triangular trade flows, from the ports of the Loango coast (Loango Bay, Malemba and Cabinda Bay) 1.3 million additional captives leaving the same ports were recorded between 1811 and 1867 on board Portuguese, Brazilian and American ships. This made the coast of Loango one of the five most important African zones of triangular trade.

=== Factories ===
The factories at that time corresponded no less to a warehouse than to a branch of the parent company, which the European trader used as outpost to store the goods disembarked from the boat, before selling them or storing the slaves in waiting for the trip to the Americas. However, suspicious of the Portuguese and their role in the destabilization of their neighbour, the Kingdom of Kongo, from the forts installed along the Angolan coast, the Kingdom of Loango did not accept permanent installation of factories.

However, between 1608 and 1612, thanks to the interpersonal skills of Pieter van den Broecke, Dutch merchants installed factories in Mayumba and on Loango Bay to provide copper and ivory spikes.

In the face of Dutch competition, in 1624, Souza, the Portuguese governor of Luanda, asked the Maloango to close the competing factories. and expel the Dutch. On the other hand, the governor promised to buy all the stocks of ivory and copper, to provide better quality products, to ensure his protection in the event of an enemy invasion and finally to send Jesuit priests to baptize the Ma Loango. Ma Loango retorted that he would continue to trade with both parties under the same conditions and that he had no intention of converting to Catholicism.

Thus, Loango remained in control of its territorial integrity by controlling its economic relations, religious with the Atlantic powers. With its political and economic ascent, the area of influence of the Loango extended northward. At the end of the seventeenth century, with the disparting of the Kingdom of Kongo, the Loango also extended its influence towards the south by inaugurating a new model of road networks.

== Modern history ==
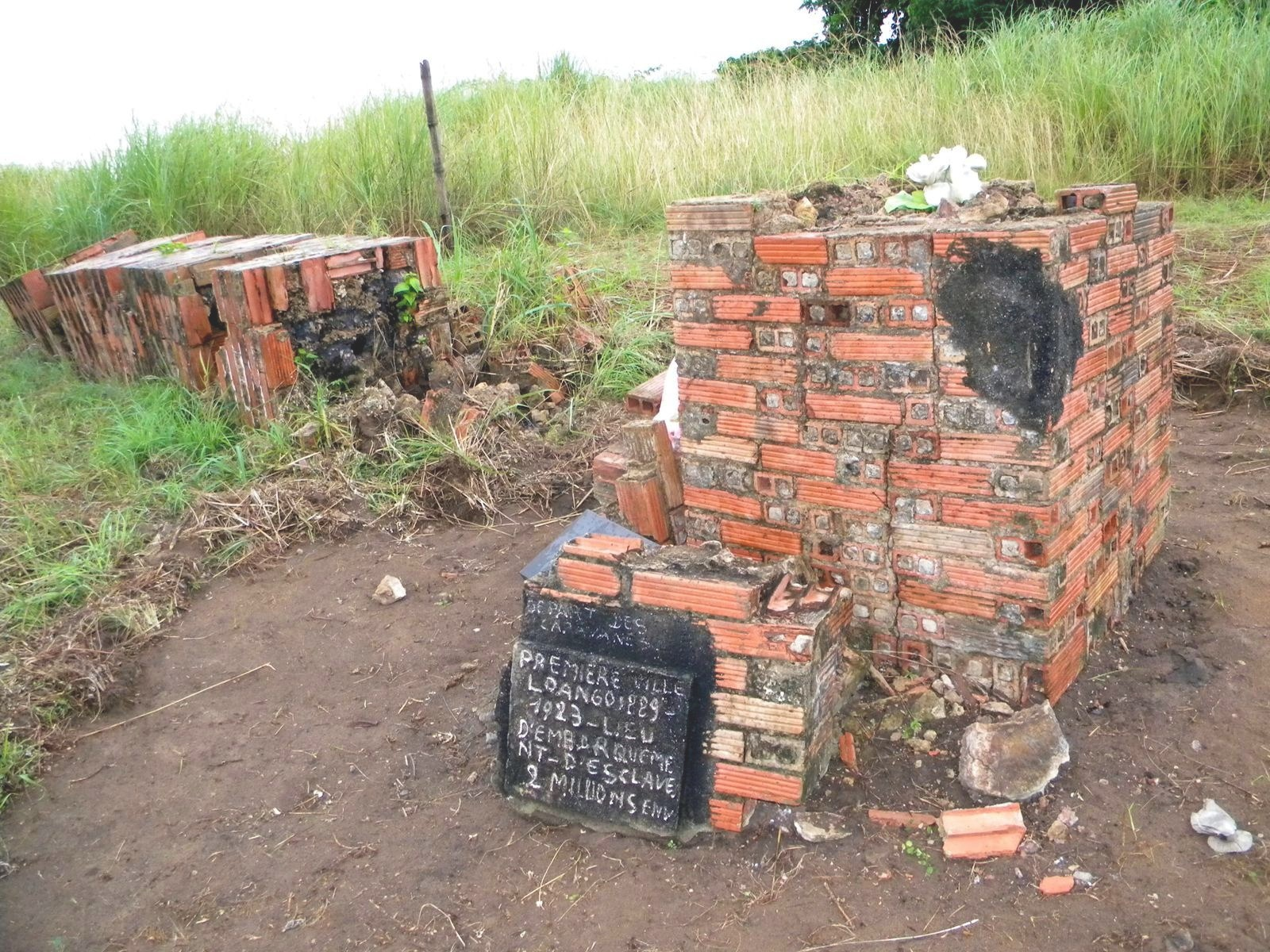
Old stele to remember the number of Africans who were taken to the Americas, Republic of the Congo

Joseph Kimfoko Madoungou (who has since a well-deserved retirement), is the former curator of the Museum of Diosso, located nearby, and has served as a guide to visitors to the harbour. Over the years he has perpetuated, with modest means, the memory of this place which has become the sanctuary of wild vegetation.

The port still keeps the remains of the transatlantic trade:

- A stele erected in 1897 by the French explorer Pierre Savorgnan de Brazza, symbolizing materially the location of the caravans ' departure and, at the same time, the large market of all transactions. The stele of about 7 meters high, or at least what's left of it, lost in the tall grass, collapsed alone in February 2002, for lack of maintenance.
- The three mango trees that served as counters before the ritual around the tree of oblivion.
- The tree for the ritual of oblivion and the one for the return: The slaves chained, made seven laps of this tree for women or young girls, and nine laps for men. The return tree symbolized a possible return of the spirit of the deceased to Loango when he died in the Americas;
- The jetty, which was a mudflat, served by a grass-filled runway, remains represented by a calm portion that resists marine erosion. In fact, the shallow Loango Bay did not allow boats to dock. They were throwing the anchor 30 kilometers offshore.
- The double row of mango trees 30 meters high about, three centuries old, delimiting the last path trodden by the captives in their final approach to the Atlantic Ocean. This road runs along the ridge of a hill and turns abruptly towards the Atlantic, so that the approach to the sea is done in a straight line and ends on the side of cliffs before the ocean.

mango trees (Mangifera indica L.) are a powerful symbol of the slave trade. In fact, these trees were first transported to Central and western Africa in the cargo of Portuguese ships of the fifteenth and sixteenth centuries from their original domestication centres, India and Southeast Asia. The arrival of Mango in Africa, and then in Brazil, was part of a world trade of exotic fruits that included pineapple (Ananas comosus), banana (Musa), guava (Psidium Guajava), to name but a few examples.

From the point of view of tradition, Father Raphael Nzaou, the head of the Catholic mission of Loango provides two explanations on the symbolic and origin of these mango trees. In the first, it describes how the slaves, in their march to the coast, have dropped the nuclei of mangoes which then turned into mango trees along the way. Mangoes thus symbolized their last African meal before they left for the Americas, which was under the understanding as a death. In the second explanation, the abbot tells how those who had remained on the land of Loango, planted a mango tree as a memorial of the missing near. He adds that, always nowadays, it is common to plant a tree on the funeral site of a deceased person.

In addition, the historical and emotional burden of this site is always noticeable. It is indeed the place where there are always several rites of induction and funeral of the Mâ Loango, the kings of the Kingdom of Loango.

The cultural importance of this site is also noticeable through the laments always sung by the inhabitants who remained on this sinister place, recalling the nostalgia of the descendants, remained to wait for loved ones torn from their affection and that they will never see again. Thus, the former port of embarkation, which has become a veritable sanctuary for its historical burden, is a key link for understanding the history of slavery.

== World Heritage tentative list ==
On 12 June 2008, the site was included in the tentative list of world cultural heritage and is part of the Unesco Slave Route Project.

Since then, almost nothing has been done to highlight this vestige. This makes more than one visitor shocked by this state of abandonment.

Samuel Mabandza, departmental director of heritage in the Department of Kouilou, assures that "the Congolese state is not insensitive to this situation". He adds that "it is planned to build an African city of arts surrounded by museums in the open air, in order to enhance the old port of embarkation of slaves." "An action that will also benefit local communities", he confides, without providing more details as to the deadlines for carrying out the project.

== See also ==
- Slavery in Africa
- Atlantic slave trade
- Atlantic slave trade to Brazil
- Kingdom of Loango
- Vili people
- Afro-Argentine
