= Alkekongen =

Islet of Brækmoholmane, Svalbard, Norway

Coordinates: 77°03.9′N 22°31′E

Alkekongen is an islet in Brækmoholmane, part of Thousand Islands, an island group south of Edgeøya, Norway. Its name is derived from the fact that thousands of little auks breed among the boulders of the island.
