= Rullesteinøya =

Island in Svalbard, Norway

Coordinates: 76°58′N 21°56′E

Rullesteinøya (English: Boulder Island) is a small island between Langåra and Rugla in Tiholmane, part of Thousand Islands, an archipelago south of Edgeøya.
