= Berentine Island =

Island in Norway

Native name: Berentineøya
- Location within Svalbard

Geography
- Coordinates: 77.275623°N 21.654186°E

Administration
- Norway

Berentine Island (Norwegian: Berentineøya) is the southernmost island in Kong Ludvigøyane, part of Thousand Islands, an island group south of Edgeøya in Svalbard, Norway.
