= Spunset =

Islet

Coordinates: 76°58.8′N 21°56.5′E

Spunset (English: The Bung) is a small islet between Langåra and Bommen in Tiholmane, part of Thousand Islands, an archipelago south of Edgeøya.
