= Teisten =

Island in Svalbard, Norway

Coordinates: 77°09′N 22°55′E

Teisten (English: The Black Guillemot) is an islet in Menkeøyane, part of Thousand Islands, a Norwegian island group south of Edgeøya.
