= Sperra =

Islet

Coordinates: 76°59.1′N 21°56.5′E

Sperra (English: The Rafter) is a small islet south of Lurøya in Tiholmane, part of Thousand Islands, an archipelago south of Edgeøya.
