= Tareloppa =

Island in Svalbard, Norway

Coordinates: 77°05′N 22°35′E

Tareloppa is an islet 2 miles (3 km) northeast of Brækmoholmane, part of Thousand Islands, an archipelago south of Edgeøya.
