= Schneiderberget =

Mountain in Svalbard, Norway

Coordinates: 77.4476°N 22.8140°E

Schneiderberget is a mountain at Edgeøya, Svalbard. It is located at the eastern side of Tjuvfjorden, and southeast of Tjuvfjordlaguna. The mountain is named after Norwegian zoologist Hans Jakob Sparre Schneider.
