= Kvalpynten =

Headland

- Cape
- Coordinates: 77°26′33″N 20°52′26″E
- Location: Edgeøya, Svalbard, Norway

Kvalpynten (Whale Point) is a headland at Edgeøya, Svalbard. It is the most southwestern point of Edgeøya. The headland contains the mountain Kvalpyntfjellet, and the summit of the glacier Kvalpyntfonna further east is the highest point on Edgeøya. The bay Tjuvfjorden is located between Kvalpynten and Svarthuken further southeast.
