= Gassen =

Island in Svalbard, Norway

Coordinates: 77°09′N 22°45′E

Gassen (English: The Gander) is the westernmost of the large islets in Menkeøyane, part of Thousand Islands, a Norwegian archipelago south of Edgeøya.
