= Meinickeøyane =

Island group in Svalbard, Norway

Coordinates: 77°10′N 21°30′E

Meinickeøyane (Svalbard)

Meinickeøyane (English: Meinicke Islands) is an island group composed of two islets, Store Meinickeøya and Vesle Meinickeøya, that form part of Thousand Islands, an island group south of Edgeøya, part of the Svalbard archipelago. They were named after the German geographer Carl Eduard Meinicke (1803–76).
