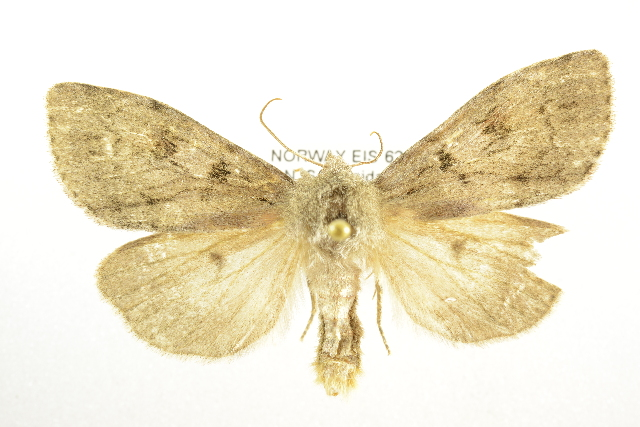

Scientific classification
- Kingdom: Animalia
- Phylum: Arthropoda
- Class: Insecta
- Order: Lepidoptera
- Superfamily: Noctuoidea
- Family: Noctuidae
- Genus: Xestia
- Species: X. gelida

Binomial name
- Xestia gelida (Sparre Schneider, 1883)

Synonyms
- Agrotis gelida Sparre Schneider, 1883

= Xestia gelida =

Species of moth

Xestia gelida is a species of moth belonging to the family Noctuidae, found in Fennoscandia and northern Russia. It was first collected by Jacob Sparre Schneider on an expedition in Sør-Varanger Municipality in Finnmark county, Norway in 1882, and was described the following year. This was the only specimen known in Norway until 2010, when it was rediscovered in Nord-Trøndelag county.

The larvae are known to feed on Vaccinium myrtillus (European blueberry) and Taraxacum (dandelion). The adults are active from June to July.

The species is considered endangered in the 2015 Norwegian Red List and vulnerable in the 2020 Swedish Red List, primarily due to habitat loss.

In 1989, it was found to exhibit industrial melanism, possibly the first known case among subarctic fauna.
