= Hornøya (Svalbard) =

Island in Svalbard, Norway

Coordinates: 77°00.5′N 21°52.5′E

Hornøya (English: Horn Island) is the northernmost island in Tribotnane, part of Thousand Islands, an archipelago south of Edgeøya. Its name refers to the neighboring Lurøya.
