= Langara =

Langara may refer to:

== Places ==
=== British Columbia, Canada ===
- Langara Island, the northernmost island of Haida Gwaii
  - Langara Light, lighthouse on Langara Island
- Vancouver-Langara, provincial legislative constituency (electoral district) in Vancouver

=== Norway ===
- Langåra, an island of Tiholmane, part of the Thousand Islands

== People ==
- Isidro Lángara (1912—1992), Spanish football striker
- Juan de Lángara (1736—1806), Spanish naval officer

== Arts ==
- Langara (Stargate), race and planet in the fictional Stargate SG-1 universe

== Education ==
- Langara College, a four-year community college in Vancouver, Canada
