= Diskobukta =

Bay of Svalbard

Coordinates: 77.93°N 21.46°E

Diskobukta is a bay at the western side of Edgeøya, Svalbard, at the eastern side of Storfjorden, Norway. The bay is a suitable anchoring site for vessels.
