= Bölscheøya =

Island of Svalbard, Norway

Coordinates: 77°10′N 22°00′E

Bölscheøya (Svalbard)

Bölscheøya (English: Bölsche Island) is an island southwest of Svarthuken, the southeastern point of Edgeøya, Norway. It is part of Thousand Islands. The island was named in 1868 by the German geographer August Petermann (1822–78) after the German journalist Carl Bölsche, father of the German writer and zoologist Wilhelm Bölsche (1843–93). The remains of a whaling station (probably Dutch) from the 17th century can be found on the island.
