= Hornøya =

Hornøya may refer to:

- Hornøya (Finnmark), an island off the coast of mainline Norway; the easternmost point of Norway
- Hornøya (Svalbard), one of a group of small islands south of the island of Edgeøya, Norway
