= Kong Ludvigøyane =

Island group in Svalbard, Norway

Coordinates: 77°10′N 21°00′E

Kong Ludvigøyane (Svalbard)

Kong Ludvigøyane (English: King Ludwig Islands) is a small group of islands south of southwestern Edgeøya. The group includes Russebuholmane, Arendtsøya, Berentine Island, and Bruhnsøya. They form part of Thousand Islands. They are named after King Ludwig II (1845–86) of Bavaria, Germany. The islands may be the Hopeless Iles of the Muscovy Company's map (1625).
