= Menkeøyane =

Island in Svalbard, Norway

Coordinates: 77°10′N 23°00′E

Menkeøyane (Svalbard)

Menkeøyane (English: Menke Islands) is a small Norwegian island group south of Halvmåneøya, an island off the southeast coast of Edgeøya. The group includes Havella, Alka, Gassen, Teisten, Islomen and Blåmåken. They comprise part of Thousand Islands. The islands are named after the German cartographer and historical geographer Heinrich Theodor Menke (1819–92). The islands appear on the Muscovy Company's map (1625), one of which is labeled Heling I.
