= Burleigh House, Enfield =

Coordinates: 51.653°N 0.083°W

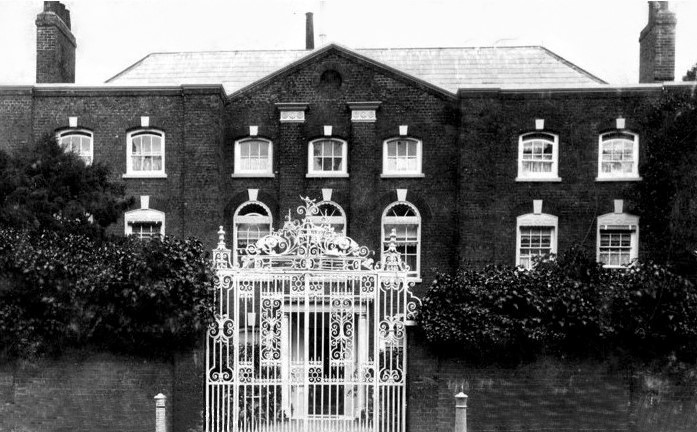
Burleigh House

Burleigh House was a house in Enfield, near London, that was built in the mid-17th century for the lawyer James Mayoe. It was constructed on the grounds of a house once owned by the merchant Benjamin Deicrowe Jr. that Mayoe obtained from the indebted Deicrowe through legal manoeuvring. Burleigh House, which did not receive that name until the 19th-century, was particularly known for its ornate iron gates. It was demolished in 1913 and shops and a cinema built on its grounds but is remembered in the modern Burleigh Way.

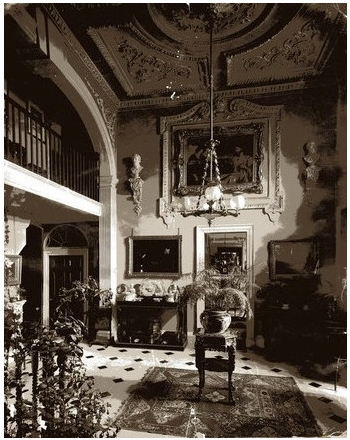
Burleigh House interior

== History ==
Burleigh House was built in Church Street, west of Enfield Marketplace, in the mid-17th century for the lawyer James Mayoe, who erected it on the site of a larger house once owned by the merchant Benjamin Deicrowe Jr., which, through connivance and legal manoeuvring, Mayoe had obtained from the indebted Deicrowe.

James Mayoe passed the house to Clement Mayoe, who left it to his friend Robert Fish, who owned it in 1697. The house was named Burleigh House by the stockbroker Joseph Withers who was tenant there with his family from 1865. Joseph died in 1888 but his wife Emma continued to live at the house until her death in 1907.

The house was said to have a ghost dressed in doublet, hose and ruffle.

== Architecture ==
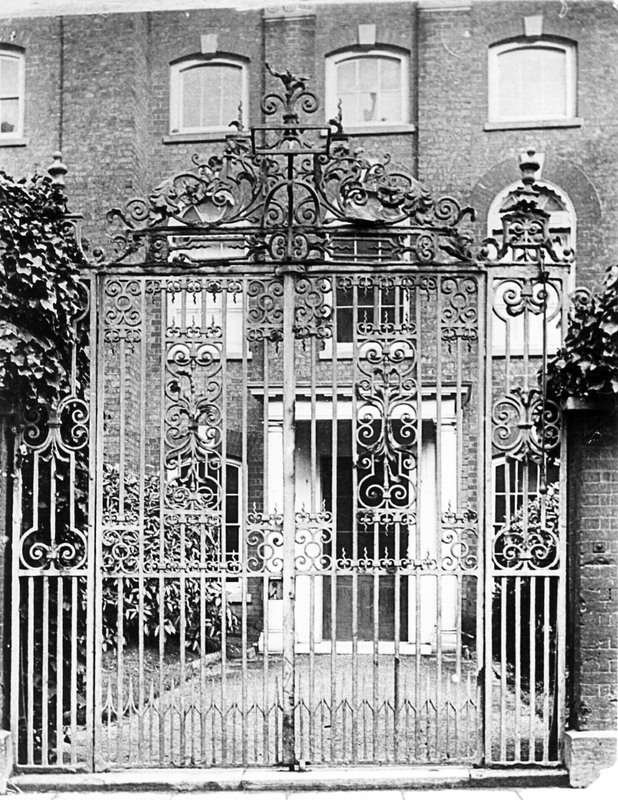
Burleigh House gates

The central part of the house, and probably the oldest, was ornamented by brick pilasters. The entrance hall was of Purbeck stone with a fireplace decorated with Flemish tiles. In the early 1900s, the kitchen still had a roasting spit that was thought to be 200 years old and a deep well that still provided water. The drawing room was on the first floor with three round-headed windows and a chimney-piece in white marble showing Alexander the Great. Above the drawing room were the bedrooms. One room contained a fireplace with the initials BDM for Benjamin and Margaret Deicrowe. A noted feature of the house was its iron gates, believed to have been made by the blacksmith Thomas Warren (1673-1736).

== Demolition and legacy ==
The house was demolished in 1913 with the fixtures and fittings sold at auction and the site sold for £7,000. Shops were built on the frontage by 1914 and the Rialto Cinema built on the bulk of the site in 1920. The cinema was renamed the Granada in 1967 and closed in 1971. The building then became a bingo hall before it was replaced by housing.

The house is remembered in Burleigh Way, north of Church Street and to the west of the marketplace. Sale catalogues and correspondence relating to the sale of the house are held by the London Metropolitan Archives.

== See also ==
- William Cecil, 1st Baron Burghley
