= Havella =

Island in Svalbard, Norway

Coordinates: 77°05′N 22°40′E

Havella (English: The Long-tailed Duck) is the largest islet in Menkeøyane, part of Thousand Islands, a Norwegian archipelago south of Edgeøya. It is named after the long-tailed duck (Clangula hyemalis), a migrant to Svalbard.
