= Dyrdalen =

Valley of Svalbard, Norway

Coordinates: 77.7220°N 22.7103°E

Dyrdalen (The Reindeer Valley) is a valley at Edgeøya, Svalbard. It is the largest valley on the island, with a length of about twenty kilometers, and runs northwards from the head of Tjuvfjorden, west of Edgeøyjøkulen.
