= Ryke Yseøyane =

Group of islands in Svalbard, Norway

Coordinates: 77°40′N 25°00′E

Ryke Yseøyane is a group of several small islands off the east coast of the island of Edgeøya in Svalbard, Norway. The islands are named after the Dutch whaler Ryke Yse of Vlieland, who discovered them about 1640–1645. The group was first marked by Hendrick Doncker, of Amsterdam, in 1663. Two Norwegian polar bear hunters wintered on Ryke Yseøyane for two subsequent winters in 1967–1969. During the second winter, one of them was lost in drifting ice. They are part of the Southeast Svalbard Nature Reserve.
