= Schareholmane =

Island in Svalbard, Norway

Coordinates: 76°59.6′N 22°14.5′E

Schareholmane (Svalbard)

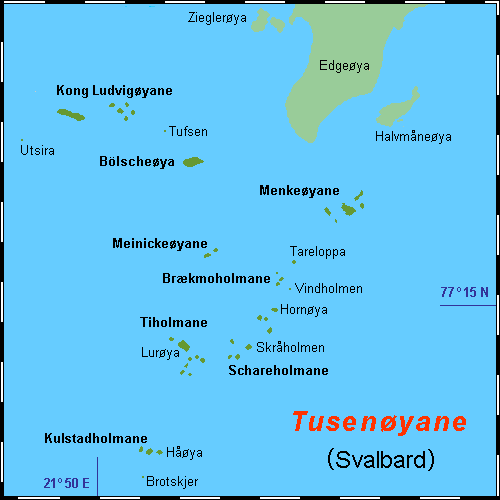

Schareholmane (English: Schare Islands or Schare Islets) is a group of three larger and a few smaller islets east of Tiholmane, part of Thousand Islands, an archipelago south of Edgeøya. The group includes Blokkøya, Kvalbeinøya and Havmerra. The islets are named after Christian Schare, who, along with four others, was forced to overwinter here after they had lost their ship on September 3, 1833. All but one (who had died) were saved on June 22, 1834.
