= Kikutodden =

Headland in Spitsbergen, Svalbard

Coordinates: 76.6013°N 16.9688°E

Kikutodden is a headland in Sørkapp Land at Spitsbergen, Svalbard. It is located between the coves Grunnvågen and Austerbogen and has a length of about 400 meters.

The headland marks the southwestern point of Storfjorden.
