= Jacob Sparre Schneider =

Norwegian zoologist and entomologist

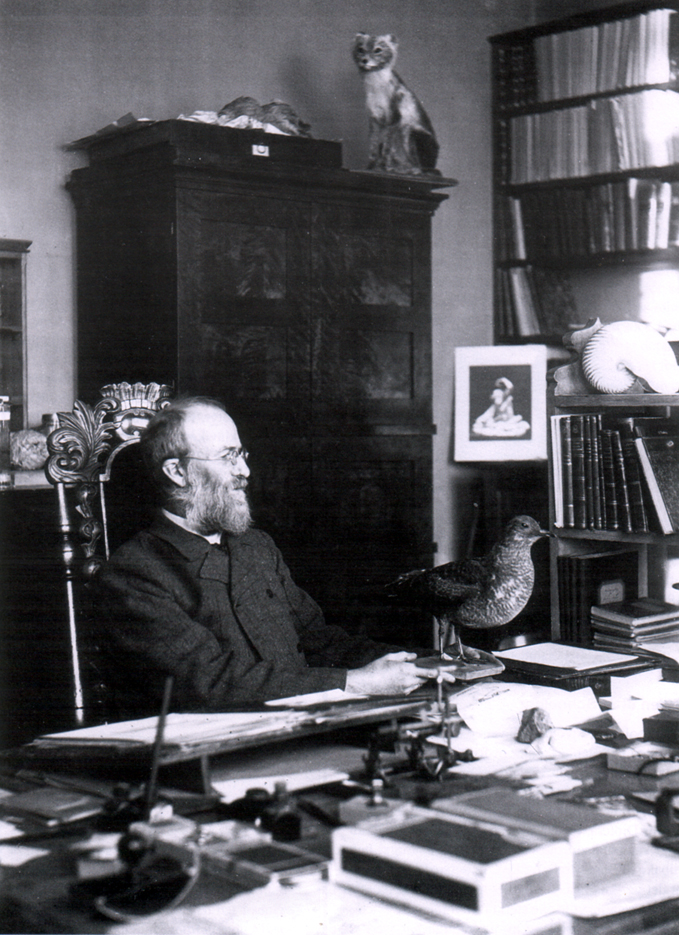
- Born: 11 February 1853; Åsnes, Norway
- Died: 27 July 1918 (aged 65)
- Occupations: zoologist and entomologist
- Awards: Order of St. Olav

Hans Jacob Sparre Schneider (11 February 1853 – 27 July 1918) was a Norwegian zoologist and entomologist. He is most associated with his contribution to knowledge about the zoology in Northern Norway, in particular the insect fauna.

Schneider was born at Åsnes in Hedmark, Norway. He was the son of Andreas Schneider (1818-1861) and Marie Lovise Jørgine Sparre (1824-1902). He grew up in the traditional region of Solør. After his father's death, he and a sister lived with their grandfather in Bergen. He attended Bergen Cathedral School and took school graduation 1871. He began studying medicine at the University of Christiania, but left in 1873 to study zoology, botany and geology. In 1874, he received a grant to explore insect life in Bergenhus amt (now Hordaland), and from 1876 in Nedenes and Modum.

He was the first conservator at Tromsø Museum, and held this position for 41 years until his death. He was a member of the Royal Norwegian Society of Sciences and Letters and the Entomological Society in Stockholm as well as entomological societies in Leiden and Frankfurt. He was decorated Knight, First Class of the Order of St. Olav in 1904. The mountain Schneiderberget on the island of Edgeøya in the Svalbard archipelago is named after him.
