= Keilhaubreen =

Glacier in Svalbard, Norway

Coordinates: 76.6541°N 16.9457°E

Keilhaubreen is a glacier in Sørkapp Land at Spitsbergen, Svalbard. It has a length of about five kilometers and is located north of Keilhaufjellet, flowing from Sørkappfonna towards the eastern coast of Spitsbergen. The glacier is named after Norwegian geologist Baltazar Mathias Keilhau. To the south of the glacier is the bay Austerbogen.
