= Utsira (Svalbard) =

Islet in the Thousand Islands

- Location within Svalbard

Geography
- Coordinates: 77°09′N 21°28′E

Administration
- Norway

Utsira is a small islet in the western part of Thousand Islands, an island group south of Edgeøya. It is named after an island in Norway.
