= Austerbogen =

Bay in Svalbard, Norway

Coordinates: 76.6196°N 16.9781°E

Austerbogen (Eastern Bay) is a bay in Sørkapp Land at Spitsbergen, Svalbard. It is located between the headland of Kikutodden and Keilhaubreen at the eastern coast of Spitsbergen.
