= Peter Schenk the Younger =

German engraver and map publisher (1693–1775)

- Born: 15 February 1693; Amsterdam
- Died: 14 January 1775 (aged 81)
- Known for: engraver and cartographer

Peter Schenk the Younger (born 15 February 1693 in Amsterdam; died: 14 January 1775) was a Dutch engraver and map publisher active in Leipzig.

He was the son of the engraver and map publisher Peter Schenk the Elder who owned a shop in Leipzig and travelled regularly between there and Amsterdam in the 17th century. In 1715 Peter the Younger traveled to Leipzig in order to sell some paintings by Jan van Huchtenburgh and Jan and Willem van Mieris.

== Career ==
Schenk the Younger continued the family publishing business in Leipzig, building on the work of his father and Gerard Valck. He helped produce and reissue maps using existing printing plates, many of which had been updated or revised. Some of these maps formed part of the Atlas Contractus (also known as the Atlas Minor), which remained in circulation into the 18th century.
