= Rugla =

Island

Coordinates: 76°57′N 21°54′E

Rugla is the southernmost island of Tiholmane, part of Thousand Islands, an island group south of Edgeøya.
