= Zieglerøya =

Remote island at the southern side of Edgeøya, Svalbard

Zieglerøya is a remote island off the headland Andréetangen at the eastern side of Tjuvfjorden, at the southern side of Edgeøya, Svalbard. Total area of the island is approximately 2,8 km^{2}. The island is possibly named after either German Arctic explorer Phil. Alex. Ziegler, or Swiss cartographer Jakob Melchior Ziegler. It is quite low lying, with an elevation of1 metre (3 feet). It is also known as Ziegler Island.

== Location ==
Latitude - 77.3906° or 77° 23' 26" north

Longitude - 22.4109° or 22° 24' 39.2" east

== History ==
This island was named after New York businessman William Ziegler, leader of the 1901 Baldwin-Ziegler North Pole Expedition, on ships America, Fridtjof and Belgica, and of the 1903–1905 Ziegler-Fiala Polar Expedition. The Austrian observing site Payer–Weyprecht (81°06′N 56°11′E) was established around the start of the 20th century on this island.
