= Benjamin Deicrowe =

English merchant (c.1560s - c.1646)

Benjamin Deicrowe, or Deicrow, Decrowe, or Decrow (c.1560s - c.1646) was an English merchant and warden of the Muscovy Company in 1617 and 1627. He was a freeman of the Merchant Adventurers, the Russia and the East India Companies. He gave his name to Deicrowe's Sound, a fjord in Svalbard (Spitsbergen), Norway, now known as Tjuvfjorden.

== Early life ==
Deicrowe was born around 1560. He was apprenticed to Anthony Marlour.

== Career ==
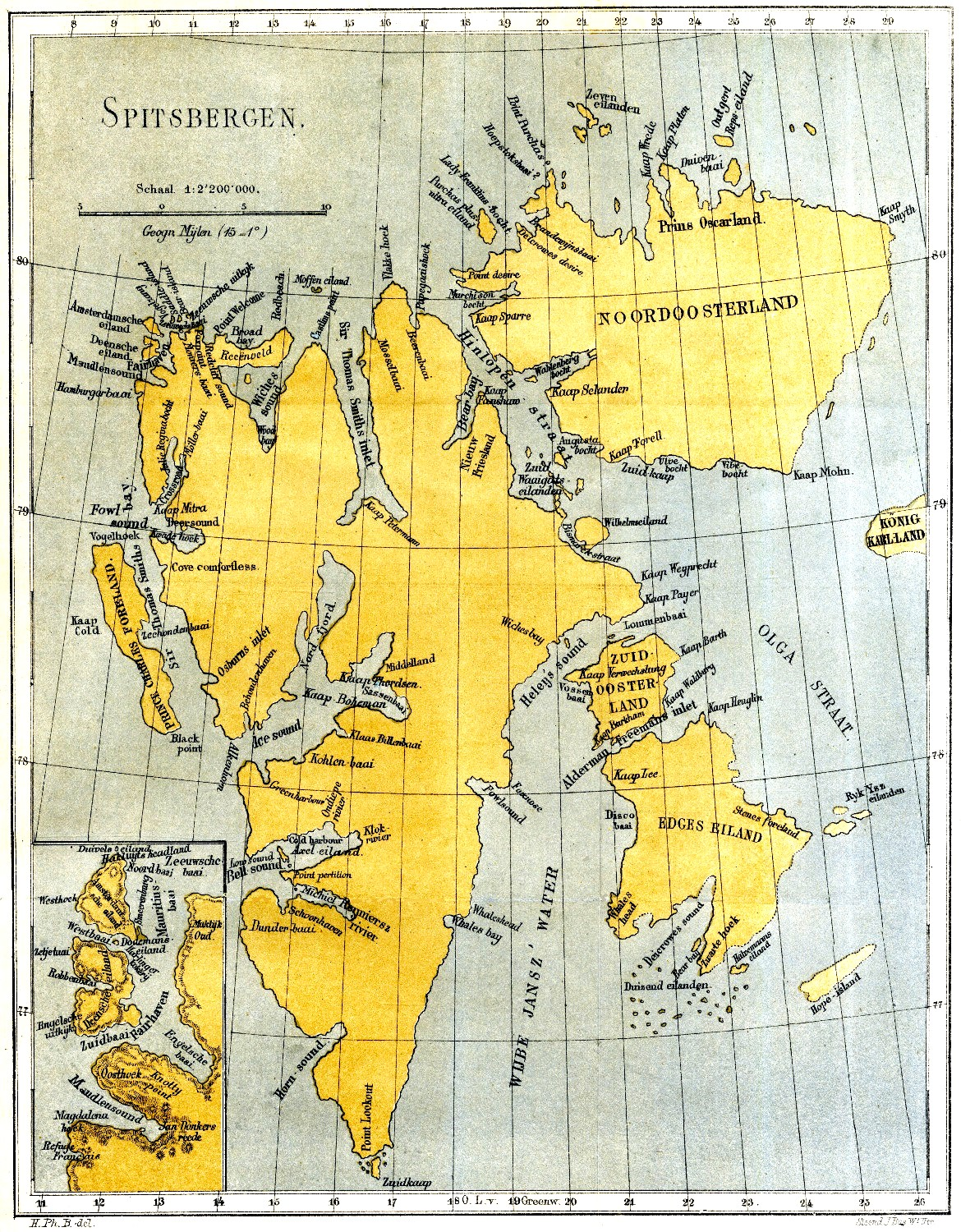
Map of Spitsbergen c. 1873 showing Deicrowe's Sound lower right

Deicrowe was freed from his apprenticeship by 1588.

He gave his name in 1616 to Deicrowe's Sound, a fjord in Svalbard, Norway, now known as Tjuvfjorden.

He was warden of the Muscovy Company in 1617 and 1627 and was a freeman of the Merchant Adventurers, the Russia and the East India Companies.

He owned property in London, Middlesex and Surrey.

== Family ==
He married and had sons Benjamin, Robert and Valentine.

== Death ==
He made his will in 1626 and amended it in 1632. He probably died in 1646 as probate was granted in December 1646.
