= Edgeøyjøkulen =

Glacier in Svalbard, Norway

Coordinates: 77°44′49″N 22°32′32″E

Edgeøyjøkulen is an ice cap glacier on Edgeøya, part of the Svalbard archipelago, Norway. The glacier covers an area of about 1,365 km^{2} (527 sq mi).
