= Karl Spruner von Merz =

German cartographer and scholar

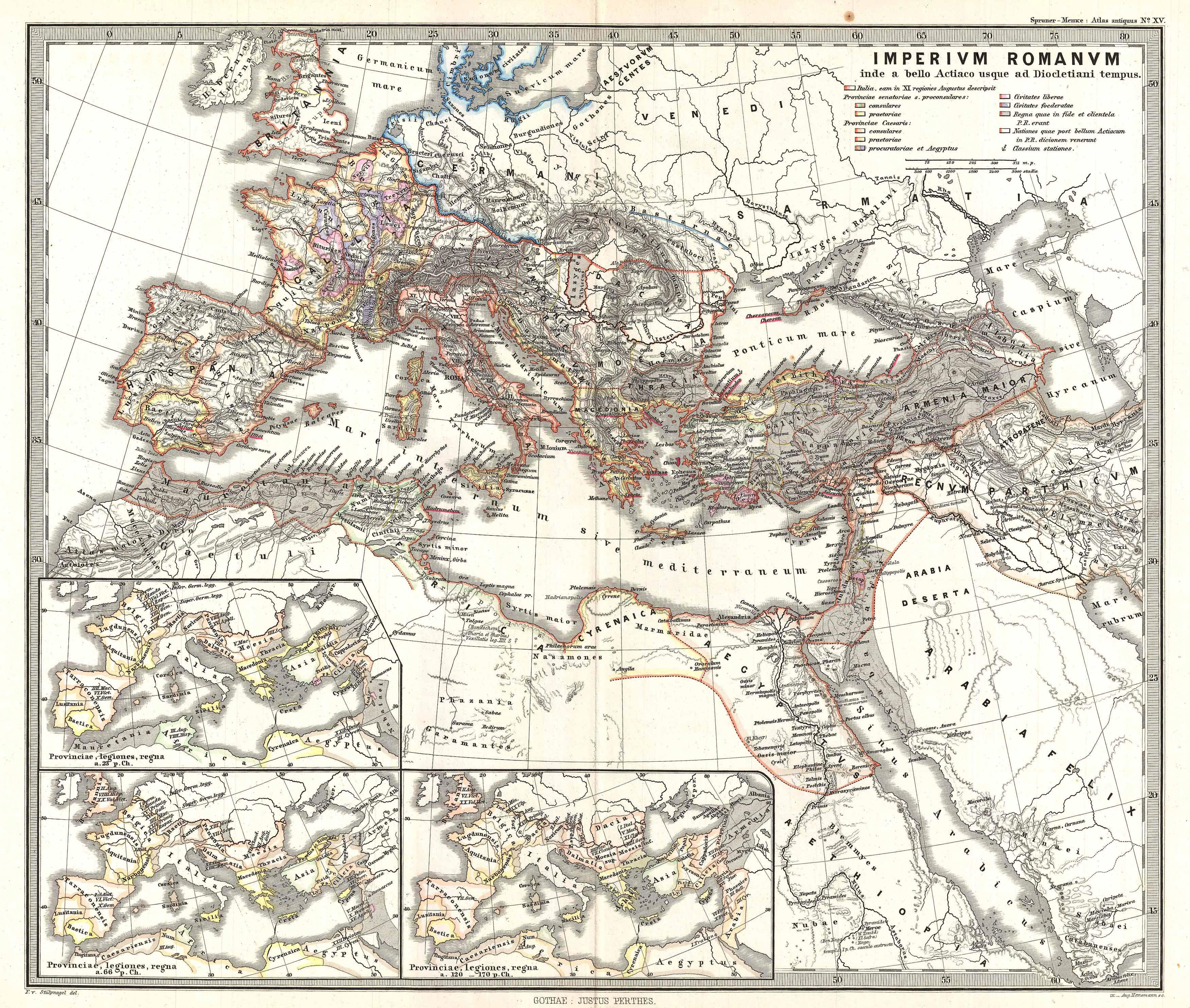
1865 Spruner map of the Roman Empire under Diocletian

Karl Spruner von Merz (15 November 1803, in Stuttgart – 24 August 1892), or Karl von Spruner as he preferred to be known, was a German cartographer and scholar.

He spent most of his long life in military service. He joined the Bavarian army, aged 11, in 1814, and was promoted to lieutenant in 1825. He established a reputation as a scholar, but this did not come to the notice of his military superiors until 1851, leading them to promote him to major in 1852 and to lieutenant colonel in 1855. He was promoted to general in 1883, and finally retired in 1886, after 72 years in the Bavarian army.

Spruner von Merz is best known for his historical atlases. The first of these was his Historischer Atlas von Bayern (historical atlas of Bavaria), published in 1838. His greatest work was his Historisch-Geographischer Hand-Atlas, whose first edition appeared in parts from 1848 to 1853. Heinrich Theodor Menke made major contributions to its second and third editions.

In 1842, he was made a member of the Bavarian Academy of Sciences and Humanities.
