= Svarthuken =

Headland in Svalbard, Norway

- Cape
- Coordinates: 77°14′30″N 22°39′38″E
- Location: Edgeøya, Svalbard, Norway

Svarthuken is a headland at Edgeøya, Svalbard. It is the southernmost point of Edgeøya, and has a length of about two kilometers. The rock consists of dark shales, and reaches 326 m.a.s.l. The bay Tjuvfjorden is located between Svarthuken and Kvalpynten further northwest. To the east is the strait Halvmånesundet.

== Name history ==
The headland was named Negro Point by English sailors in the 17th century and was the official name from 1871. It was changed to the more Norwegian sounding Negerpynten in 1933. After complaints about racism the name was changed to Svarthuken in 2023.
