= Lurøya (Svalbard) =

Island

Coordinates: 77°00′N 21°55′E

Lurøya is the largest island in Tiholmane, part of Thousand Islands, an island group south of Edgeøya. It is part of the Norwegian territory of Svalbard.
