= Håøya (Svalbard) =

Islet in Kulstadholmane, Svalbard, Norway

Coordinates: 76°50′N 21°00′E

Håøya (English: High Island) is the main islet in Kulstadholmane, part of Thousand Islands, an island group south of Edgeøya, part of the Svalbard archipelago.
