= Heinrich Theodor Menke =

German geographer (1819–1892)

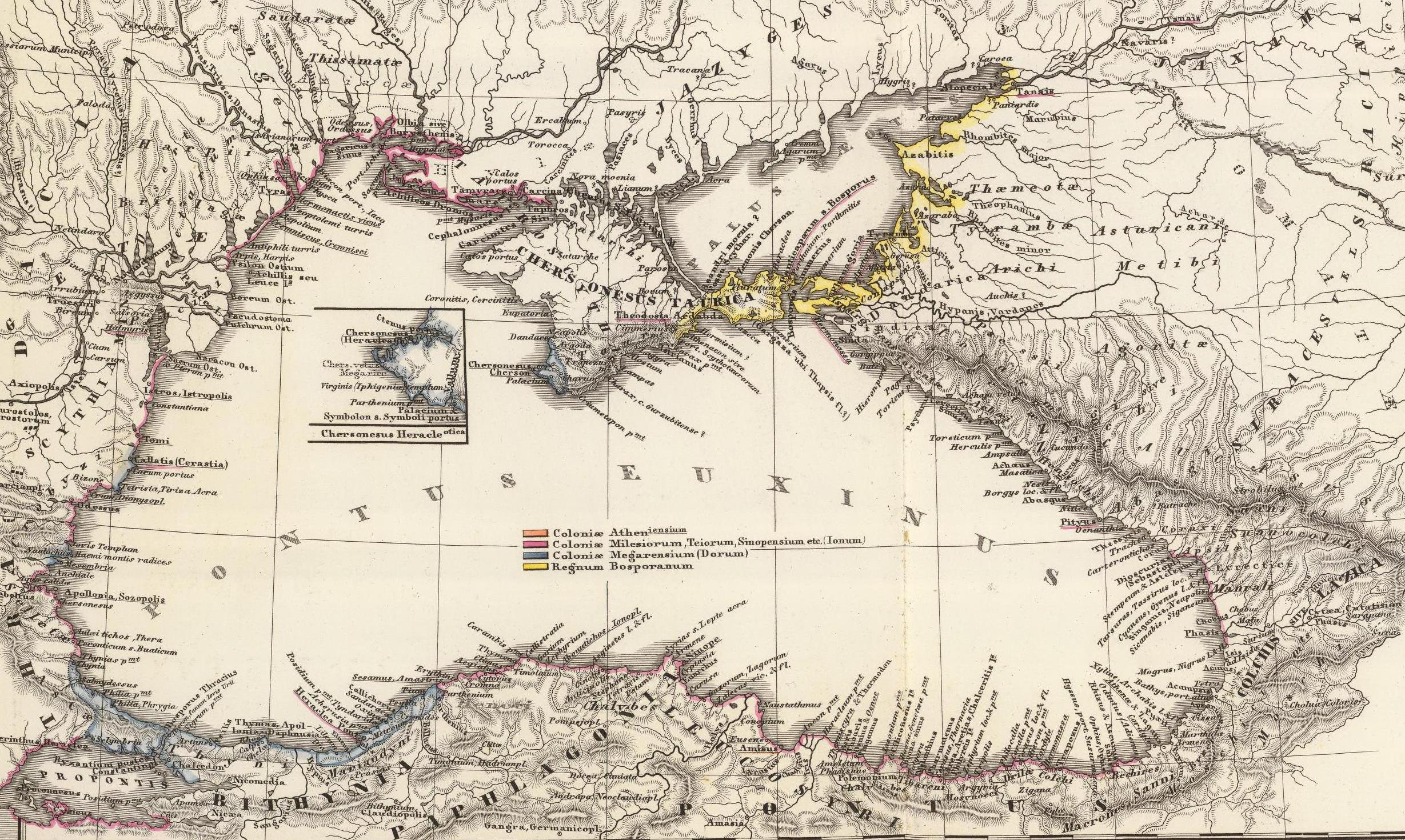
Spruner-Menke atlas antiquus, Pontus Euxinus et quae ei adjacent (1865).

Heinrich Theodor Menke (24 May 1819 – 14 May 1892) was a German geographer, who was born and lived in Bremen. He is remembered for his work in historical geography.

== Education and career ==
Menke studied theology and philology at the University of Bonn, and in 1842 received his doctorate at Halle with a dissertation on ancient Lydia. Afterwards, he worked as a school teacher in Bremen, but soon became dis-satisfied with this line of work, and undertook legal studies in Berlin and Heidelberg. After attaining his degree, he practiced law in Bremen, and later Vegesack.

Throughout his life, Menke had an avid interest in geography, and via contact with Wilhelm Perthes (1783–1853) of the Justus Perthes Geographische Anstalt in Gotha, in the centre of Germany, his primary vocational focus turned to editing and producing geographical atlases. In 1865, he published the third edition of Karl Spruner von Merz' Atlas Antiquus, and later produced the heavily revised third edition of Spruner's atlas of medieval and modern history, Hand-Atlas für die Geschichte des Mittelalters und der neueren Zeit (1871–1880). Menke, a corresponding member of the Bavarian Academy of Sciences and Humanities since 1877, died in Gotha on 14 May 1892.

The island group Menkeøyane in the Svalbard archipelago is named in his honour.
