= Henry Rudi =

Norwegian hunter (1889–1970)

- Born: Henry Marentius Rudi; March 12, 1889; Tromsø, Norway
- Died: June 15, 1970 (aged 81); Tromsø, Norway
- Other name: Isbjørnkongen (The Polar Bear King)
- Occupations: Trapper, polar bear hunter
- Years active: 1908–1947
- Known for: Polar bear hunting

Henry Marentius Rudi (12 March 1889 – 15 June 1970) was a Norwegian trapper and polar bear hunter.

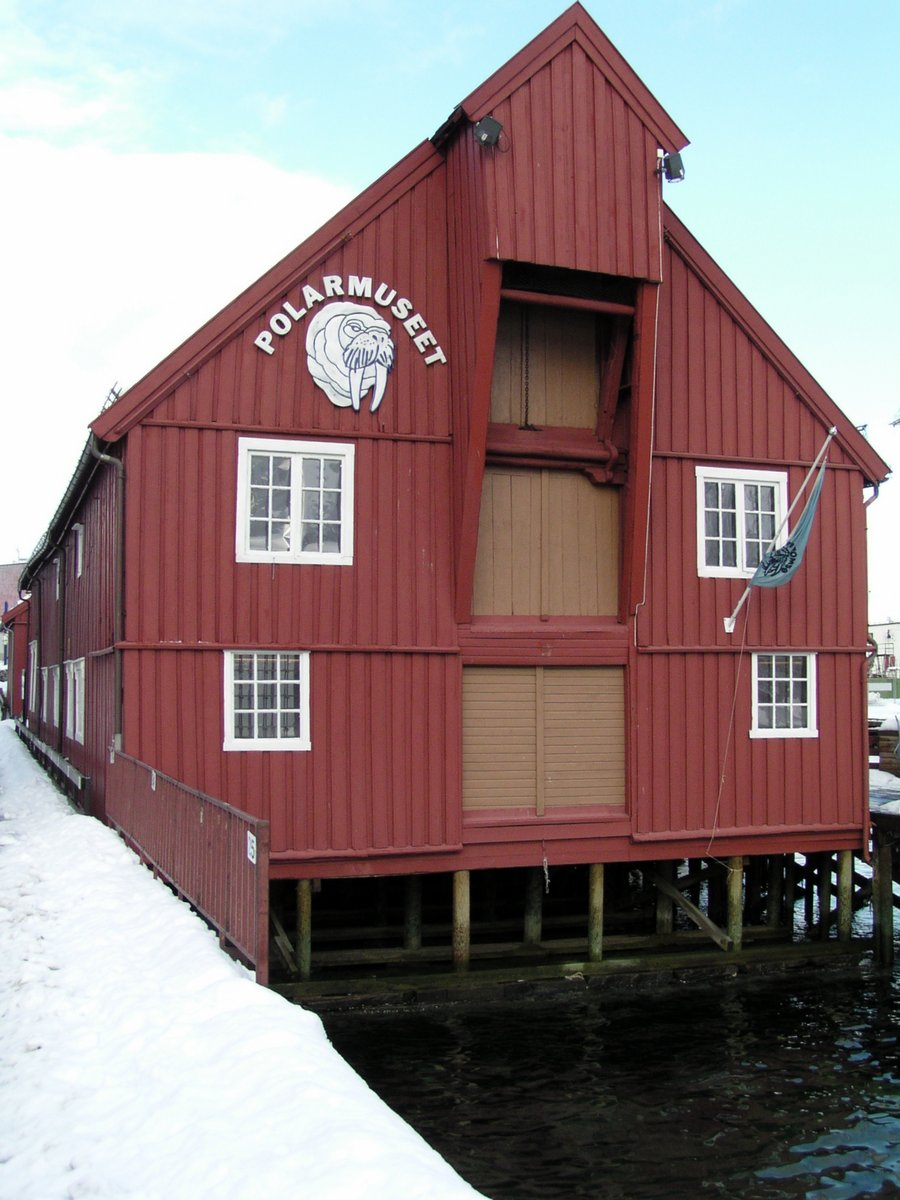
Polar Museum at Tromsø has a permanent exhibition relating to Henry Rudi

Rudi was born in Tromsø, Norway, the son of Ole Olsen Rudi (1859–1935) and Marie Wilhelmine Henriksen (1863–1934). His father had originally moved from Gudbrandsdalen.

He started his career as a shopkeeper in Tromsø, but life behind the counter became monotonous. At 19, he spent the winter at Hopen in Svalbard (1908–09). He later went to the island of Jan Mayen and various fishing grounds in Svalbard. He also spent several winters in Greenland, first in Northeast Greenland (1928–30), at Southeast Greenland (1931–33) and at Northeast Greenland again (1939–42). During World War II, he belonged to a sled patrol under Danish command that patrolled the Greenland coastlines on the lookout for German soldiers (1942–45).

In total, he went on 40 hunting trips to the Arctic regions, and wintered there for 25 of them. The animals that were usually hunted in these regions included Arctic fox, walrus and seal, but Rudi is best known for having killed a total of 713 polar bears. The winter of 1947 was his last time hunting in the Arctic.

Rudi spent his last days in the town of Tromsø. He was known for his cheerful personality and spent a lot of his retirement days in the Ølhallen pub in Tromsø, where he gladly spoke to everybody who would listen about his adventures in the Arctic. In 1953, he was awarded with the King's Medal of Merit (Kongens fortjenstmedalje). He has also been honored with his own permanent exhibition in the Polar Museum (Polarmuseet) at Tromsø alongside other Arctic explorers, including Roald Amundsen and Fridtjof Nansen.

== Other sources ==
- Sørensen, Lars Normann (1958) Henry Rudi, Isbjørnkongen Oslo: Gyldendal) ISBN 9788205297975
