= Peter Schenk the Elder =

German engraver and cartographer (1660–1711)

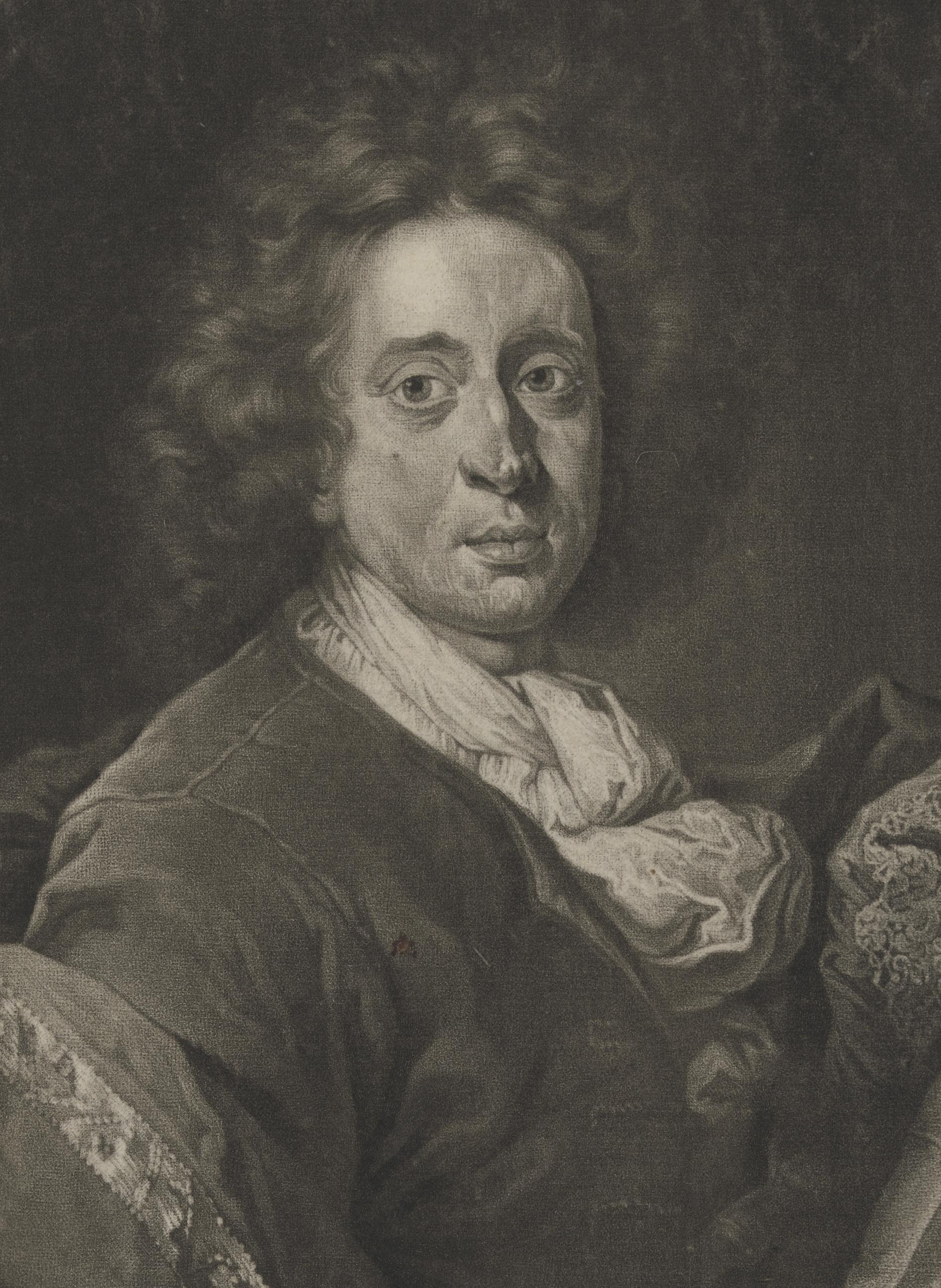
- Born: 26 December 1660; Elberfeld
- Died: 1711 (aged 50–51); Leipzig
- Education: Gerard Valck
- Occupations: Engraver; cartographer

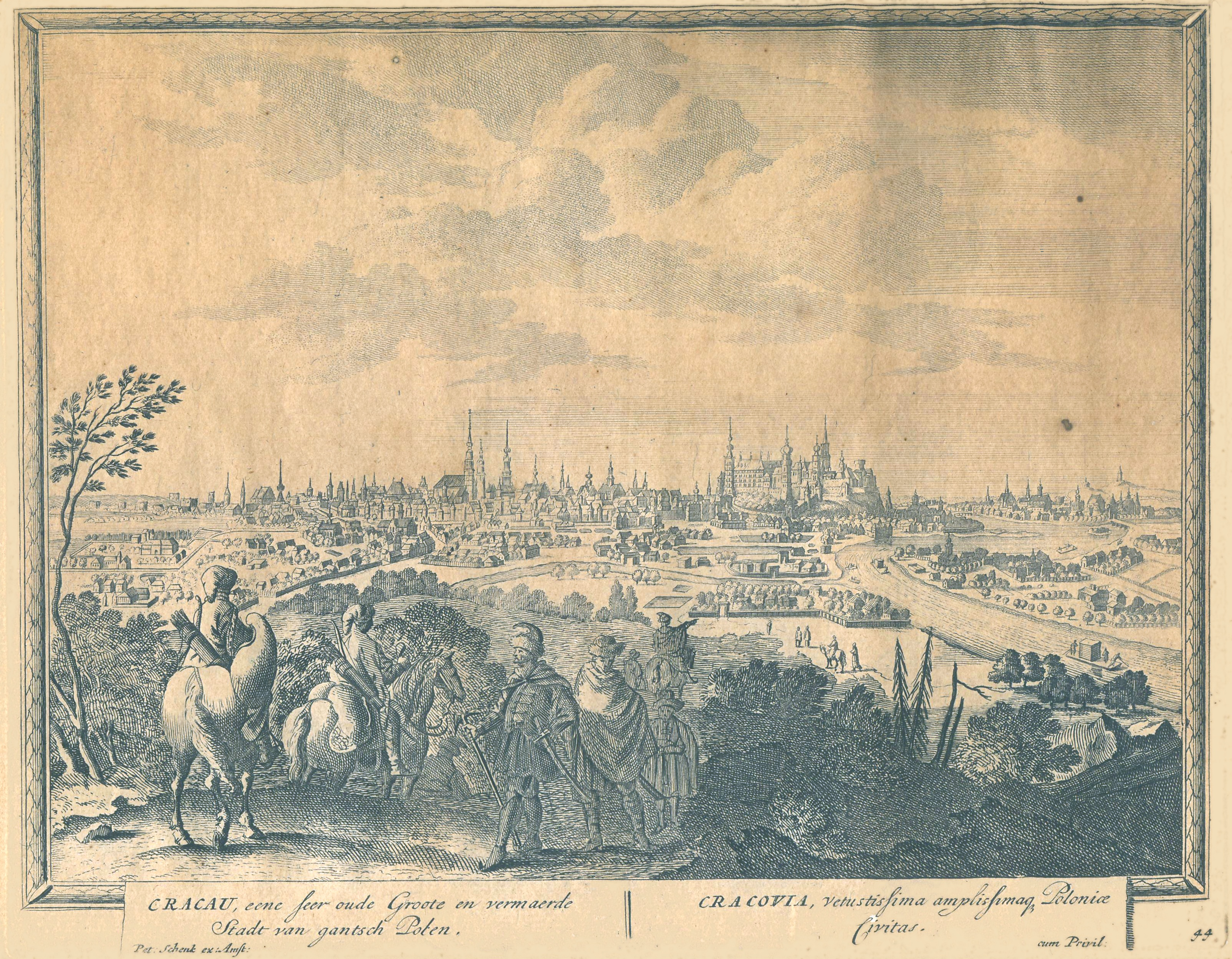
Kraków, copper engraving by Peter Schenk

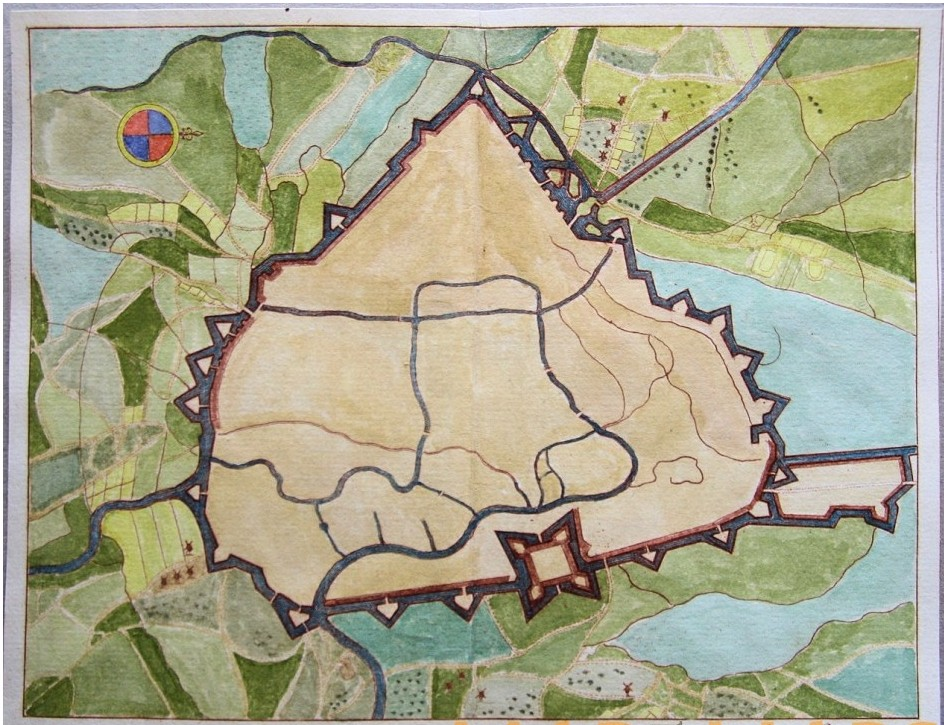
Ghent in 1702 by Schenck

Petrus Schenck, or Pieter, or Peter Schenk the Elder (baptized: 26 December 1660 – between 12 August and 17 November 1711) was a German engraver and cartographer active in Amsterdam and Leipzig.

== Biography ==
=== Early life and family ===
Peter Schenk the Elder was born in 1660 in Elberfeld, in the Duchy of Berg, now part of Germany. Little is known about his early childhood.

In 1675, at about age 15, he moved to Amsterdam in the Dutch Republic, one of Europe’s leading centres of printmaking and cartography. There he trained under the engraver and publisher Gerard Valck, specializing in mezzotint.

At about age 27, in 1687, Schenk married Agatha Valck, the sister of Gerard Valck. They had several children, including three sons, Peter Schenk the Younger, Jan Schenk, and Leonard Schenk. His eldest son, Peter Schenk the Younger, later continued his father’s shop in Leipzig. His daughter, Maria Schenk, married Leonard Valck, the son of Gerard Valck.

=== Career ===
In 1694, together with Valck, he bought some of the copperplates of the artdealer and cartographer Johannes Janssonius. Along with Valck and Bloteling, he produced prints for the London market, though it is not known if he ever went there with them.

Until 1700, he lived in the Jordaan, then he moved to Dam Square or to Leipzig, where he opened a shop, selling maps and art.

=== Death ===
He was a regular visitor to the trade fair Leipziger Messe in Leipzig, where he died.

== Works ==
- Schenk drew several Amsterdam burgomasters: Coenraad van Beuningen, Johannes Hudde and Nicolaas Witsen.
- He owned an Album Amicorum that was signed was several famous people and runs from 1700 until 1713. Schenk was appointed as court artist in Dresden. He published numerous maps and a drawing of Saxonia.
- Continentis Italiae Pars Australior: Sive Regnum Neapolitanum; Hispaniae Obediens: Subdivisum In suos Districtus, Terras, Atque Principatus, Quibus adjectae Sicilia, In Valles tripartita et Contra Turcas ejus Propugnaculum Malta Insula - Amsterdam, ca. 1703. digitized by the Universitäts- und Landesbibliothek Düsseldorf
- Works by or about Peter Schenk in the catalog of the Deutschen Nationalbibliothek
