= Brækmoholmane =

Island group in Svalbard, Norway

Coordinates: 77°04′N 22°30′E

Brækmoholmane (Svalbard)

Brækmoholmane (English: Brækmo Islands) is an island group composed of three islands, Store Brækmoholmen, Trønderen and Alkekongen. They form part of Thousand Islands, an archipelago south of Edgeøya. The islands are named after the Norwegian sailor and fisherman Sivert Brækmo (1853-1930), who visited Svalbard regularly between 1876 and 1895.
