= Tiholmane =

Island group in Svalbard, Norway

Coordinates: 76°59′N 21°58′E

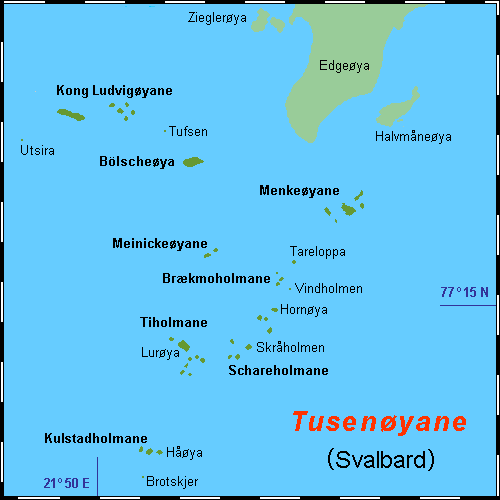
Map showing the Tiholmane island

Tiholmane ("Ten Islands" or "Ten Islets") is a group of ten small islands that form part of Thousand Islands, an archipelago south of Edgeøya in Svalbard. The largest of the islands are Lurøya, Kalvøya, Langåra and Rugla. The group also includes the smaller Sperra, Spunset, Bommen, Proppen, Rullesteinøya and Røysholmen.
