= Halvmåneøya =

Island in Svalbard, Norway

Coordinates: 77°10′N 23°00′E

Halvmåneøya (English: Crescent Island) is a small, uninhabited Norwegian island off the southeastern coast of Edgeøya, part of the Svalbard archipelago. Halvmåneøya, as part of Edgeøya, has been a nature preserve since 1973, and visitation is strictly regulated.

The island was labelled as Abbots I. by the Muscovy Company's map (1625), and St. Jacob by Willem Jansz. Blaeu (1662). Hendrick Doncker (1663) was the first to mark it Halvmaens eyl.. This last name has been retained to the present. The modern Norwegian name, Halvmåneøya, is a direct translation of the old name, meaning Half Moon Island. Halvmåneøya is 12 square kilometres (4.6 sq mi) large and consists entirely of dolerite rock. In 2010, traffic has been banned on most of the island, except a small area around Bjørneborg, a hunting station originally built in 1904. Bjørneborg has been enlarged and repaired later.

Four Russian sailors, Aleksei Inkov, Khrisanf Inkov, Stepan Sharapov, and Fedor Verigin, were marooned on either Halvmåneøya or Edgeøya for over six years from May 1743 until September 1749. Three of them survived. Author David Roberts wrote a book sharing his research on this amazing survival story, Four Against The Arctic. After years of research regarding the four Russians, Roberts was able to spend two weeks on the desolate Halvmåneøya to further pursue his research. He concluded, although not definitively, that the men were probably on Halvmåneøya and not Edgeøya.

This island is the main setting for the 2014 Norwegian movie Operation Arctic.

== Sources ==
- Conway, W. M. 1906. No Man’s Land: A History of Spitsbergen from Its Discovery in 1596 to the Beginning of the Scientific Exploration of the Country. Cambridge: At the University Press.
- Stange, Rolf (2012). Spitsbergen-Svalbard. A complete guide to the arctic archipelago.
- Norwegian Polar Institute: Place names in Norwegian polar areas
