= Langåra =

Island in Tiholmane, Svalbard, Norway

Coordinates: 76°59′N 21°58′E

Langåra is one of the islands comprising Tiholmane, part of Thousand Islands, an island group south of Edgeøya. It is named after an island in Oslofjorden, Norway.
