= Gerard Valck =

Dutch engraver, publisher and cartographer (1652–1726)

Gerard Valck (30 September 1652 – 21 October 1726) was a Dutch engraver, publisher and cartographer.

== Biography ==
Valck was born in Amsterdam on 30 September 1652 to an Amsterdam silversmith. He was a student of Dutch engraver and printmaker Abraham Blooteling and later became his assistant. Together, they moved to London, where Valk continued to work with print and map dealers. In 1673, he married Blooteling's sister Maria and they had a son, Leonard. Soon after Leonard's birth in 1675, Valk returned to Amsterdam. There, he was registered as a citizen on December 8, 1679. He trained under the Dutch engraver and printmaker Abraham Blooteling, later becoming his assistant. During the 1670s, the two moved to London, where Valck worked among English print and map dealers.

== Career ==
=== London period and printmaking ===
During the 1670s, while living in London, Valck worked primarily as an engraver and mezzotint maker, frequently collaborating with Abraham Blooteling. He produced portraits, including depictions of members of the English nobility, and published much of his own work himself. His earliest dated mezzotint, Sleeping Cupid (1677), was based on a painting by the Italian artist Guido Reni. Valck also produced engravings and mezzotints after works by artists including Peter Lely, Gérard de Lairesse and Philip Tideman.

=== Publishing and cartography in Amsterdam ===
After returning to Amsterdam in the mid-1670s, Valck increasingly expanded his activities into publishing and cartography. In 1680, he entered into a publishing partnership with Pieter Schenk the Elder, a German-born Dutch engraver and publisher who later married Valck's sister in 1687. Together, the Valck and Schenk families operated a publishing business producing maps, atlases, prints and printed globes.

=== Map and globe publishing ===
From the late seventeenth century onward, Valck worked primarily as a publisher specializing in maps and globes in Amsterdam. The firm later took over the former Hondius publishing shop and acquired part of the stock of the Visscher family, both associated with Amsterdam's map and print trade. Valck also published print series depicting subjects including houses belonging to the House of Orange-Nassau, trades and professions, fountains, chimneys and birds.

== Death ==
He died in Amsterdam on 21 October 1726.

== Gallery ==
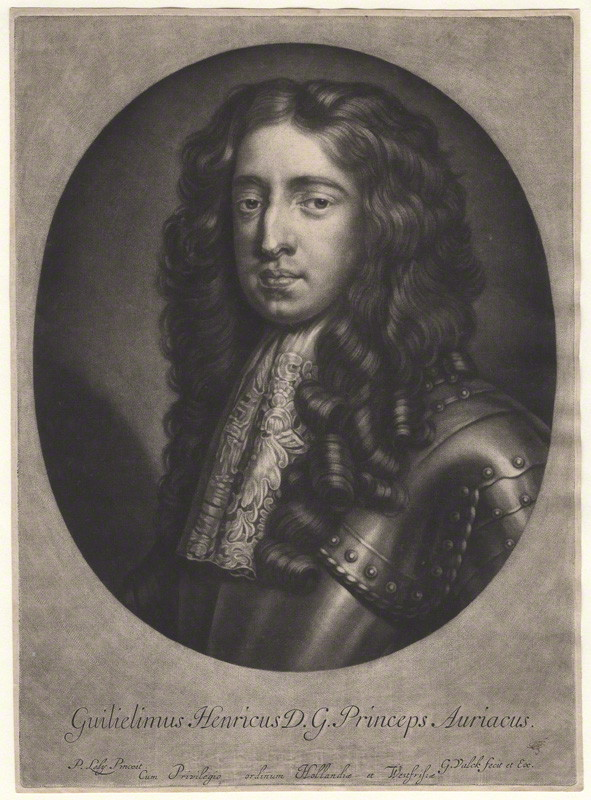

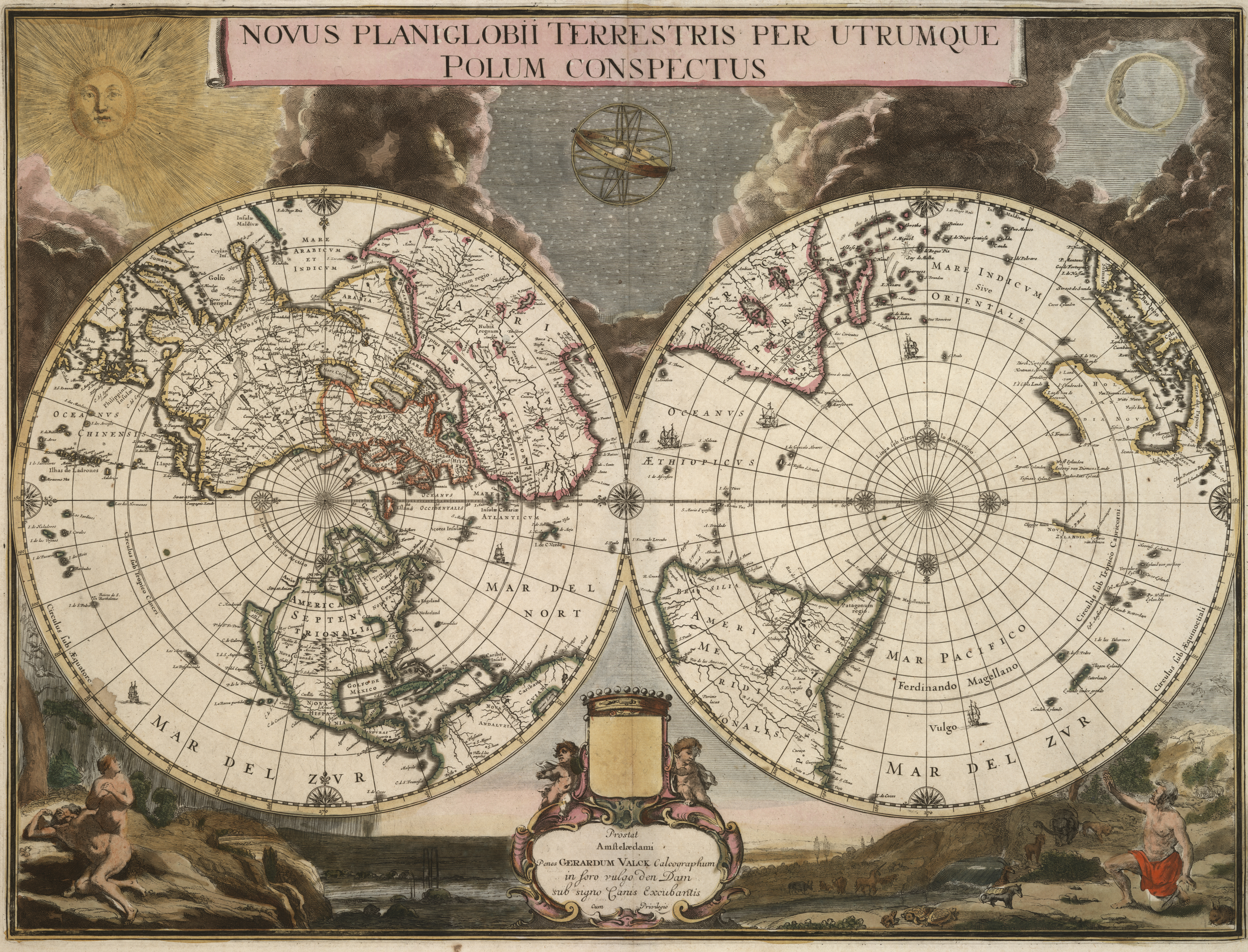

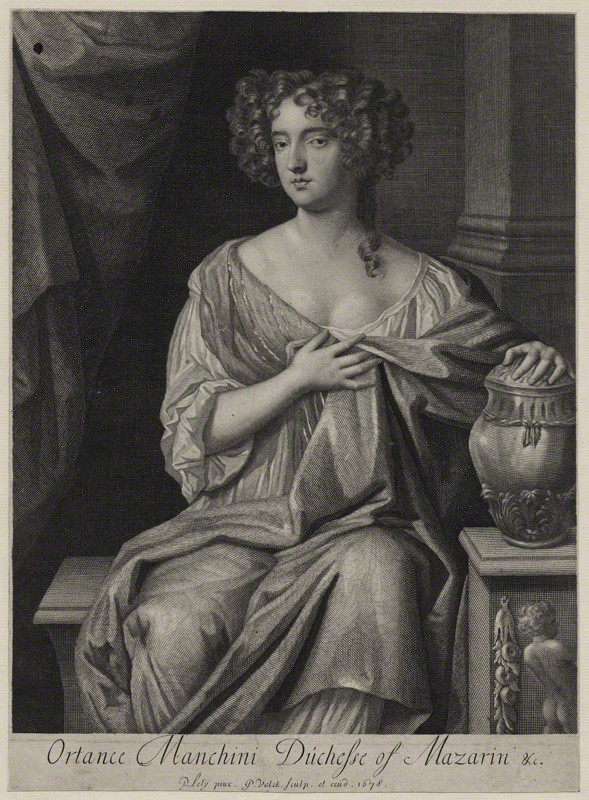

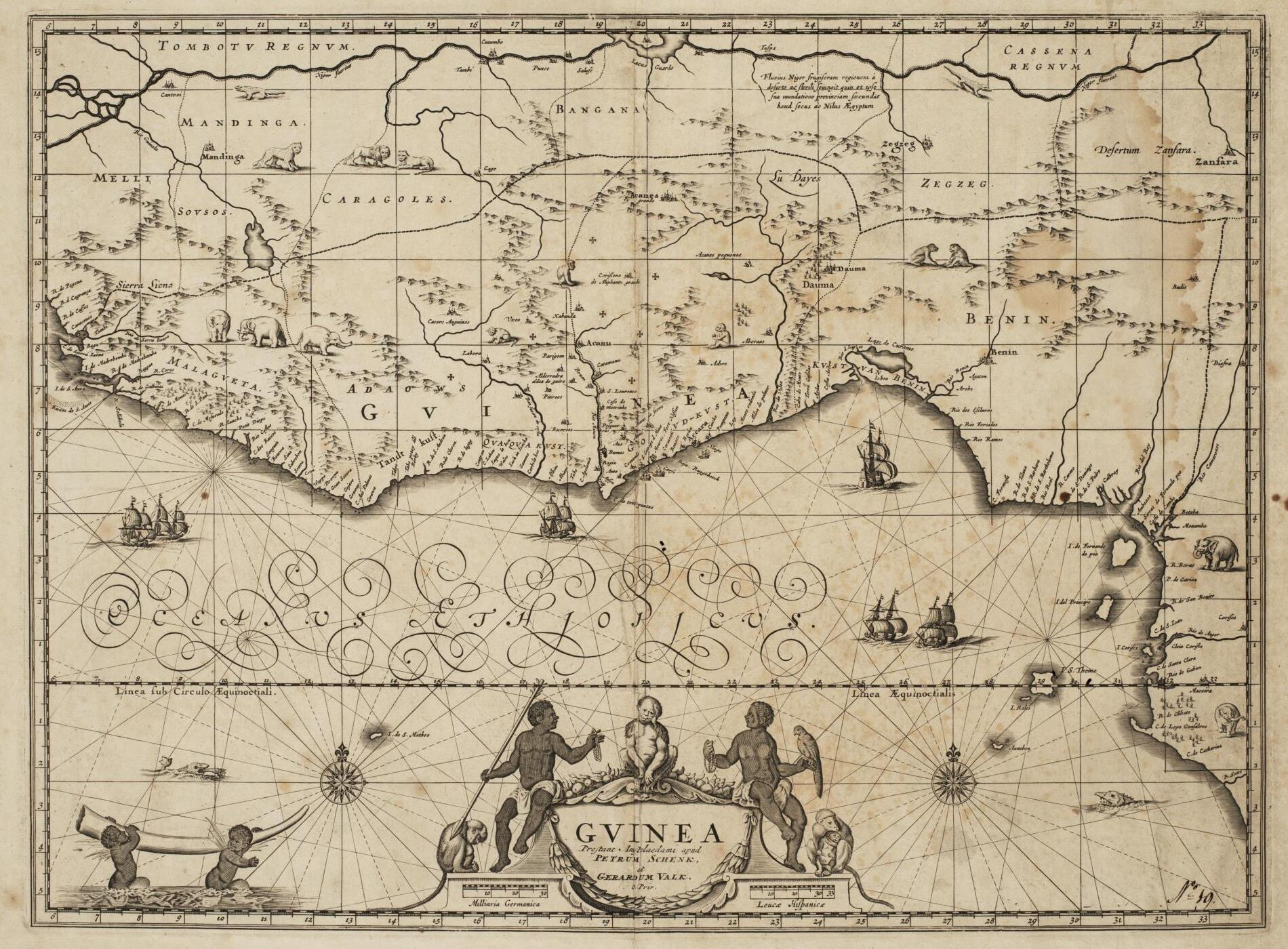

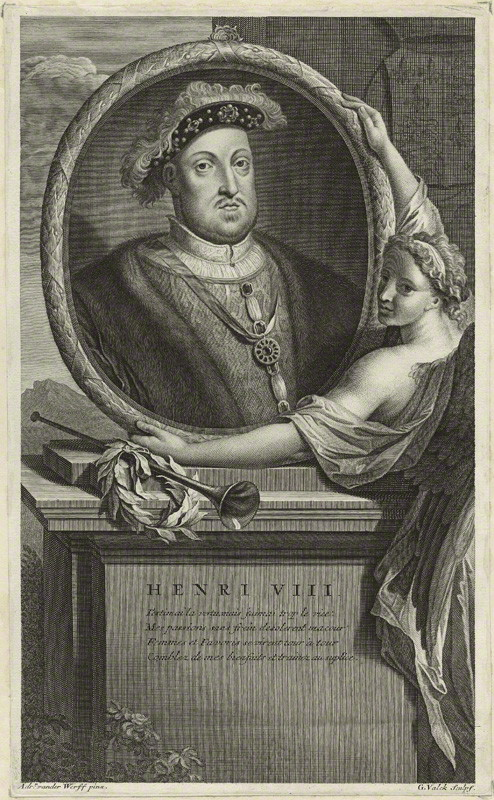
