= Tjuvfjorden =

Fjord in Svalbard, Norway

Coordinates: 77°20′N 22°00′E

Tjuvfjorden (English: Robber or Thief Fjord) is a 45 km long and up to 30 km wide fjord separating Edgeøya’s two southern promontories, Kvalpynten (Whale Point) and Svarthuken (old name: Negro Point).

The fjord was originally named Deicrowe's Sound by the English in 1616 after Benjamin Decrow, who was a leading figure of the Muscovy Company from 1610 onwards. This name appears on the Muscovy Company's map (1625) down to at least William Scoresby’s (1820).

== References and sources ==
Sources

- Norwegian Polar Institute: Place names in Norwegian polar areas
- Purchas, S. 1625. Hakluytus Posthumus or Purchas His Pilgrimes: Contayning a History of the World in Sea Voyages and Lande Travells by Englishmen and others. Volumes XIII and XIV (Reprint 1906 J. Maclehose and sons).
