= Thousand Islands (Svalbard) =

Island group in Svalbard, Norway

Coordinates: 77°00′N 21°30′E

Thousand Islands (Svalbard) (Svalbard)

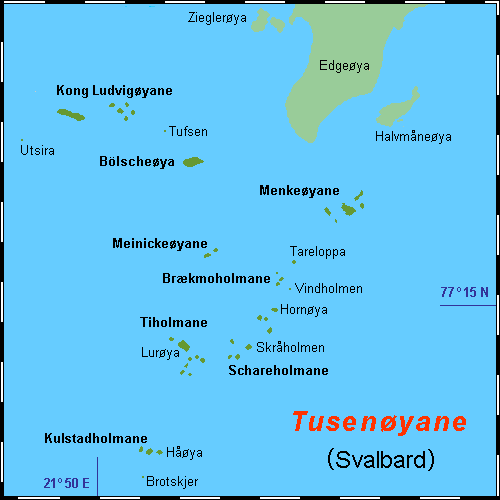
Map of Thousand Islands

Thousand Islands (Norwegian: Tusenøyane) is a group of small islands south of Edgeøya. They form part of the Svalbard archipelago. The group consists of over forty islands and islets, including Brotskjer, Kulstadholmane, Utsira, Tufsen, Kong Ludvigøyane, Bölscheøya, Hornøya, Tiholmane, Meinickeøyane, Sletteøya, Schareholmane, Skråholmen, Brækmoholmane, Tareloppa, Vindholmen, and Menkeøyane.

== Nature ==
=== Geology ===
The islands consist entirely of dolerite and diabase, intrusive igneous rocks formed during the Cretaceous period. These rocks originated as magma intrusions that cooled and solidified within the upper crust, contributing to the barren, boulder-strewn surfaces characteristic of the archipelago, which result from extensive glacial erosion over millennia. Unlike nearby Edgeøya, which features significant Triassic sedimentary layers of sandstone, siltstone, and shale, the Thousand Islands lack substantial sedimentary cover, exposing the dolerite bedrock directly.

Key landforms in the Thousand Islands include steep rocky shores, low-lying plateaus, and scattered small islets rising from shallow surrounding waters, with elevations generally below 200 meters. The absence of glaciers—unlike in the glaciated northern and eastern parts of Svalbard—has left the bedrock highly exposed, promoting weathering processes that produce extensive blockfields and patterned ground from permafrost action.

=== Flora and Fauna ===
The region's vegetation primarily belongs to the Arctic tundra zone. The islands are rich in vulnerable moss tundra.

Tusenøyane (Thousand Islands) are one of the most important breeding areas in the Søraust-Svalbard region. Eiders, Brent geese, and red-throated divers frequent the area. Nesting often occurs in lakes. The region has large mammals such as walrus and polar bears. They use the shallow waters as a feeding area. The region hosts about 12 protected animals.

== History ==
The Dutchman Joris Carolus was the first to distinctly mark a group of small islands south of Edgeøya. The Muscovy Company's map (1625) showed a vague mass of islands as well, some labelled, such as Wester I., Beare Iland, Heling I., and the Hopeless Iles. (perhaps Kong Ludvigøyane). The cartographers Gerard Valck and Peter Schenk the Elder were the first to place a "great vague mass of islands stretching round the coast" south of Edgeøya. William Scoresby (1820) is thought to have been the first to label them with the popular name of Thousand Islands, the name they retain to this day.

== Related reading ==
- Conway, W. M. (1906) No Man’s Land: A History of Spitsbergen from Its Discovery in 1596 to the Beginning of the Scientific Exploration of the Country (Cambridge University Press) ISBN 978-1274351821
- Purchas, S. (1625) Hakluytus Posthumus or Purchas His Pilgrimes: Contayning a History of the World in Sea Voyages and Lande Travells by Englishmen and others. Volumes XIII and XIV (Reprint 1906 J. Maclehose and sons).
