= Edgeøya =

Norwegian island

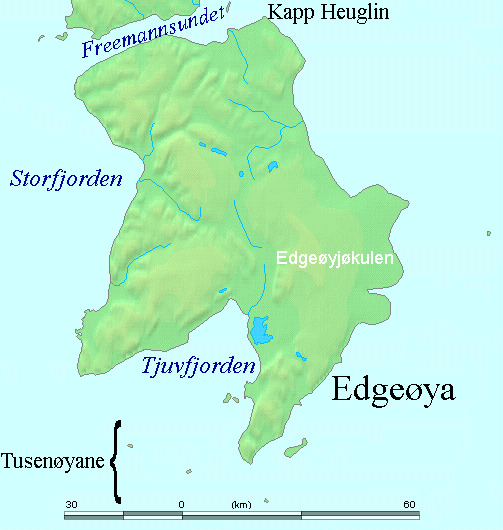
- Interactive map of Edgeøya

Geography
- Location: Arctic Ocean
- Coordinates: 77°45′N 22°30′E
- Archipelago: Svalbard
- Area: 5,073 km^{2} (1,959 sq mi); 2,102 km^{2} (812 sq mi) glaciated
- Coastline: 502 km (311.9 mi)
- Highest elevation: 590 m (1940 ft)
- Highest point: Kvitisen-Storskavlen

Administration
- Norway

Demographics
- Population: 0

Edgeøya (Norwegian: [ˈɛdʒˌœ͡ʏɑ]), anglicised as Edge Island, is a Norwegian island located in southeast of the Svalbard archipelago; with an area of 5,073 square kilometres (1,960 sq mi), it is the third-largest island in this archipelago. An Arctic island, it forms part of the Søraust-Svalbard Nature Reserve, home to polar bears and reindeer. An ice field covers its eastern side. The island takes its name from Thomas Edge (died 1624), an English merchant and whaler. It is seldom visited today and development of tourist facilities is forbidden by law because of its nature reserve status.

== History ==
The history of Edgeøya's discovery has been a matter of dispute. Thomas Edge, writing in 1622, claimed the island was discovered by one of his ships in 1616. However, Joris Carolus, in a map published in 1614 and allegedly based on discoveries made by him the same year, shows what appears to be Edgeøya's south coast. Carolus showed the coastline split into two parts: "Onbekende Cust" (meaning "Unknown Coast" in Dutch) in the west, and "Morfyn" in the east. Islands are shown offshore of Morfyn. Martin Conway argued in 1901 that Carolus' chart indicated he discovered Edgeøya, but, as Wielder points out, Conway was ignorant of a map (engraved in 1612) by the Dutch cartographer Petrus Plancius, which illustrated a coastline to the east of Spitsbergen. The coastline, indented, with islands offshore, was labelled "Gerrits Eylant". Wielder believed this to be the first record of Edgeøya's south coast.

Schilder, an expert on Dutch cartography, said Carolus merely copied both coastlines from earlier charts, while he believed that Plancius had copied some names from a chart by Mouris Willemsz, unknown to Wielder, that was published in 1608 or earlier by Cornelis Claeszoon (British Library, London). Willemsz's chart, which Schilder says shows Edgeøya labeled as "Groen Landt", does not show Edgeøya at all, but only shows a single coastline (not two) that is supposed to represent Spitsbergen. In fact, what appears to be Bjørnøya is shown to the southeast of Spitsbergen. Plancius had thus only created a duplicate Spitsbergen. Carolus, as well, made a duplicate Spitsbergen, as his Morfyn has an uncanny resemblance to Willemsz's Groen Landt. This would indicate that the island would not have been discovered until 1616, as claimed by Edge. A 1617 letter written between the English whalers proves that Europeans had discovered the island at least at that late of date, or earlier, as Edge claims.

Four Russian sailors were marooned on Edgeøya, or a small island off the coast of Edgeøya, from 1743 until September 1749. Three survived to tell an epic tale of survival. Author David Roberts wrote a book about his research on this story, Four Against The Arctic. He concluded, although not definitively, that the men were probably on a small island to the southeast of Edgeøya called Halvmåneøya, or Half Moon Island.

While no major settlement grew upon Edgeøya, whaling and walrus hunting were extensive industries in the area. Remains of these can be found offshore of Edgeøya, on Bölscheøya in the Thousand Islands group.

== Geography and ecology ==
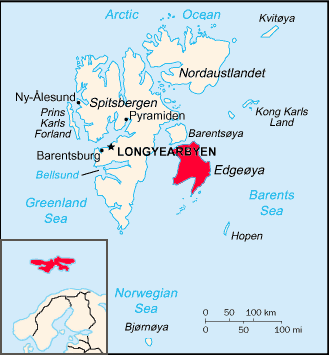
Location of Edgeøya in Svalbard

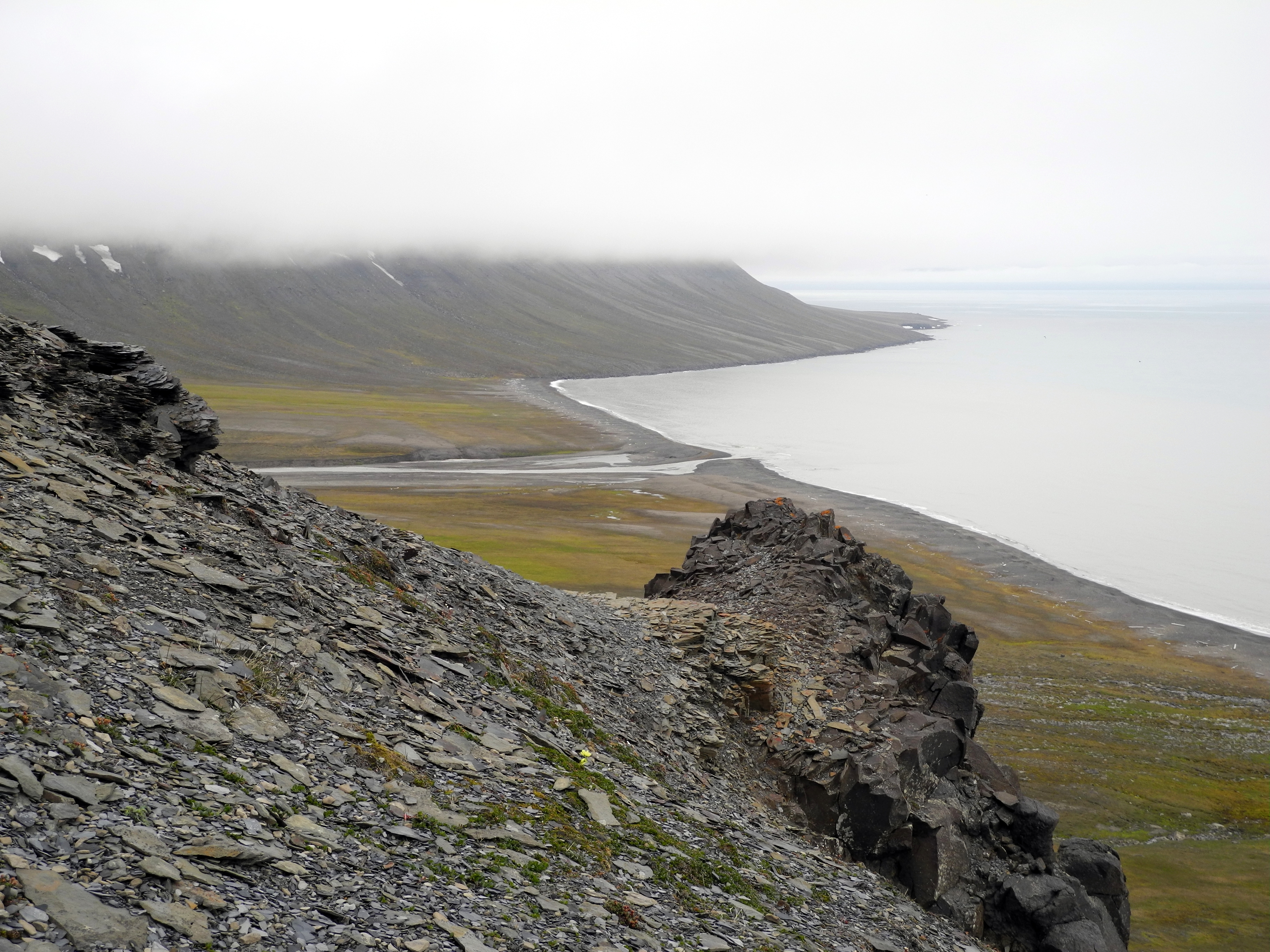
Kapp Lee and the Storfjorden

Edgeøya is located at geographical co-ordinates 77°40′N 22°30′E. To the west lies Storfjorden, which separates Edgeøya from Spitsbergen. To the north, the sound known as Freemansundet lies between Edgeøya and Barentsøya. In the northeast, Olgastretet separates Edgeøya from Kong Karls Land. Minor island groups lay to the east (Ryke Yseøyane) and to the south (Thousand Islands). The island's south coast in indented by its largest fjord, Tjuvfjorden. The island's northernmost point is Kapp Heuglin, a cape named in August 1870 for the German explorer Theodor von Heuglin (1824–76), during the Heuglin-Zeil expedition.

Geologically, the island resembles central Spitsbergen, with Mesozoic rocks (specifically, Triassic shales with subordinate sandstones, with occasional diabase intrusions, and, in the southwest, strata from the Jurassic), the effects of glacial erosion, and appearance of polar ice caps. On the eastern side of the island is the large glacier of Edgeøyjøkulen.

Along with Barentsøya and some of the neighbouring islands, Edgeøya forms part of South East Svalbard Nature Reserve, established by the Norwegian government in 1973. There is a significant reindeer population, and the island is an important site for polar bear reproduction; moreover, the polar bear population in this Barents Sea area is a unique deme (unique genetic population).

== In popular culture ==
Edgeøya is the setting for the novel The Solitude of Thomas Cave (2007), by Georgina Harding, in which the title character, on a wager, successfully over-winters on the island in 1616–17.

It is also the setting for the 2002 book Four Against the Arctic by David Roberts, which tells the true story of 4 Pomory sailors who spent 6 years on the island in the mid-18th century after their ship was destroyed.

== See also ==
- List of islands of Norway
