= Taqulittuq =

19th C. Inuk interpreter and guide on Arctic expeditions

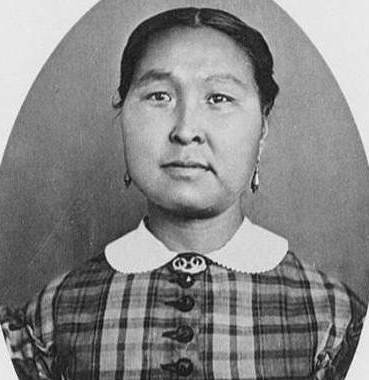
Taqulittuq in the United States

Taqulittuq (Inuktitut: ᑕᖁᓕᑦᑐᖅ, often transliterated as Tookoolito; also known by the English name Hannah; c. 1838 – December 31, 1876) was an Inuk interpreter and guide. She and her husband Ipirvik (also known as Joe) worked alongside Arctic explorer Charles Francis Hall and joined him in his search for Franklin's lost expedition in the 1860s, as well as the Polaris expedition to reach the North Pole.

== Biography ==
=== Early life and family ===
Taqulittuq was born at Cape Searle in the Cumberland Sound or Qikiqtaaluk Region, or Baffin Island area. Her brother, Eenoolooapik, traveled in 1839 with whaler William Penny to Aberdeen. Other relatives, Totocatapik and Kur-king, were also renowned as travelers. In 1852, Taqulittuq began learning English from a British whaler, William Barron.

=== Travels ===
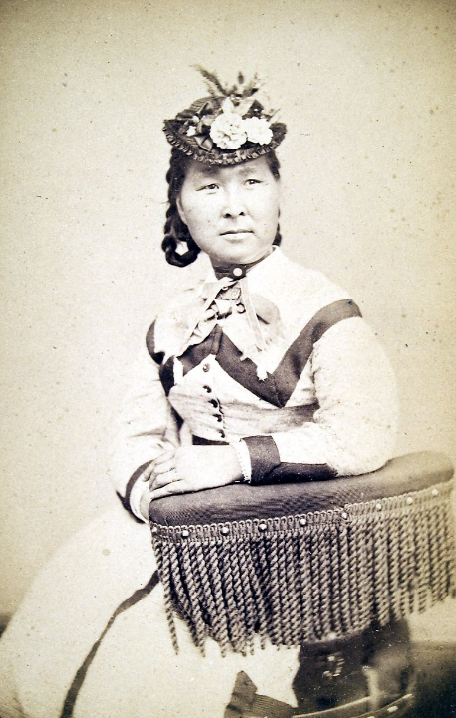
Taqulittuq at an exposition

In 1853, a whaling captain named John Bowlby (sometimes called Thomas Bowlby) brought her with Ipirvik and an unrelated child, Akulukjuk ("Harlookjoe"), to England. The three Inuit were exhibited in various venues throughout the north of the country. They were eventually brought to London, where they were received by Queen Victoria at Windsor Castle. She and Ipirvik dined with the Queen and Prince Albert. Unlike many less scrupulous showmen, Bowlby returned the group to the Arctic.

In 1860, the explorer Charles Francis Hall met Taqulittuq and Ipirvik, hiring them as a translator and guide on his first expedition to search for remains of the Franklin expedition. Local inhabitants led him to the remains of the Frobisher expedition instead. Sidney O. Budington captained the expedition's ship, the George Henry.

She and Ipirvik returned with Hall in the fall of 1862, and appeared alongside him at his lectures. Later that year, Hall arranged for them to be exhibited at Barnum's American Museum in New York, where they drew enormous crowds, advertised as "Esquimaux Indians ... from the Arctic regions ... the first and only inhabitants of these frozen regions ever brought to" the United States. Not long after, Hall agreed to a second exhibition at Boston's Aquarial Gardens, but when no payment was forthcoming, decided that such shows were not worth the risk to Taqulittuq and Ipirvik’s health. Nevertheless, they accompanied him on his East Coast lecture tour throughout the early months of 1863, and possibly, as a result, Taqulittuq's young son Butterfly became ill and died of pneumonia. Inconsolable, Taqulittuq became suicidal, but eventually regained her health.

Along with Ipirvik, she returned with Hall to the Arctic on his second land expedition from 1864 to 1869. During this expedition, Taqulittuq gave birth to a son "King William," who died in infancy; she and Ipirvik then adopted a two-year-old Inuk girl whom they called simply Panik (Inuktitut: "daughter").

Taqulittuq and Ipirvik also accompanied Hall on his final expedition aboard the Polaris. Along with their daughter Panik and Hans Hendrik, they were among the party left behind after Hall's death, when the ship abruptly broke loose of the ice and failed to return. This party endured a remarkable six-month drift on a gradually-shrinking ice-floe, kept alive only by Ipirvik and Hans's hunting skills; the entire party was rescued by a sealer in April 1873.

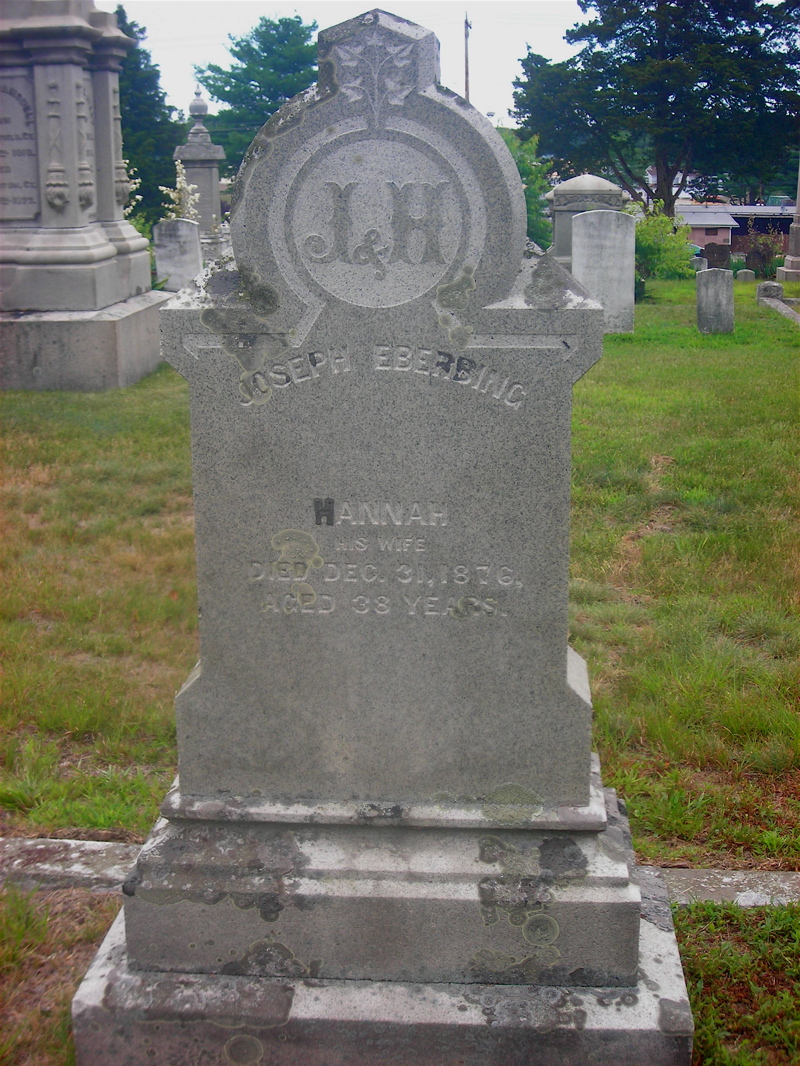
Taqulittuq's grave in Groton

During the investigation into Hall's death, both Taqulittuq and Ipirvik testified, both corroborating Hall's belief that he had been poisoned, but their evidence was discounted.

=== Later life ===
They returned to Groton, Connecticut, to a home that whaling captain that Hall and Sidney O. Budington had helped establish. Ipirvik returned to the Arctic several times to work as a guide, while Taqulittuq remained behind, caring for Panik and working as a seamstress.

After Panik—whose health had been poor since her experience on the ice floe—died at the age of nine, Hannah fell into declining health. Ipirvik was with her when she died on December 31, 1876; she was buried in the Starr Burying Ground not far from the Budington family plot.

== Legacy ==
Tookoolito Inlet, located on the western side of Cornelius Grinnell Bay in Nunavut, and Hannah Island, in the mouth of Bessels Fjord, North Greenland, is named after her. Taqulittuq and her husband were named Persons of National Historic Significance in 1981.

== Bibliography ==
- Foster, M. (2004). 100 Canadian Heroines. Toronto: Dundern Press. ISBN 1550025147.
- Harper, K. (1989). "History on a headstone: a long-forgotten chapter of Inuit heroism". Above and Beyond. 1 (2): 53–62.
- Jones, H. G. (2002). "Teaching the explorers: some Inuit contributions to Arctic discoveries". Polar Geography. 26 (1): 4–20. Bibcode:2002PolGe..26....4J. doi:10.1080/789609350. S2CID 128611222.
- Loomis, C. C. (1971). Weird and Tragic Shores: The Story of Charles Francis Hall. Lincoln: University of Nebraska Press. ISBN 9780375755255.
- Nickerson, S. (2002). Midnight to the North: The Inuit Woman Who Saved the Polaris Expedition. Tarcher Books.
- Petrone, P. (1988). Northern Voices: Inuit Writing in English. University of Toronto Press. ISBN 080207717X.
- Potter, R. (2007). Arctic Spectacles: The Frozen North in Visual Culture, 1818–1875. University of Washington Press. ISBN 978-0295986807.
