= Insubordination =

Act of willfully disobeying one's superior

Insubordination is the act of willfully disobeying a lawful order of one's superior. It is generally a punishable offense in hierarchical organizations such as the armed forces, which depend on people lower in the chain of command obeying orders.

== Military ==
Insubordination is when a service member willfully disobeys the lawful orders of a superior officer. If a military officer disobeys the lawful orders of their civilian superiors, this also counts. For example, the head of state in many countries, is also the most superior officer of the military as the Commander in Chief. Generally, however, an officer or soldier may disobey an unlawful order to the point of mutiny (see Nuremberg defense).

In the U.S. military, insubordination is covered under Article 91 of the Uniform Code of Military Justice. It covers disobeying lawful orders as well as disrespectful language or even striking a superior. The article for insubordination should not be confused with the article for contempt. While Article 91 of the UCMJ deals predominantly with disobeying or disrespecting a superior and applies to enlisted members and warrant officers, Article 88 involves the use of contemptuous words against certain appointed or elected officials and only applies to commissioned officers.

According to a 2021 typology, military disobedience can take four forms: "defiance, refinement, grudging obedience, and exit." A 2019 study argued that military disobedience may arise when a tension is created in the social networks of a soldier, which gives the soldier motivations and justifications to disobey orders.

== Private sector ==
Other types of hierarchical structures, especially corporations, may use insubordination as a reason for dismissal or censure of an employee.

There have been court cases in the United States which have involved charges of insubordination from the employer with counter charges of infringement of First Amendment rights from the employee. A number of these cases have reached the U.S. Supreme Court usually involving a conflict between an institution of higher education and a faculty member.

In the modern workplace in the Western world, hierarchical power relationships are usually sufficiently internalized so that the issue of formal charges of insubordination are rare. In his book Disciplined Minds, American physicist and writer Jeff Schmidt points out that professionals are trusted to run organizations in the interests of their employers. Because employers cannot be on hand to manage every decision, professionals are trained "to make sure that the subtext of each and every detail of their work advances the right interests—or skewers the disfavored ones" in the absence of overt control.

== Notable examples ==
There have been a number of famous and notorious people who have committed insubordination or publicly objected to an organizational practice.

- Emil Bessels – German Arctic explorer who undermined and likely poisoned the Polaris expedition's commander, Charles Francis Hall
- Daniel V. Gallery – U.S. Navy admiral whose published articles played a role in the public debate during the Revolt of the Admirals
- George Grosz – German artist and soldier
- Mike Jackson – Commanding Officer of KFOR during the Kosovo War. Countermanded an order by Wesely Clark (the Supreme Allied Commander Europe) thus avoiding an international incident at Pristina Airport.
- Douglas MacArthur – U.S. general relieved of command by President Harry S. Truman during the Korean War
- Billy Mitchell – U.S. Army Air Corps commander during World War I and proponent of air power during the interwar years
- Stanislav Petrov – Soviet Air Defence Forces officer who refused to report a detected missile strike averting nuclear war
- Albert Pike – charged by the Confederate Army with insubordination
- Jackie Robinson – American baseball player accused of insubordination while in the military, but exonerated at a court martial
- Thomas Scott – executed by Louis Riel
- Hunter S. Thompson – American writer, fired from Time magazine
- Jeffrey Wigand – vice president of Brown & Williamson, revealed tobacco industry practices

== See also ==
- Contumacy
- Civil disobedience
- Contempt of court
- Criticism
- Discrediting
- Failure to obey a police order
- Fragging
- Mutiny
- Rebellion
- Whistleblowing
- Court cases involving insubordination:
  - Rendell-Baker v. Kohn, 457 U.S. 830 (1982 US Supreme Court)
  - Schenck v. United States, 249 U.S. 47 (1919 US Supreme Court)
  - Perry v. Sindermann, 408 U.S. 593
