= Kapp Bessels =

Headland of Barentsøya, Svalbard

Coordinates: 78.589°N 21.762°E

Kapp Bessels is a headland at Barentsøya, Svalbard. It is located at the northeastern coast of the island, and east of the glacier of Besselsbreen. The headland is named after German Arctic explorer Emil Bessels.
