= Ormholet =

Strait in Svalbard, Norway

Coordinates: 78.636°N 21.218°E

Ormholet is a sound between Barentsøya and Kükenthaløya, at the inner part of Ginevra Bay, Svalbard. It has a length of about one nautical mile, and is about 150 m wide. The tidal currents can be strong and change rapidly.
