= Grima (Svalbard) =

River in Svalbard, Norway

Grima is a river at Barentsøya, Svalbard, which flows through the valley of Grimdalen, from Barentsjøkulen to Ginevra Bay.
