= Heimarka =

Plain in Svalbard, Norway

Coordinates: 78°32′01″N 21°13′07″E

Heimarka is a plain at Barentsøya, Svalbard. It is located between the glacier of Besselsbreen and the valley of Grimdalen. The lake of Veslemjøsa is situated in the field.
