= Dorstbukta =

Bay of Svalbard

Coordinates: 78°34′58″N 21°29′02″E

Dorstbukta is a bay at Barentsøya, Svalbard. It is located at the northern coast of the island, between Frankenhalvøya and Besselsbreen. The bay is named after Franz Joseph Dorst, member of an Arctic expedition in 1869.
