= Willybreen =

Glacier in Svalbard, Norway

Coordinates: 78.4648°N 22.0111°E

Willybreen is a glacier on Barentsøya, Svalbard. It is an offshoot of Barentsjøkulen, reaching down to the sea in the eastern direction. The glacier is named after German zoologist Willy Kükenthal.
