= Hans Hendrik =

Greenlandic explorer

- Suersaq
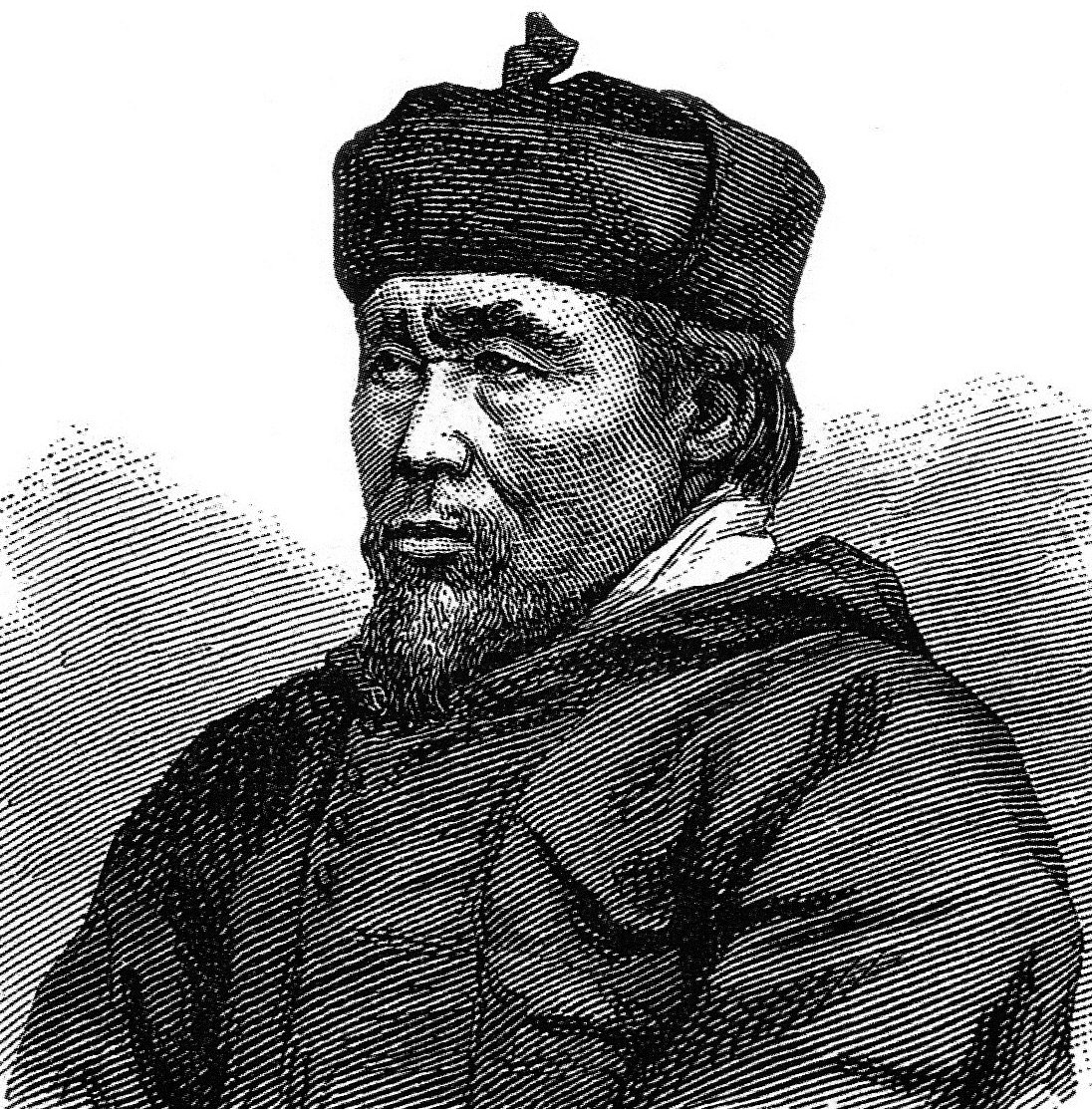
- Hendrik in 1883
- Born: 2 June 1832; Fiskenæsset, South Greenland
- Died: 11 August 1889 (aged 57); Godhavn, North Greenland
- Known for: Arctic exploration
- Expeditions: Second Grinnell expedition; Hayes' expedition; Polaris expedition; British Arctic expedition

Hans Hendrik (Greenlandic: Suersaq; 2 June 1832 – 11 August 1889) was a Kalaaleq interpreter, Arctic explorer, and the first Inuk to publish an account of his travels. He was born in the southern settlement of Fiskenæsset.

== Expeditions ==
=== Second Grinnell expedition ===
Hendrik was hired by the American explorer Elisha Kent Kane for the 1853–1855 second Grinnell expedition to search for the lost Franklin expedition. He established his worth in the winter of 1854, when participating in a search for four of the men who were lying frozen and disabled somewhere northwest of the ship, which was beset in the ice in Rensellaer Bay.

Hendrik located their sledge track, which brought the rescue party to the men. He also assisted with communication with the local Inuit, and was instrumental in hunting efforts, including tracking and finding a wounded caribou in February 1855 when the men were beginning to starve and show signs of scurvy. It was due to Henrik's ability and effort that the important sledging journey to Cape Constitution was completed. For these efforts, Hendrik's agreed upon salary was two barrels of flour and 52 pounds of salt pork.

After the Grinnell expedition, Hendrik returned to Qeqertarsuatsiaat, in western Greenland, where he married. In a report submitted by Sir Francis Leopold McClintock on 21 September 1859, near the conclusion of his own expedition in search of Franklin, it was reported by the Inut near Cape York that Hans was residing at Whale Sound.

=== Hayes' expedition ===
Hendrik made his second northern voyage aboard the United States under Isaac Israel Hayes' American expedition of 1860–1861. At the end of August 1860, Hayes touched at Cape York and picked up Hans, his wife, and child. On 21 December, Hans and astronomer August Sonntag began their ice journey—a journey from which Sonntag did not return. Hans managed to eventually reach an Inuit settlement, saving his own life. The United States reached Upernavik on 15 August 1861, near which Hendrik and his family would remain for the next three years. Following that, they returned to Fiskernaes.

=== Polaris expedition ===
Hendrik's third journey on the Polaris expedition of 1871–1873, led by Charles Francis Hall under Captain Budington. Hans joined the voyage, along with his wife and four children. Hall died during the voyage of apoplexy on 8 November 1871. Hendrik was among the party left behind after Hall's death when the Polaris broke loose of the ice and failed to return.

During the party's six-month drift on a gradually-shrinking ice-floe, Hendrik and the Canadian Inuk Ebierbing managed to provide food for the entire party; they were eventually picked up by a sealer in April 1873. Following this journey, Hendrik made a trip to America, including visits to Washington D.C. and New York, before returning home to Fiskernaes.

=== British Arctic expedition ===
Hendrik's last sea voyage was under George Strong Nares in the British Arctic expedition of 1875–1876. Hendrik presumably joined the crew of HMS Alert at Smith Sound before proceeding to the northernmost reaches of Greenland. The expedition encountered problems with pack ice and scurvy, spending one winter locked in the ice. Hendrik's hunting and handling of dogsleds contributed both to the exploration and the survival and ultimate rescue of most of the crew.

Hendrik retired from expedition support and worked as boatswain and laborer at the Greenland settlements. His arctic journeys made him wealthy by the standards of his community.

== Legacy ==
Hans Island is named after Hans Hendrik.

== Bibliography ==
- Hendrik, H. (1878). Memoirs of Hans Hendrik, the Arctic traveller. London: Trübner. OCLC 716198107.
- Holland, C. A. (1982). "Hendrik, Hans". In Halpenny, Francess G. (ed.). Dictionary of Canadian Biography. Vol. XI (1881–1890) (online ed.). University of Toronto Press.
- McClintock, F. L. (1859). Thirty years in the Arctic. Cincinnati: U.S. Book and Bible Co. OCLC 769247777.
- Mowat, F. M. (1973). The Polar Passion: The Quest for the North Pole. Toronto: McClelland & Stewart. ISBN 9780771066214.
- Rich, E. G (1934). Hans, the Eskimo: His Story of Arctic Adventure. Boston: Houghton Mifflin. OCLC 465629159.
