= Dalskilvatnet =

Lake

- Location in Svalbard
- Location: Barentsøya, Svalbard
- Coordinates: 78°29′00″N 21°00′00″E
- Type: natural freshwater lake
- Basin countries: Norway

Dalskilvatnet is a lake at Barentsøya, Svalbard. The lake separates the two valleys of Grimdalen, which drains to the north, and Sjodalen, which drains to the west.
