= Kükenthaløya =

Island in Svalbard, Norway

Coordinates: 78.6492°N 21.2265°E

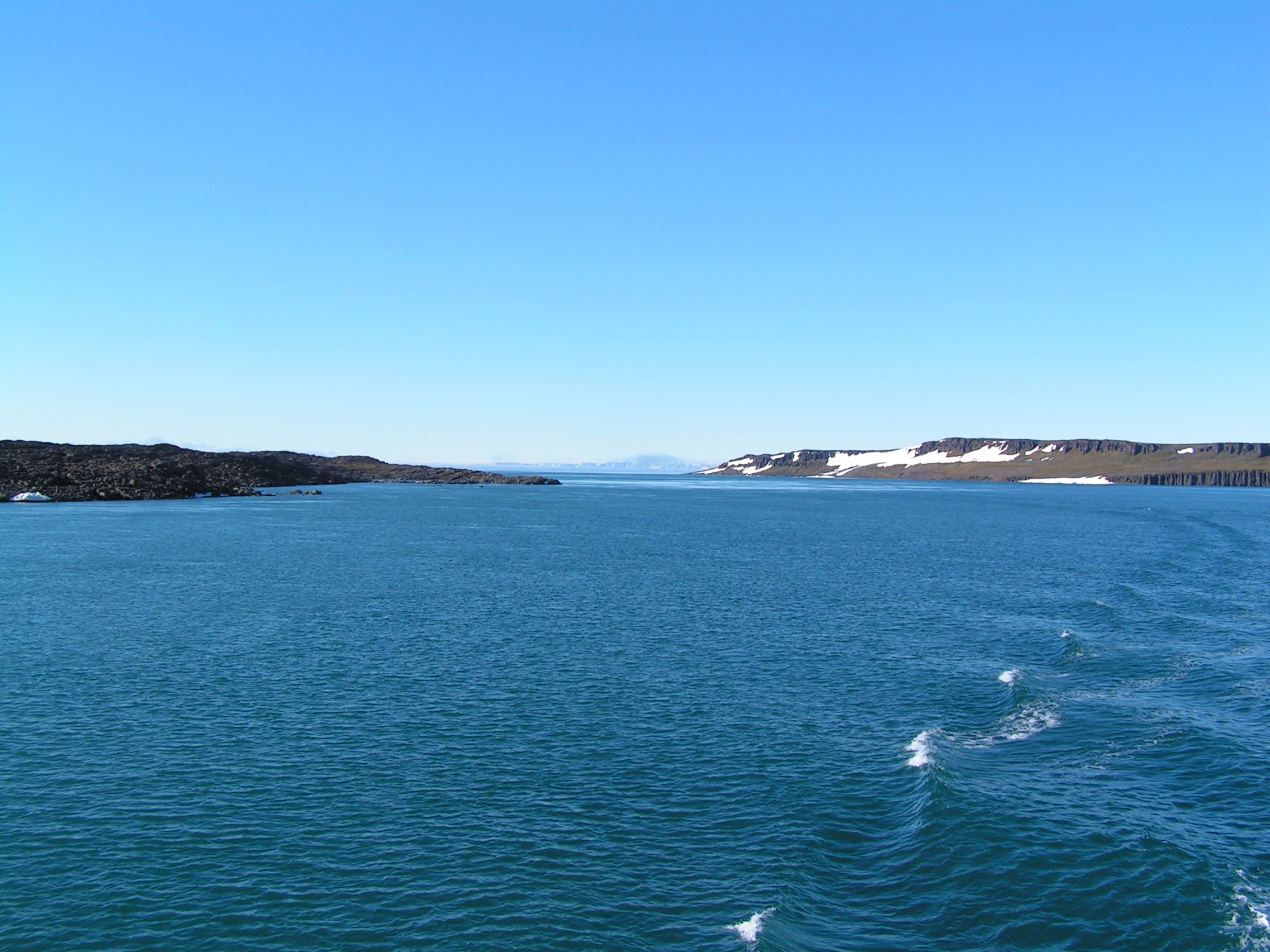
View of Heleysundet near Kükenthaløya

Kükenthaløya is an island between Barentsøya and Olav V Land, Svalbard. It is located south of the strait Heleysundet and north of Ormholet, at the inner part of Ginevra Bay. The island is named after German zoologist and Arctic explorer Willy Kükenthal.
