= Grimheia =

Mountain in Svalbard, Norway

Highest point
- Coordinates: 78°30′25″N 20°38′32″E

Geography
- Country: Norway

Grimheia is a mountainous area at Barentsøya, Svalbard. It extends over a length of about thirteen kilometers at the northern part of the island. East of the area is the valley of Grimdalen with the river of Grima.
