= Polaris expedition =

19th-century American polar expedition

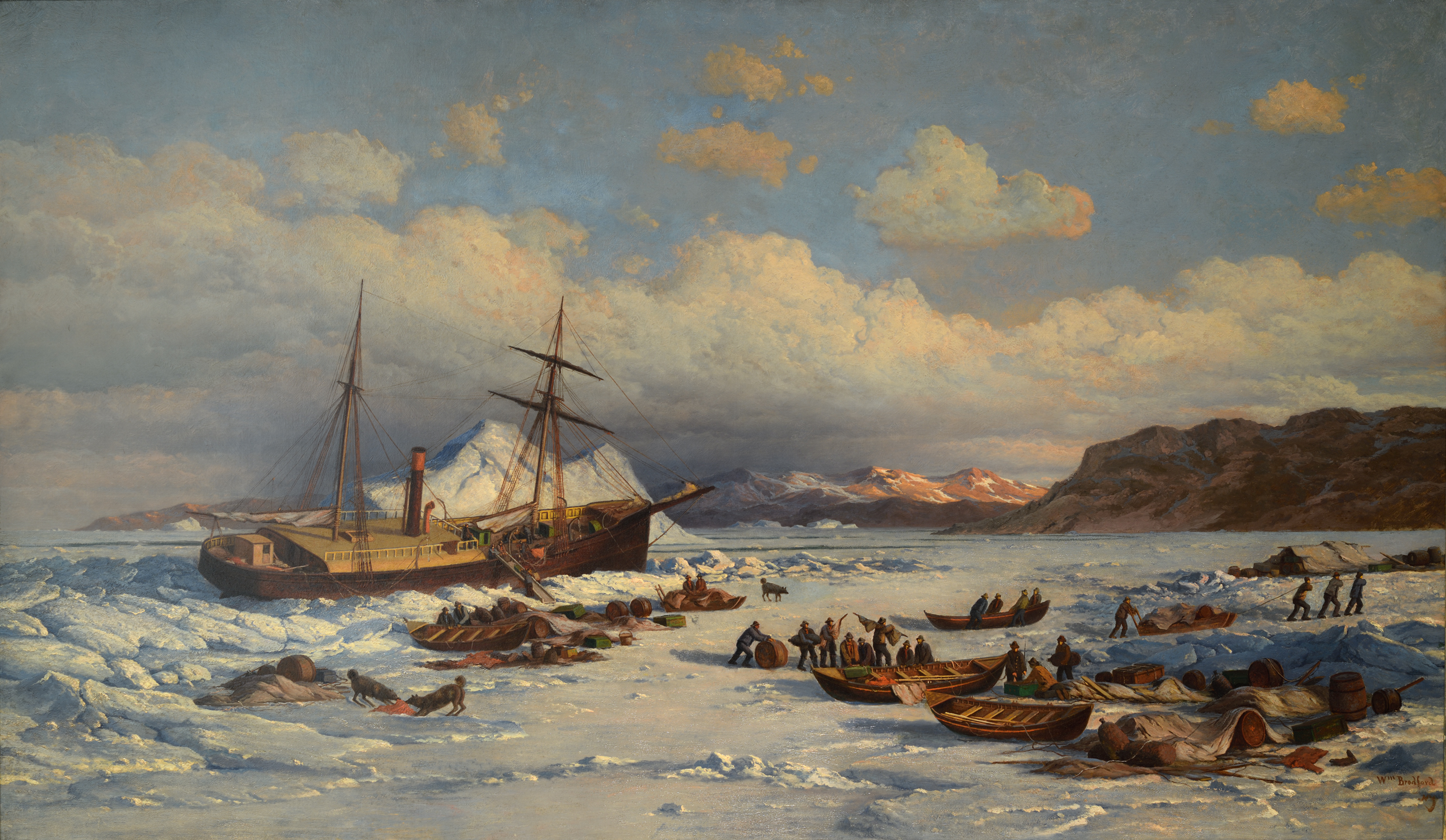
Voyage of the Polaris (1875), by William Bradford

The Polaris expedition of 1871–1873 was one of the first serious attempts to reach the North Pole after that of British naval officer Sir Edward Parry, who reached 82° 45′ N in 1827. Funded by the U.S. government, the expedition's notable achievement was reaching 82° 29′ N by ship, a record at the time.

The expedition was commanded by the experienced and self-taught Arctic explorer Charles Francis Hall, who had previously lived among the Inuit in the Arctic region during previous attempts to determine the fate of Franklin's lost expedition of 1845. Hall possessed the necessary survival skills, but lacked an academic background and had no experience leading men or commanding a ship. He had managed to secure the position of expedition commander based on his authority on the subject of the Arctic.

Polaris departed from New York City in June 1871. Barely underway, the expedition already found itself hampered by poor leadership. Insubordination loomed, mainly at the instigation of chief scientist Emil Bessels and meteorologist Frederick Meyer—both German—who looked down on what they perceived to be their unqualified commander. Bessels and Meyer were supported by the German half of the crew, further increasing tensions among a group of men that were already divided by nationality.

By October 1871, the expedition was wintering in Thank God Harbor, Greenland, and making preparations for the trip to the Pole. Hall suddenly fell ill and died, accusing members of his crew — particularly Bessels — of orchestrating his murder. On the way southward, nineteen members of the expedition became separated from their ship and drifted on an ice floe for six months and 1,800 miles (2,900 km) before being rescued. The damaged Polaris was run aground and wrecked near Etah in October 1872. The remaining men were able to survive the winter and were rescued the following summer.

A naval board of inquiry investigated Hall's death, but no charges were ever laid. However, an exhumation of his body in 1968 revealed he had ingested a large quantity of arsenic in the last two weeks of his life. Coupled with recently discovered affectionate letters written by both Hall and Bessels to Vinnie Ream, a young sculptor they met in New York while waiting for Polaris to be outfitted, suggests Bessels had a motive, besides the means, to kill Hall.

== Preparations ==
=== Origins ===
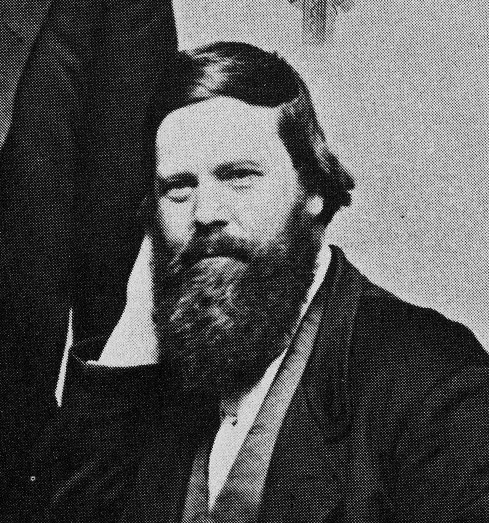
The only known photograph of Charles Francis Hall, in late 1870

In 1827, Sir Edward Parry led a British Royal Navy expedition with the aim to be the first men to reach the North Pole. In the next five decades following Parry's attempt, the Americans would mount three such expeditions: Elisha Kent Kane in 1853–1855, Isaac Israel Hayes in 1860–1861, and Charles Francis Hall with the Polaris in 1871–1873.

Hall was a Cincinnati businessman with no notable academic background or sailing experience. He had previously worked as a blacksmith and as an engraver, and for a couple of years had published his own newspaper, the Cincinnati Occasional (later renamed the Daily Press). Energetic and enterprising, Hall enthusiastically wrote about the latest technological innovations; he was fascinated by hot air balloon travel and praised the new transatlantic telegraph cable. He was also a voracious reader, captivated especially by the Arctic. His focus was directed towards the region around 1857, amid popular speculation about the fate of Franklin's lost expedition of 1845.

Hall spent the next few years studying the reports of previous explorers and trying to raise money for his own expedition. As a result of his charisma and personality, he was able eventually to launch two solo expeditions in search of Franklin and his crew: one in 1860 and a second in 1864. These experiences established Hall as a seasoned Arctic explorer and gave him valuable contacts among the Inuit. The renown he gained allowed him to convince the U.S. government to finance a third expedition: an attempt on the North Pole.

=== Finances and materials ===
In 1870, the United States Senate introduced a bill in Congress to fund an expedition to the North Pole. Hall, aided by Secretary of the Navy George M. Robeson, successfully lobbied for, and received, a $50,000 grant to command the expedition. He began recruiting personnel in late 1870.

Hall secured the United States Navy tugboat Periwinkle, a 387-ton screw-propelled steamer. At the Washington Navy Yard, the ship was fitted as a fore-topsail schooner and renamed Polaris. She was prepared for Arctic service by the addition of solid oak timber all over her hull, and the bow was sheathed in iron. A new engine was added, and one of the boilers was retrofitted to burn seal or whale oil. The ship was also outfitted with four whaleboats, 20 feet (6.1 m) long and four feet (1.2 m) wide, and a flat-bottomed scow.

During his previous Arctic expeditions, Hall came to admire the Inuit umiak—a type of open boat made of driftwood, whalebone, and walrus or seal skins—and brought a similarly constructed collapsible boat that could hold twenty people. Food packed on board consisted of tinned ham, salted beef, bread and sailor's biscuit. They intended to prevent scurvy by supplementing their diet with fresh musk ox, seal and polar bear meat.

=== Personnel ===
In July 1870, U.S. President Ulysses S. Grant appointed Hall as the expedition's overall commander, to be referred to as captain. Although he had abundant Arctic experience, Hall had no sailing experience and the title was purely honorary. In selecting officers and seamen, he relied heavily on whalers with experience in Arctic waters. This was markedly different from the polar expeditions of the British Admiralty, who tended to use naval officers and highly disciplined crews.

For his selection of sailing master, Hall first turned to Sidney O. Budington, then to George Emory Tyson. Both initially declined due to prior whaling commitments. When those commitments—Budington's first, followed by Tyson's—fell through, Hall named Budington as sailing master and Tyson as assistant navigator. Budington and Tyson had decades of experience captaining whaling vessels between the two of them. In effect, Polaris now had three captains, a fact which would weigh heavily on the fate of the expedition. To further complicate matters, Budington and Hall had quarrelled before, in 1863, during Hall's earlier search for the Franklin expedition. At the time, Budington had denied permission for Hall to bring north his Inuit guides, Ipirvik and Taqulittuq, whom had taken ill and were in Budington's care.

The remaining personnel was composed of Americans and Germans, as well as a Dane and a Swede – both of whom closely associated with the Germans. The first mate, Hubbard Chester; second mate, William Morton; second engineer, Alvin Odell; and astronomer and chaplain Richard Bryan—among others—were American. Chief scientist and surgeon Emil Bessels and chief engineer Emil Schumann were German, as were most of the seamen. Meteorologist Frederick Meyer was a German-born U.S. Army Signal Corps sergeant.

In addition to the 25 officers, crew and scientific staff, Hall brought along his native companions whose assistance he had relied on during his earlier expeditions; guide and hunter Ipirvik, interpreter and seamstress Taqulittuq, as well as their infant son. Later, at Upernavik, also joining their ranks would be Hans Hendrik, the esteemed Greenlandic Inuk hunter previously employed by Kane and Hayes on their respective expeditions, and whose expertise had been crucial to their survival, helping ward off starvation. Throwing his weight around, Hans Hendrik, wrote Bessels, "refused to see that his [wife] and their children were extremely unwelcome extras on such an undertaking." Reluctant to increase their number with "four useless mouths," Hall acquiesced so that now, besides Hans Hendrik's wife, added to their complement were three young children.

== Expedition ==
=== New York to Upernavik ===
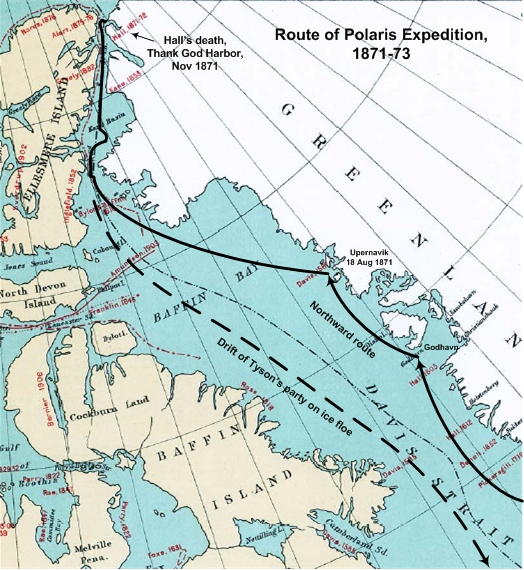
Route of the Polaris expedition, 1871–1873

Even before leaving the Brooklyn Navy Yard on June 29, 1871, the expedition ran into personnel troubles. The cook, a seaman, a fireman and assistant engineer deserted. The steward turned out to be a drunk and was left in port. The ship stopped in New London, Connecticut, to pick up a replacement assistant engineer, and left on July 3. By the time the ship reached St. John's in Newfoundland, there was dissension among the officers and scientific staff. Bessels, backed by Meyer, had openly rejected Hall's command over the scientific staff. The dissension spread to the crew, which was divided by nationality.

In his diary, Tyson wrote that by the time the expedition reached Disko Island, "[...] expressions are freely made that Hall shall not get any credit out of this expedition. Already some have made up their minds how far they will go and when they will get home again." Hall asked Captain Henry Kallock Davenport of the supply ship USS Congress to intervene. Davenport threatened to have Meyer shackled for insubordination and sent back to the United States, at which point all of the Germans threatened to quit. Hall and Davenport were forced to back down, although Davenport delivered a strongly worded speech on naval discipline to the crew.

In another open display of dissent, Polaris's boilers had been tampered with by one of the crew. The special blubber-fired boilers had disappeared, apparently thrown overboard. On August 18, the ship reached Upernavik, where they picked up Hendrik. Polaris proceeded north through Smith Sound and the Nares Strait, passing the previous furthest north by ship records held of Kane and Hayes.

=== Polar preparations and Hall's death ===
By September 2, Polaris had reached her furthest parallel north, 82° 29′ N. Tension flared again as the three leading officers could not agree on whether to proceed any further. Hall and Tyson wanted to press north, to cut down the distance they would have to travel to the Pole by dogsled. Budington did not want to further risk the ship and walked out on the discussion. In the end, Polaris sailed into Thank God Harbor on September 10 and anchored for the winter on the shore of northern Greenland.

Within a few weeks, Hall was making preparations for a sledging trip with the aim of beating Parry's furthest north record. Mistrust among the men in charge showed again when Hall told Tyson that, "I cannot trust [Budington]. I want you to go with me, but don't know how to leave him alone with the ship." There is some evidence that Budington was an alcoholic; on at least three occasions he raided the ship's stores, including the alcohol kept by the scientists for the preservation of specimens. Hall had complained about Budington's drunken behavior, and it came fully to light in the crew's testimony at the inquest following the expedition. With Tyson watching over the ship, Hall took two sleds with first mate Chester and the native guides Ipirvik and Hendrik, leaving on October 10.

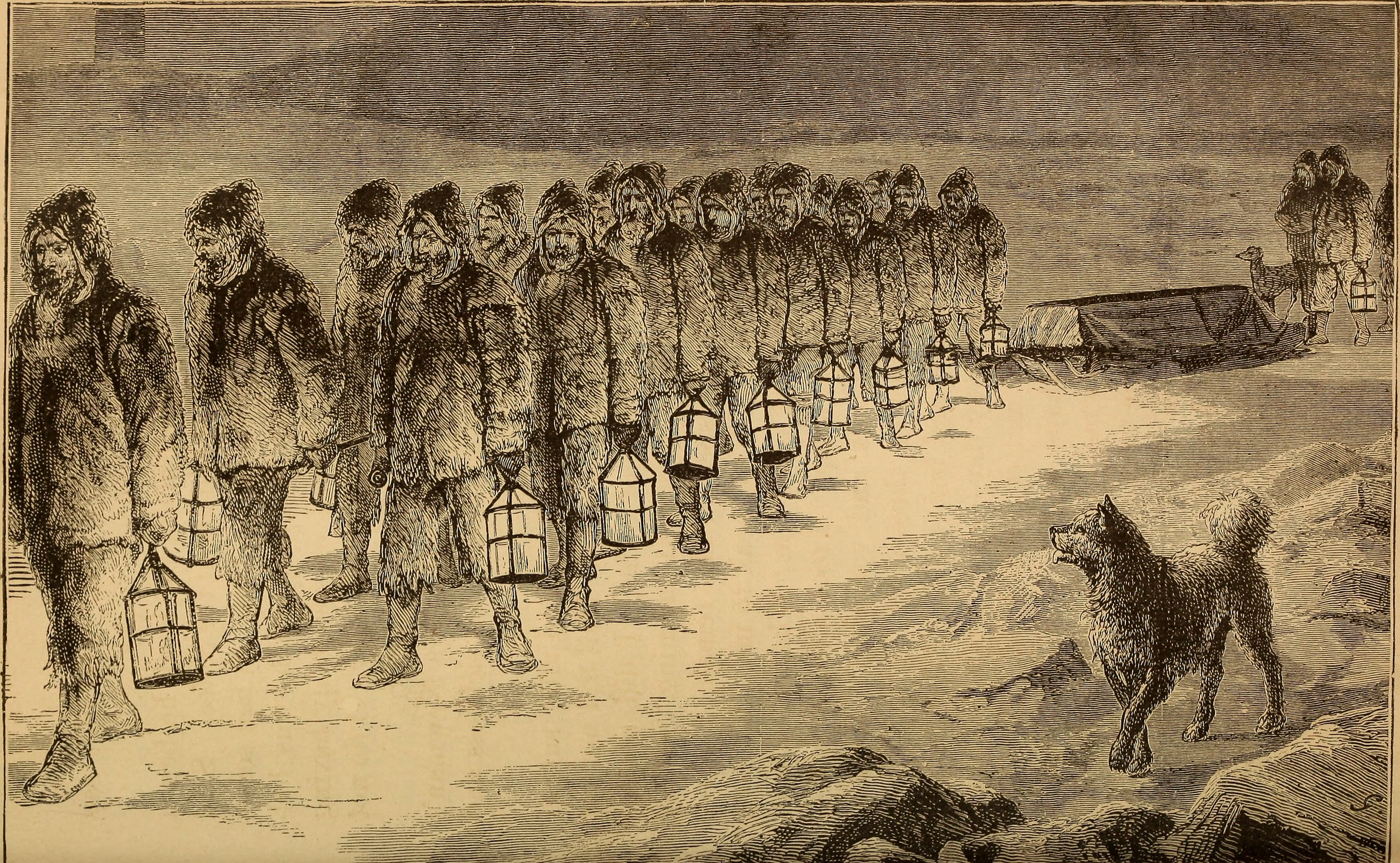
The Funeral of Captain Charles Francis Hall

The day after leaving, Hall sent Hendrik back to Polaris to retrieve some forgotten items. Hall also sent back a note to Bessels, reminding him to wind the chronometers at the right time every day. In his book Trial by Ice, Richard Parry postulated that such a note from the uneducated Hall must have rankled Bessels, who held degrees from universities in Stuttgart, Heidelberg and Jena. It was another example of Hall's micromanagement of the expedition. Before he left on the overland trip, Hall gave Budington a detailed list of instructions for the management of the ship in his absence. This likely did not sit well with a sailing master with over twenty years' of experience.

Upon their return on October 24, Hall suddenly fell ill after drinking a cup of coffee. His symptoms started with an upset stomach, then progressed to vomiting and delirium the following day. Hall accused several of the ship's company, including Bessels, of having poisoned him. Following these accusations, he refused medical treatment from Bessels and drank only liquids delivered directly by his friend Taqulittuq. Hall seemed to improve for a few days and was even able to go up on deck. Bessels had prevailed upon Bryan, the ship's chaplain, to convince Hall to allow the doctor to see him. By November 4, Hall relented and Bessels resumed treatment. Shortly thereafter, Hall's condition began to deteriorate; he again suffered vomiting and delirium, and collapsed. Bessels diagnosed apoplexy before Hall finally died on November 8. He was taken ashore and given a formal burial.

=== Attempt at the North Pole ===
According to the protocol provided by Navy Secretary Robeson, command of the expedition was turned over to Budington, under whom discipline further declined. The precious coal was being burned at a high rate: 6,334 pounds (2,873 kg) in November, which was 1,596 pounds (724 kg) more than the previous month, and close to 8,300 pounds (3,800 kg) in December. Budington was often seen drunk, but he was not the only one to pilfer the alcohol stores; according to testimony at the inquiry, Tyson was also seen "drunk like old mischief" and Schumann had gone so far as to craft a duplicate of Budington's key so that he could help himself to alcohol as well.

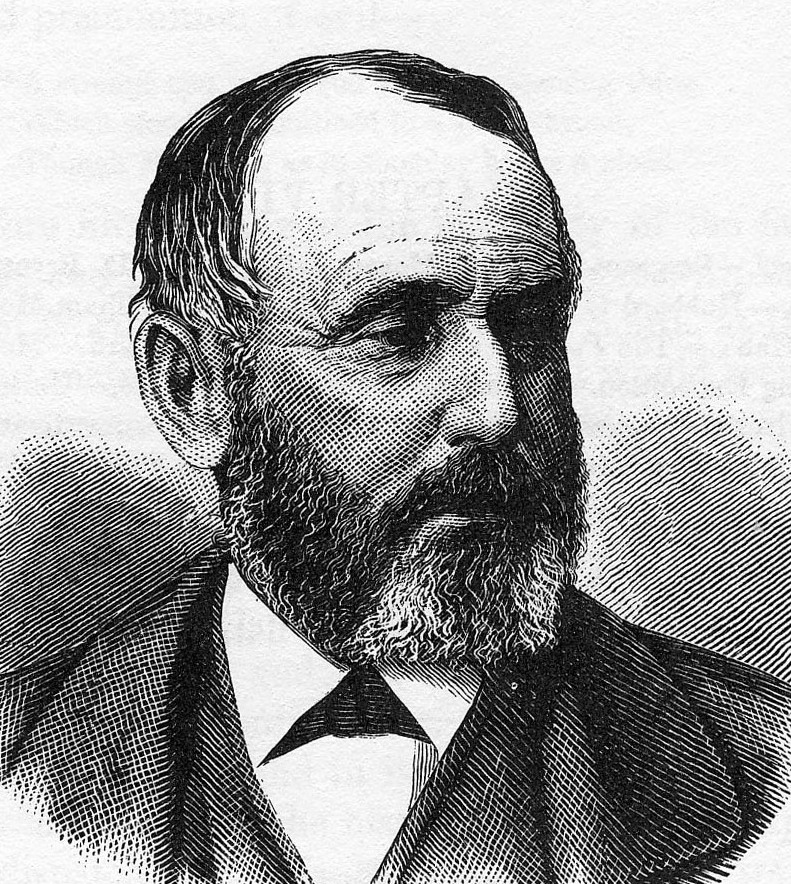
Captain Sidney O. Budington's lackluster command contributed to the gradual breakdown of discipline

Whatever the role of alcohol, it was clear that shipboard routine was breaking down; as Tyson remarked, "There is so little regularity observed. There is no stated time for putting out lights; the men are allowed to do as they please; and, consequently, they often make nights hideous by their carousing, playing cards to all hours." For purposes unknown, Budington chose to issue the ship's supply of firearms to the crew. There is some evidence of a morally questionable plan being formulated among the senior officers that winter.

On January 1, 1872, Tyson wrote in his diary: "Last month such an astonishing proposition was made to me that I have never ceased thinking of it since [...] It grew out of a discussion as to the feasibility of attempting to get farther north next summer." Furthermore, Tyson was convinced, "It is enough to make Captain Hall stir in his ice-cold grave to hear some of the talk that goes on." He revisited the subject on April 23: "Had a talk with Chester about the astounding proposition made to me in the winter. We agreed it was monstrous and must be prevented. Chester said he is determined, when he got home, to expose the matter." Writer Farley Mowat has suggested the officers were contemplating faking a journey to the Pole, or at least to a high latitude.

Whatever the unmentioned plan was, an expedition to try for the Pole was dispatched on June 6. Chester led the expedition in a whaleboat, which was crushed by pack ice within a few miles of Polaris. Chester and his men hiked back to the ship and persuaded Budington to give them the collapsible boat. With this boat and with Tyson piloting another whaleboat, the men set out to travel north again.

In the meantime, Polaris had found open water and was searching for a route south. Budington, not eager to spend another winter in the ice, sent Ipirvik north with orders for Tyson and Chester: return to the ship at once. The men were forced to abandon the boats and walk 20 miles (32 km) back to Polaris. Now three of the ship's precious lifeboats were lost, and a fourth, the small scow, would be crushed by ice in July after being carelessly left out overnight. The expedition had failed in its main objective of reaching the North Pole.

From Tyson's journal entries it appears he, Chester and Bessels were among those with the strongest inclination to keep on pushing north. Disappointed, on August 1 he wrote: "What opportunities have been lost! And the expedition is to be carried back only to report a few geographical discoveries [...] with patience we might have worked up beyond Newman Bay, and there is no telling how much farther." Exasperated by his companions' apathy and very much aware that they might never again find themselves presented with an opportunity as good as the one they were currently facing, Tyson added: "Some one will some day reach the pole, and I envy not those who have prevented Polaris having that chance."

=== Fate of Polaris and journeys home ===
With the expedition's main goal abandoned, Polaris turned south for home. In Smith Sound, west of the Humboldt Glacier, she ran aground on a shallow iceberg and could not be freed. On the night of October 15, with an iceberg threatening the ship, Schuman reported that water was coming in and the pumps could not keep up. Budington ordered cargo to be thrown onto the ice to buoy the ship. Men began throwing goods overboard, as Tyson put it, "with no care taken as to how or where these things were thrown." Much of the jettisoned cargo was lost.

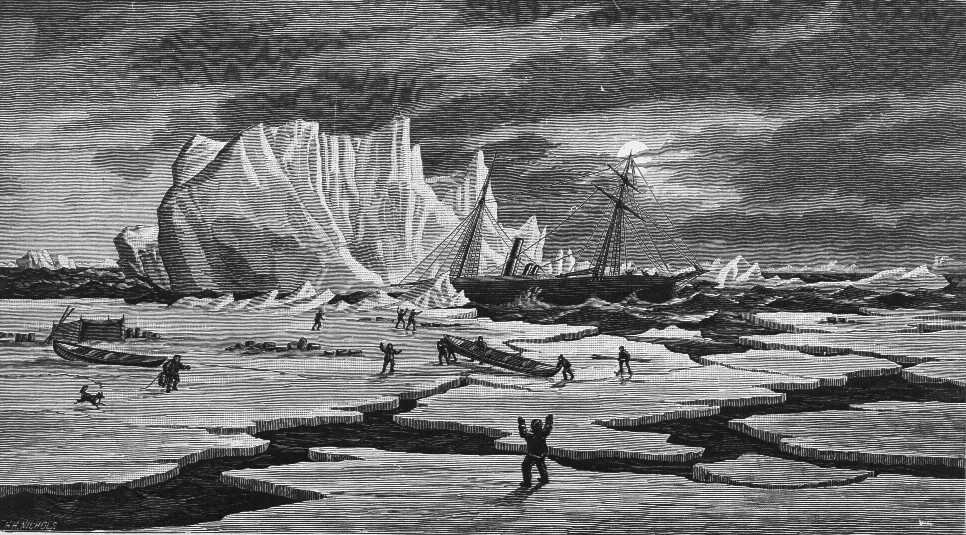
The breaking up of the ice pack

Some of the crewmen were out on the surrounding ice during the night when a break-up of the pack occurred. When morning came, the group, consisting of Tyson, Meyer, six of the seamen, the cook, the steward and all of the Inuit, found themselves stranded on an ice floe. The castaways could see Polaris eight to ten miles (13 to 16 km) away, but attempts to attract the ship's attention with a large black cloth were futile.

Resigned to the ice, the Inuit soon had igloo shelters built, and Tyson estimated that they had 1,900 pounds (860 kg) of food. They also had the ship's two whaleboats and two kayaks, although one kayak was soon lost during a breakup of the ice. Meyer reckoned that they were drifting on the Greenland side of the Davis Strait and would soon be within rowing distance of Disko Island. He was incorrect; the men were actually on the Canadian side of the strait. The error caused the men to reject Tyson's plans for conserving. The seamen soon broke up one of the whaleboats for firewood, making a safe escape to land unlikely.

One night in November 1871, the men went on an eating binge, consuming a large quantity of the food stores. The group drifted over 1,800 miles (2,900 km) on the ice floe for the next six months before being rescued off the coast of Newfoundland by the whaler Tigress on April 30, 1873. All probably would have perished had the group not included the skilled Inuit hunters Ipirvik and Hendrik, who were able to kill seal on several occasions.

On October 16, 1872, with Polaris's coal stores running low, Budington decided to run the ship aground near Etah. Having lost much of their bedding, clothing and food when it was haphazardly jettisoned from the ship on October 12, the remaining fourteen men were in poor condition to face another winter. They built a hut with lumber salvaged from Polaris, and on October 24, extinguished the ship's boilers to conserve coal. The bilge pumps stopped for good and the ship heeled over on her side, half out of the water. Fortunately, the Etah Inuit helped the men survive the winter. After wintering ashore, the crew built two boats from salvaged wood from the ship, and on June 3, 1873, the crew sailed south. They were spotted and rescued by the whaler Ravenscraig in July and returned home via Scotland.

== Aftermath ==
=== Inquiry ===
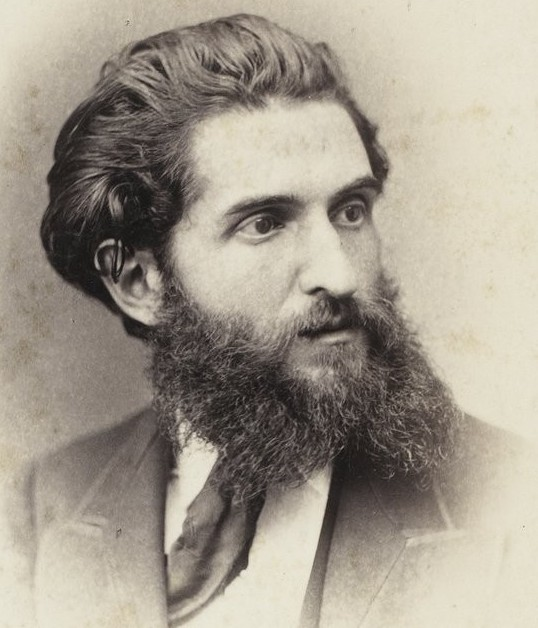
Circumstantial evidence points to Emil Bessels as the likeliest suspect of having killed Hall via arsenic poisoning

On June 5, 1873, a naval board of inquiry began. At this time, the crew and Inuit families had been rescued from the ice floe, but the fate of Budington, Bessels and the remainder of the crew was still unknown. The board consisted of Robeson, Admiral Louis M. Goldsborough, Commodore William Reynolds, Army Captain Henry W. Howgate and Spencer Fullerton Baird of the Academy of Sciences.

Tyson was the first to appear for questioning and related the friction between Hall, Budington and Bessels, and Hall's deathbed accusations of poisoning. The board also inquired about the whereabouts of Hall's journals and records. Tyson responded that while Hall was delirious, he instructed Budington to burn some of the papers, and the rest had disappeared. Later, journals of other crew members were discovered at the site of the Polaris wreck, but these had the sections regarding Hall's death cut out. Meyer testified to Budington's drinking, saying that the sailing master was "drunk most always while we were going southward".

Steward John Herron testified that he had not made the coffee that Hall had suspected of being laced with poison; he explained that the cook made the coffee and that he had not kept track of how many people had touched the cup before it was brought to Hall. After Budington and the remainder of the crew were rescued and returned to the U.S., the board of inquiry continued. Budington attacked Tyson's credibility, disputing his claim that he had obstructed Hall's efforts to sail the ship further north. He also disputed reports of his drinking, saying that he "[made] it a practice to drink but very little".

Bessels was questioned about Hall's cause of death. He stated that, "My idea of the cause of the first attack is that he had been exposed to very low temperature during the time that he was on the sledge journey. He came back and entered a warm cabin without taking off his heavy fur clothing, and then took a warm cup of coffee. And anyone knows what the consequences of that might be." Bessels also testified that Hall was "taken by hemiplegia" and his left arm and side were paralyzed, and that he had injected Hall with quinine to correct his elevated temperature before he died.

Faced with conflicting testimony, lack of official records and journals, and no body for an autopsy, no charges were laid in connection with Hall's death. In the inquiry's final report, the surgeons general of the Navy and Army wrote: "From the circumstances and symptoms detailed by him, and comparing them with the medical testimony of all the witnesses, we are conclusively of the opinion that Captain Hall died from natural causes—viz., apoplexy—and that the treatment of the case by Dr. Bessels was the best practicable under the circumstances."

=== Controversy ===
There has been speculation as to why Budington and the men aboard Polaris did not attempt a rescue of those stranded on the ice floe. Tyson was perplexed as to why the ship could not see them eight miles (13 km) distant, a group of men and supplies waving a dark-colored flag in a sea of white. The day after the storm was clear and calm, and the men on the floe could see the ship was under both steam and sail. Aboard the ship, Chester reported that he could see "provisions and stores" on a distant floe. However, there were never any orders to retrieve the stores or search for the castaways.

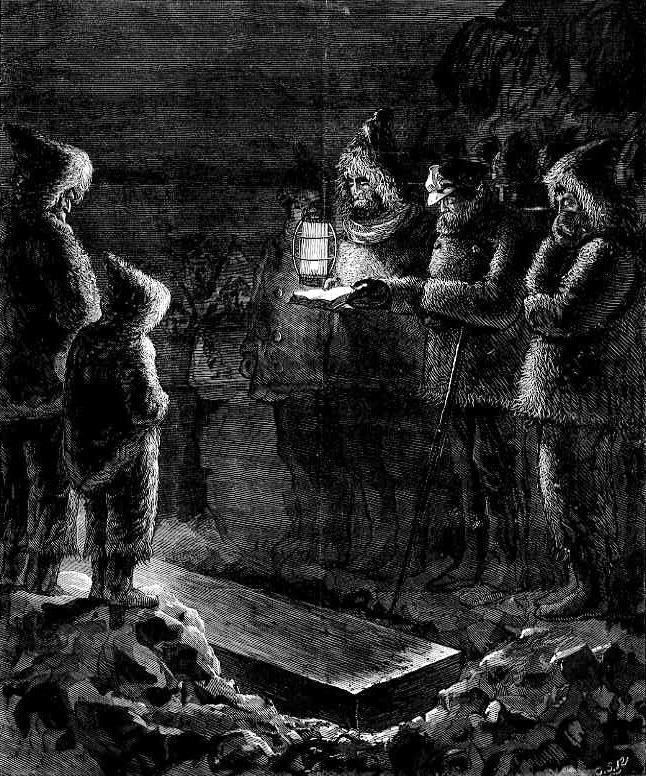
The Burial of Captain Hall

Budington's decision to beach Polaris is equally controversial. He said that he "believed the propeller was smashed and the rudder broke". The official report of the expedition states that the vessel should have been abandoned because "there was only coal enough to keep the fires alive for a few days." However, the same report states that the propeller and rudder were in fact discovered to be intact after the ship was run aground, and the ship's boiler and sails were available. Even if she ran out of coal, the ship was perfectly able to travel under sail alone. In defense of Budington's decision, when low tide exposed the ship's hull, the men found that the stem had broken completely away at the six-foot mark, taking iron sheeting and planking with it. Budington wrote in his journal that he "called the officer's attention to it, who only wondered she had kept afloat so long".

Regarding Hall's fate, the official investigation ruled that the cause of death was apoplexy. Some of his symptoms—partial paralysis, slurred speech, delirium—certainly fitted that diagnosis. Indeed, the pains that Hall complained about down one side of his body, which he attributed to many years' huddling in an igloo, may have been due to a previous minor stroke.

However, in 1968, while working on Hall's biography, Weird and Tragic Shores, Chauncey C. Loomis became sufficiently intrigued by the possibility that Hall was poisoned, and applied for a permit to visit Thank God Harbor to exhume Hall's body and perform an autopsy. Because of the permafrost, Hall's body, flag shroud, clothing and coffin were well-preserved. Tests on tissue samples of bone, fingernails and hair showed that he had received large doses of arsenic in the last two weeks of his life.

Acute arsenic poisoning appears consistent with the symptoms party members reported: stomach pains, vomiting, dehydration, stupor and mania. Arsenic can have a sweet taste, and Hall had complained that the coffee had tasted too sweet and had burned his stomach. It also appears that at least three of the crew—Budington, Meyer and Bessels—expressed relief at Hall's death and said that the expedition would be better off without him. In The Arctic Grail, Pierre Berton suggests that it is possible that Hall accidentally dosed himself with the poison, as arsenic was common in medical kits of the time.

It is considered more probable that Hall was murdered by one of the other members of the expedition; possibly Bessels, who was in near-constant attendance on Hall after he had taken sick. Furthermore, Bessels and Hall appear to have vied for the attention of sculptor Vinnie Ream – Bessels more so than Hall, the latter of whom Ream evidently preferred. While Polaris was outfitted in New York and Washington, D.C., both were known sometimes to associate with Ream. Just before their departure to the Arctic, Bessels expressed his desire to see Ream again in a letter. Envy towards Hall over Ream's affections could be seen as motive. No charges were ever filed against Bessels.

== See also ==
- List of Arctic expeditions
  - The Second Grinnell expedition of 1853–1855: set out to determine the fate of Franklin's expedition
  - The Schwatka expedition of 1878–1880: conclusively determined the fate of Franklin's expedition
  - The Jeannette expedition of 1879–1881: ill-fated attempt to reach the North Pole via the Bering Strait
