= Freemanbreen =

Glacier in Svalbard, Norway

Coordinates: 78.3443°N 21.6292°E

Freemanbreen is a glacier on Barentsøya, Svalbard. It is an offshoot of Barentsjøkulen, reaching down to the sea in the southern direction, into Freeman Strait. The glacier is named after British Alderman Ralph Freeman. The mountain of Buklerimen separates Freemanbreen from the glacier of Hübnerbreen.
