= Ipirvik =

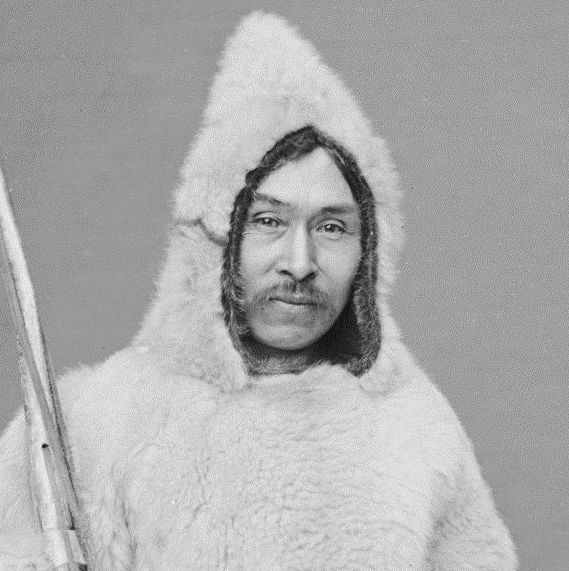
Ipirvik at the Smithsonian, c. 1873

Ipirvik (Inuktitut: ᐃᐱᕐᕕᒃ, often transliterated as Ebierbing; c. 1837–c. 1881) was an Inuk guide and explorer who assisted several Arctic explorers, among them Charles Francis Hall and Frederick Schwatka. He and his wife Taqulittuq were the best-known and most widely-travelled Inuit in the 1860s and 1870s.

== Biography ==
=== Life in England ===
The nickname "Joe" was given him by the whalers of Cumberland Sound. In 1852, one of these whalers, Thomas Bowlby, Bolby, or Bowling, took Joe and his partner Taqulittuq, known as "Hannah," and another young Inuk with him to the English whaling port of Hull. He exhibited them at several venues and always took care to let the curious know that Joe and Hannah were married and had converted to Christianity. Bowlby made arrangements for them to be received by Queen Victoria, and they apparently made a very favorable impression. Unlike many less scrupulous men, Bowlby returned all three Inuit to the Arctic safe and well.

=== Charles Francis Hall ===
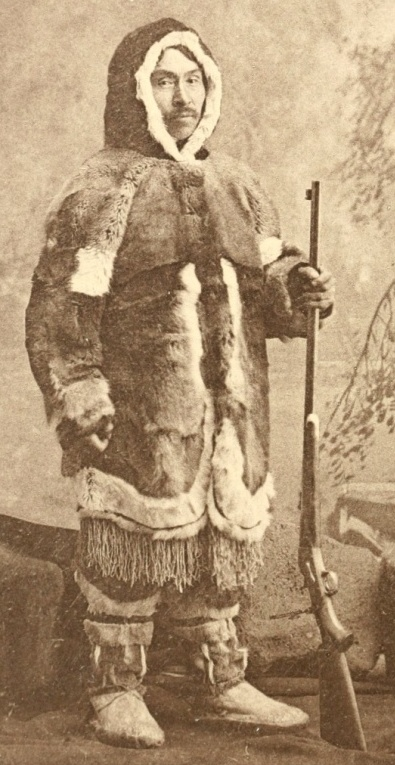
Ipirvik at an exposition

In 1860, Ipirvik and Taqulittuq met Charles Francis Hall, and worked closely with him as he sought to trace Inuit oral traditions about the 16th-century expedition of Martin Frobisher. Taqulittuq worked principally as Hall's translator, while Ipirvik served as guide and hunter. Having located the original site of Frobisher's attempted settlement, Hall returned to the United States in 1862, bringing Ipirvik, Taqulittuq and their infant son Tukerliktu along with him.

Hall had the Inuit family appear with him when he gave his talk on the Frobisher relics at the American Geographical Society, and aware of the high degree of interest in them, arranged with P. T. Barnum for their exhibition at Barnum's American Museum. Hall arranged for their exhibition shortly afterwards at the Boston Aquarial Gardens, but when no payment was forthcoming for this second exhibit, swore off any more dealings with "Show Establishments."

Nevertheless, Ipirvik and Taqulittuq, along with little Tukerliktu, appeared with Hall during his east coast lecture tour of 1863; the strain of the tour led to health problems for both "Hannah" and her son, and a few weeks later "Butterfly" was dead.

He and Taqulittuq accompanied Hall on his final voyage, the Polaris expedition, in search of the North Pole. After Hall's death, he was among the party left behind, when the ship broke loose of the ice and failed to return. During the party's six-month drift on a gradually-shrinking icefloe, Ipirvik and Hans Hendrik managed to provide food for the entire party; they were eventually picked up by a sealer in April 1873. During the investigation into Hall's death, both Ipirvik and Taqulittuq supported Hall's claim that he had been poisoned, but their evidence was discounted.

=== Later life ===
The couple returned to Groton, Connecticut, although Ipirvik returned to the Arctic periodically to work as a guide, while Taqulittuq remained behind, cared for their daughter Panik and worked as a seamstress. After Panik, whose health had been poor since her experience on the icefloe, died at the age of nine, Hannah fell into declining health. Joe was with her when she died on December 31, 1876; she was buried in the Starr Burying Ground not far from the Sidney O. Budington family plot.

Ipirvik died in the Arctic sometime in 1881; the details of his death are unknown. Joe Island is named after him – the island is located just outside to the left of Petermann Fjord off Kap Morton in Kennedy Channel. Hannah Island, in the mouth of Bessels Fjord next fjord to the south of Petermann Fjord, is named after his wife. Ipirvik and his wife were named Persons of National Historic Significance in 1981.

== Bibliography ==
- Jones, H. G. (2002). "Teaching the Explorers: Some Inuit Contributions to Arctic Discoveries". Polar Geography. 26 (1): 4–20. Bibcode:2002PolGe..26....4J. doi:10.1080/789609350. S2CID 128611222.
- Loomis, C. C. (1971). Weird and Tragic Shores: The Story of Charles Francis Hall. Lincoln: University of Nebraska Press. ISBN 9780375755255.
- Petrone, P. (1988). Northern Voices: Inuit writing in English. Toronto: University of Toronto Press. ISBN 9780802057723.
