= Frankenhalvøya =

Peninsula in Svalbard, Norway

Coordinates: 78°37′N 21°12′E

Frankenhalvøya is a peninsula at Barentsøya, Svalbard. It has a length of about nine kilometers, and a width of six kilometers. The peninsula is named after the German region of Franconia. The bay of Dorstbukta is situated between Frankenhalvøya and Besselsbreen. Northeast of the peninsula is the headland Kapp Voejkov.
