= Grimdalen =

Valley of Svalbard, Norway

Coordinates: 78°30′58″N 21°02′23″E

Grimdalen is a valley at Barentsøya, Svalbard. It extends from Barentsjøkulen to Ginevra Bay, at the eastern side of Grimheia. The river of Grima flows through the valley.
