= Mistakodden =

Headland of Barentsøya, Svalbard

Coordinates: 78.482°N 20.150°E

Mistakodden ("the mistake point") is a headland at Barentsøya, Svalbard. It is the westernmost point of Barentsøya.
