= Frederick Schwatka =

American soldier, explorer, and writer (1849–1892)

Frederick Gustavus Schwatka
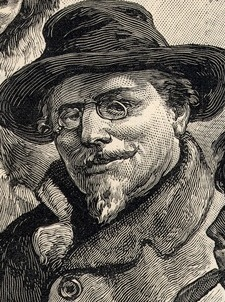
- From an 1880 engraving
- Born: 29 September 1849; Galena, Illinois
- Died: 2 November 1892 (aged 43); Portland, Oregon
- Burial place: Pioneer Cemetery, Salem, Oregon
- Military career
- Allegiance: United States
- Branch: United States Army
- Service years: 1871–1885
- Rank: Second Lieutenant
- Unit: 3rd Cavalry Regiment
- Conflicts: Great Sioux War of 1876: Battle of Slim Buttes
- Other work: Arctic exploration

Frederick Gustavus Schwatka (29 September 1849 – 2 November 1892) was a United States Army lieutenant with degrees in medicine and law, and was a noted explorer of northern Canada and Alaska.

== Early life and career ==
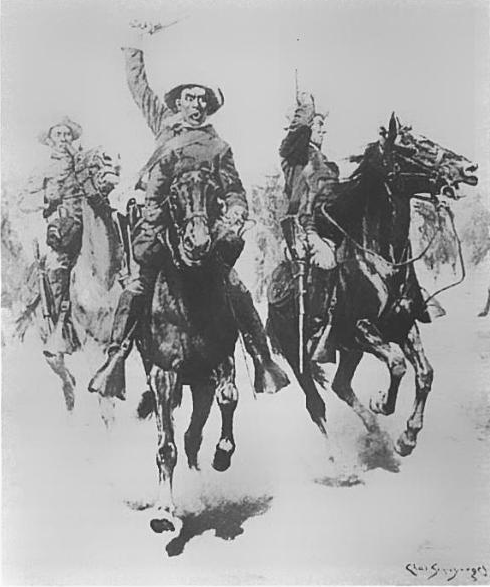
Lt Schwatka charge at Slim Buttes 1876

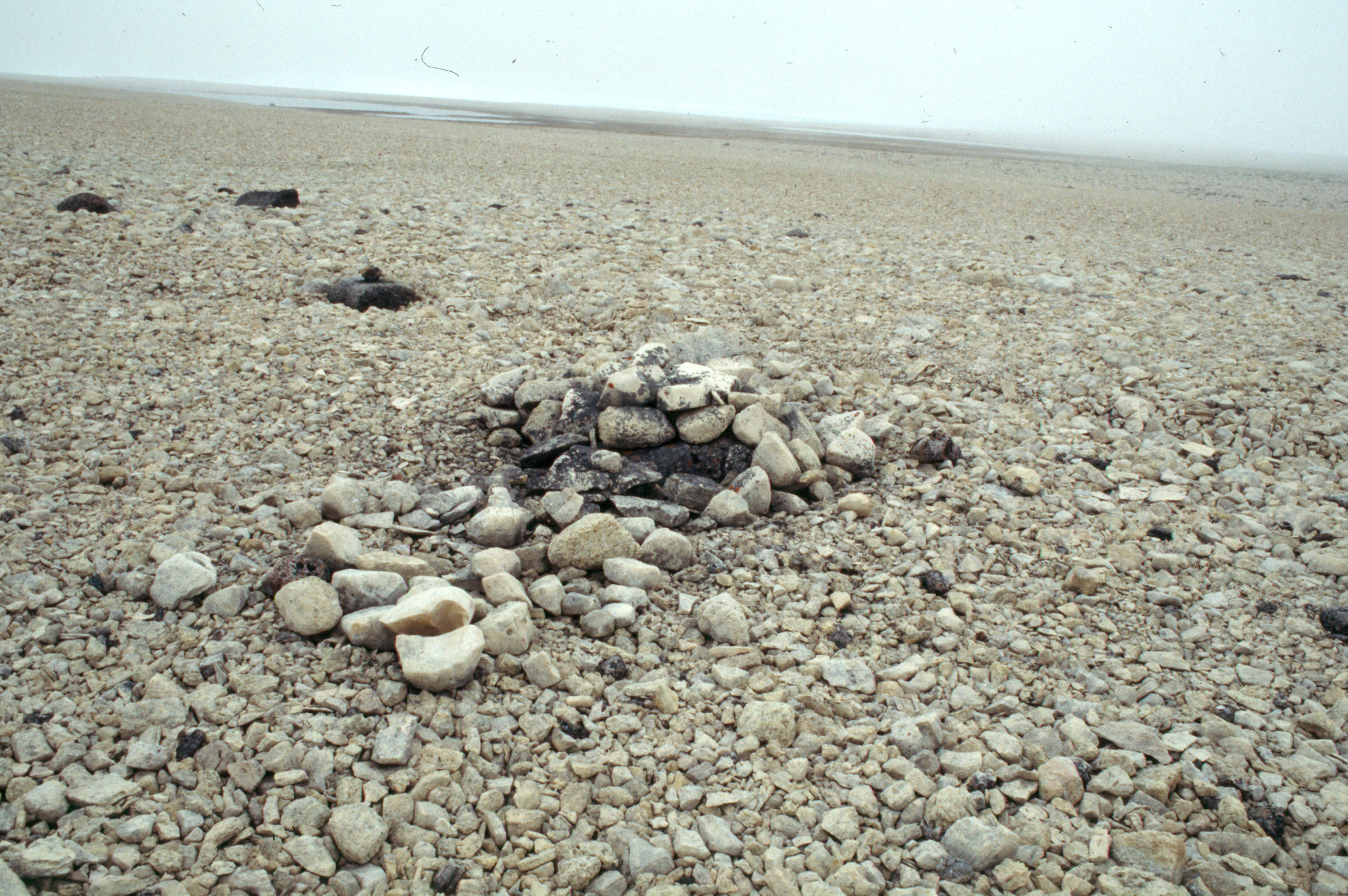
Cairn where Schwatka's note was found in 1989 at Cape Felix, King William Island

Schwatka was born in Galena, Illinois, the son of Frederick Gustavus Sr. and Amelia (Hukill) Schwatka. His father Frederick G. Sr. (1810-1888) was born in Baltimore, Maryland, the son of August and Catherine (Geissendorfer) Schwatke (the original German spelling with the same pronunciation), German Lutheran immigrants from East Prussia (now eastern Poland) and Bavaria, respectively. His mother Amelia Hukill (1812-1885) was born near Bethany, Brooke County, in present-day West Virginia and was of English and Scots descent. When he was 10 his family moved to Salem, Oregon. Schwatka later worked in Oregon as a printer's apprentice and attended Willamette University. He was appointed to the United States Military Academy at West Point in 1867 and graduated in 1871, serving as a second lieutenant in the Third Cavalry in the Dakota Territory. Studying law and medicine simultaneously, he was admitted to the Bar association of Nebraska in 1875 and received his medical degree from Bellevue Medical College in New York in the same year. In 1876, Lt. Schwatka led the initial cavalry charge at the Battle of Slim Buttes.

== Search for Franklin's expedition ==
In 1878–80, at the behest of the American Geographical Society he led an expedition to the Canadian Arctic to look for written records thought to have been left on or near King William Island by members of Franklin's lost expedition. It was supported by various New York businessmen including Henry Grinnell, James Gordon Bennett, and Charles Patrick Daly.

Traveling to Hudson Bay on the schooner Eothen, Schwatka's initial team included William Henry Gilder, his second in command; naturalist and artist Heinrich W. Klutschak; experienced seaman Frank E. Melms; and Joe Ebierbing, an Inuk interpreter and guide who had assisted explorer Charles Francis Hall in his search for Franklin between 1860 and 1869.

The party landed on Depot Island in Hudson Bay at about 16:00 on 7 August 1878. The group, assisted by other Inuit, went north from Hudson Bay "with three sledges drawn by over forty dogs, relatively few provisions, but a large quantity of arms and ammunition." They interviewed Inuit, visited known or likely sites of Franklin Expedition remains, and found a skeleton of one of the lost Franklin crewmen, identified as Lieutenant John Irving of HMS Terror. Though the expedition failed to find the hoped-for papers, in a speech at a dinner given in his honor by the American Geographical Society in 1880, Schwatka noted that his expedition had made "the longest sledge journey ever made both in regard to time and distance" of eleven months and four days and 2,709 miles (4,360 km) and that it was the first Arctic expedition on which the Caucasians relied entirely on the same diet as the Inuit. The search was conducted under some of the coldest conditions experienced in polar exploration.

== Later career ==
In 1883, he was sent to reconnoiter the Yukon River by the US Army. Going over the Chilkoot Pass, his party built rafts and floated down the Yukon River to its mouth in the Bering Sea, naming many geographic features along the way. At more than 1,300 miles (2,092 km), it was the longest raft journey that had ever been made. Schwatka's expedition alarmed the Canadian government, which sent an expedition under George Mercer Dawson to explore the Yukon in 1887. After his resignation from the army in 1885, Schwatka led two private expeditions to Alaska financed by William D. Boyce. In 1891, he was among the first non-native people to cross the Alaska Range by following the White River and crossed Skolai Pass in the Wrangell Mountains into the Copper River Basin. He also took three expeditions to northeastern Mexico and published descriptions of the social customs and the flora and fauna of these regions.

Schwatka received the Roquette Arctic Medal from the Geographical Society of Paris, and a medal from the Imperial Geographical Society of Russia. He was an honorary member of the Geographical Societies of Bremen, Geneva, and Rome.

== Works ==
Schwatka's book-length publications include Along Alaska's Great River (1885) and The Search for Franklin (1882), republished in 1965 as The Long Arctic Search.

== Death ==
He died in Portland, Oregon at the age of 43 in 1892. The New York Times reported his death as the outcome of an accidental overdose of morphine but the Coconino Sun of Coconino county (Flagstaff), Arizona listed his death as a suicide by laudanum. Schwatka was buried in Salem, Oregon.

== Legacy ==
Schwatka Lake in Whitehorse, Yukon, is named after him, as is Mount Schwatka, Alaska. In 2007, an Arctic Sharps rifle commemorating Frederick Schwatka was begun by a group of prominent American gunsmiths. Engraved by Barry Lee Hands, the rifle depicts scenes from the arctic adventures of Schwatka (See "External Links" below). Since 1960, the cruise boat the MV Schwatka has ferried passengers along the Yukon River through Miles Canyon to Schwatka Lake.

Frederick Schwatka was initiated to the Scottish Rite Freemasonry at the St. John's Lodge No. 37, Yreka, California.

== See also ==
- Ketosis Adaptation, the "Schwatka Imperative"

== Works cited ==
- Petterchak, Janice A. (2003). Lone Scout: W. D. Boyce and American Boy Scouting. Rochester, Illinois: Legacy Press. ISBN 0-9653198-7-3.
- Sandler, Martin (2006). Resolute: The Epic Search for the Northwest Passage and John Franklin, and the Discovery of the Queen's Ghost Ship. New York: Sterling Publishing Co. ISBN 978-1-4027-4085-5
- Savours, Ann (1999). The Search for the North West Passage. New York: St. Martin's Press. ISBN 0-312-22372-2
- Schwatka, Frederick (1965). The Long Arctic Search. Ed. Edouard A. Stackpole. New Bedford, Mass.: Reynolds-DeWalt
