= Hübnerbreen =

Glacier in Svalbard, Norway

Coordinates: 78.374°N 21.850°E

Hübnerbreen is a glacier at Barentsøya, Svalbard. It is located at the eastern part of the island, and is named after mining engineer and Arctic explorer Adolf Hübner. The mountain of Buklerimen separates Hübnerbreen from Freemanbreen. The coastal plain of Ritterflya, at the east coast of Barentsøya, is formed by deposits from Hübnerbreen and the nearby Reymondbreen.
