= Veslemjøsa =

Lake

- Location in Svalbard
- Location: Barentsøya, Svalbard
- Coordinates: 78°31′44″N 21°15′37″E
- Type: natural freshwater lake
- Basin countries: Norway

Veslemjøsa is a lake at Barentsøya, Svalbard. It is named after Mjøsa, the largest lake of Norway. The lake is located within the plain of Heimarka.
