= Heleysundet =

Fjord in Svalbard, Norway

Coordinates: 78°39′54.9″N 21°15′00.9″E

Tidal race in Heleysundet

Heleysundet (English: Heley Sound) is a narrow sound between Kükenthaløya and Spitsbergen. It is known for its violent tidal races.

Heleysundet was discovered (and named) by the 60-ton ship John Ellis in 1617, which had been sent out by the Muscovy Company to explore to the south-eastwards of Spitsbergen. The sound was named after the Englishman William Heley (born 1594/95), a supercargo and vice-admiral of the English whaling fleet from 1617 to 1623.
