= Krefftberget =

Mountain group in Svalbard, Norway

Coordinates: 78.27°N 20.90°E

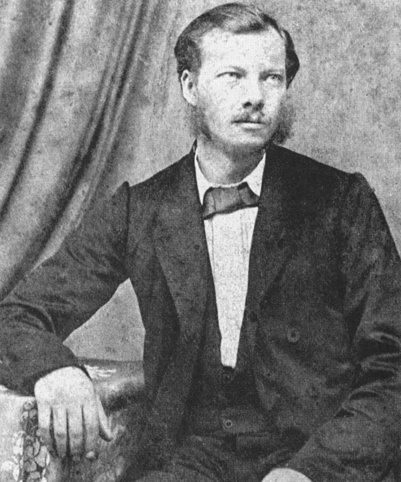
Krefftberget is named after Gerard Krefft

Krefftberget is a mountain group at Barentsøya, Svalbard. It is named after Australian zoologist Gerard Krefft, and is situated at the southern part of the island.

The hill of Helisberg is located southeast in Krefftberget, and further south is the slope of Fuglehallet, which is a nesting site for numerous birds. East of Krefftberget is the valley of Kvistdalen and the river of Kvista, and to the northeast is the mountain of Kvistdalskuven. The coastal plain of Lucerasletta extends from Krefftberget to the spit of Barkhamodden.
