= Anna Sophina Hall =

American euthanasia activist (1857–1924)

- Born: August 7, 1857; Cincinnati, Ohio, U.S.
- Died: December 17, 1924 (aged 67); Cincinnati, Ohio, U.S.
- Occupation: Activist
- Known for: Efforts to legalize euthanasia
- Father: Charles Francis Hall

Anna Sophina Hall (August 7, 1857 – December 17, 1924) was a leading figure in the movement to legalize euthanasia in the United States during the first decade of the 20th century.

== Early life ==
Hall was born in Cincinnati, Ohio, on August 7, 1857, to Arctic explorer Charles Francis Hall and Mercy A. Hall. Shortly after Hall’s birth, her father began raising funds for an expedition primarily aimed at discovering the fate of Franklin’s lost expedition; he died in 1871 during his journey. On May 21, 1874, Congress passed a bill authorizing the purchase of her father’s voyage manuscripts and approved payment of up to $15,000 to his widow.

== Activism ==
=== Background ===
Debates surrounding assisted suicide and euthanasia began in ancient Greece and Rome. After physicians began using anesthesia to relieve pain, Samuel Williams officially put forward the use of anesthetics and morphine to deliberately cause death. In 1885, the American Medical Association officially ruled that they opposed voluntary euthanasia.

=== Work ===
In 1901 Hall founded a letter-writing campaign, asking for support to propose euthanasia-related legislation after her mother’s death. The campaign attracted prominent women such as The New York Times columnist Lurana Shelton and Maud Ballington Booth, co-founder of Volunteers of America and former Salvation Army officer. Shelton aided in publicizing Hall’s efforts through publishing her own letters, while Booth dedicated time to supporting the euthanasia of incurable railroad workers. Their combined efforts helped advance the cause, drawing support from many individuals in the country.

Initially, Hall brought her campaign to the American Medical Association, who refused to acknowledge her proposal until she received two major endorsements. She then introduced her ideas publicly at the American Humane Society debate in 1905 over the euthanasia cause. After the debate, she received her two endorsements, one from Charles Eliot Norton, a Harvard literature professor, and the other from Massachusetts Attorney General Herbert Parker. She then brought her campaign to the State House in Columbus on January 24, 1906. Hall’s pro-euthanasia views were in the minority, with her proposed legislation rejected 78 to 22 votes. The legislature would later dub Hall’s legislation, in addition to a bill proposed later that year, the “chloroform bills.”

== Results ==
The debate for legalized euthanasia continued after Ohio failed to legalize the practice. Ross Hammond Gregory proposed a more extreme version of the bill in Iowa, inspired by Hall, causing increased discussion and discourse surrounding legalized euthanasia. The bill included the mandatory euthanasia of individuals who cannot be cured by physicians. The publication of the cause eventually gained the movement endorsement from the American Association of Progressive Medicine in 1917. Conversely, New York State increased restrictions on euthanasia and assisted suicide due to the publicity generated by Hall and Dr. Gregory.

Despite overwhelming changes in technology, legislation and development over the last century, arguments in opposition to euthanasia remain largely the same as they were during Hall’s time of advocacy. These arguments often include worries that interest in euthanasia would rise during economic difficulties, or emerge when doctors’ control over treatment decisions is questioned. Largely, it seems that the public interest is concerned in making assisted suicide a routine part of care.

Following the failure of Hall’s 1906 bill, it would be another 80 years until the Supreme Court would rule that assisted suicide should be left in the hands of the states.

== Personal life ==
After the death of her father and the disinheritance of her brother, Charles, Hall lived primarily with her mother, who served as head of the household. In adulthood, her mother became chronically ill with liver cancer and Hall became her sole caregiver. Nursing her mother became Hall’s main reason for her later activism in euthanasia. She later reflected, it “would have been a blessing had there been a way to relieve my mother of her suffering. Before her death I was awakened every hour of the night by her cries and prayers for death."

Following the death of Mercy Hall in 1901, Hall represented herself in court regarding the management of her mothers estate. Her brother, Charles, sued her for $15,000 which, aside from $100, her mother left entirely to Hall. She declared that she would give her mother’s money to the United States Government for scientific research.

In December, 1905 during proceedings in Judge Pflgers Court, it was declared Mercy Hall’s will –in which Hall was heiress to the $20,000 estate– was invalid, ruling it was not her final testament. The ruling entitled Charles Hall to one-half interest on the estate. Dissatisfied, Charles Hall requested a new trial. At the second hearing, Hall represented herself. The jury upheld their verdict, but the decision was later reversed by the Supreme Court, making Hall the sole beneficiary of the will.

== Death and legacy ==
Hall died on December 17, 1924, in Cincinnati. She was cremated at the Cincinnati Crematory.

Although Hall did not live to see the fruit of her hard work in real life, her legacy left an everstanding mark on the euthanasia community. As one of the first Americans to publicly share her passions regarding the legalization of euthanasia, Hall was able to lead the beginning of many movements. From lobbying and writing persuasive letters to executive members, to organizing a national campaign centered around the concept of a “merciful death”, she carved out a path for other historical figures to follow.

Drawing from her personal experiences with her mother’s sickness, her goal to find humane, dignifiable treatments to assist ill individuals was the basis of her advocacy – fulfilled through her legacy itself. She sought to find medical alternatives to end prolonged suffering, leading to her drafting a unique euthanasia bill. Ultimately, her proposal was rejected by the Ohio Legislature in 1906; however, her bill came within 54 votes of passing and acted as a major stepping stone towards sparking public discussion about legalizing euthanasia. Framing it as a social and ethical issue, her efforts legitimized conversations towards progression in the medical field.

Hall’s campaigns reached the attention of contemporary figures such as New York Times columnist Lurana Shelton and social reformer Maud Ballington Booth, both of whom supported her work and even advanced her career. Although her proposals did not achieve her preferred legislative outcome, her activism established a realm for future debates on medicinal ethics, hospice care, and alternative treatments to occur. Today, Hall’s research, activism, and accomplishments serve as an integral cornerstone work and early foundation in modern medical fields – serving as her legacy.

== Sources ==
- "Topics of the Times". The New York Times. January 25, 1906.
- Lopes, G. (2015). Dying with dignity: a legal approach to assisted death. ABC-CLIO. pp. 20–21. ISBN 9781440830983.
- Pappas, D. M. (2012). The euthanasia/assisted-suicide debate. ABC-CLIO. pp. 2–4. ISBN 9780313341878.
