= Stanley Loomis =

- Born: 21 December 1922; New York City, New York, United States
- Died: 19 December 1972 (aged 49); Paris, France
- Education: Columbia University (AB)
- Occupation: Writer
- Relatives: Chauncey C. Loomis (brother)
- Writing career
- Subject: French history
- Notable work: Paris in the Terror

Stanley Loomis (21 December 1922 – 19 December 1972) was the author of four books on French history: Du Barry (1959), Paris in the Terror (1964), A Crime of Passion (1967), and The Fatal Friendship (1972). His books have been published in eight languages and reprinted numerous times.

== Biography ==
Stanley Pennock Loomis was born in New York City in 1922, the eldest of three sons of an industrial chemist and businessman, Chauncey C. Loomis, and his wife Elizabeth (née McLanahan). He grew up in Stockbridge, Massachusetts, and attended the Lenox School in Lenox, Massachusetts.

He studied English at Columbia University, but his studies were interrupted by the war. He was trained in Japanese interpretation and served as a translator and intelligence officer in the Pacific. He was in Japan at the time of the Japanese surrender in 1945.

According to his obituary in the New York Times, his “interest in French literature began when he was a soldier in World War II. Between air raids on Okinawa, he read the 18th-century memoirs of the Duc de St. Simon.”

He returned to Columbia after the war and completed his B.A. in 1948. and obtained an additional M.A. in English. After graduating, he spent three years in France. Before settling into a writing career, he pursued a number of interests, including “working for a publisher, studying international trade in Arizona, even buying and selling a few paintings in Europe.”

A biographical note in the Saturday Review states: “He pursued his study of eighteenth-century France in much the same way his sophisticated figures lived their expensive lives: as a highly refined form of entertainment.” This “entertainment” became his life's work. He wrote his first book, a biography of Madame du Barry, mistress of Louis XV, after returning to the United States. It was published by Lippincott in 1959.

He married Virginia Lindsley Gignoux in 1960 and they had a son, Craig Putnam Loomis, in 1961. In 1965, he and his family began to spend the winter months in Paris. They lived first on the Quai Anatole France and later on the rue d’Anjou. He also spent time at the Chateau de Missery in Burgundy, a property belonging to a cousin.

In addition to his books, he wrote occasional articles and book reviews and offered tours to visiting American friends of some of the less-well-known corners of Paris and France.

He died in the American Hospital of Paris on December 19, 1972, after being hit by a motorist on the Place de la Concorde, just two days before what would have been his 50th birthday. Memorial services were held at the American Cathedral in Paris and in Stockbridge, Massachusetts. His family returned to the United States after his death.

== Books ==
Du Barry (1959): "a story told with brilliance and an admirable sense for comedy. Her later years are, fittingly enough, related in a more mellow, nostalgic key…Entertained at first, then moved, the reader, after the admirable final paragraph, is left pensive. Few books are published of which this could be said.”

Paris in the Terror (1964): “Stanley Loomis describes massacres, conspiracies and confrontations with eloquence and power. He is fascinating in his remarks about the plight of the impoverished rural nobility, 'pedigreed peasants,' about the homicidal mania of Marat and his followers, about the clash of personalities in the shadow of the guillotine. And he regularly drops wise, cynical or provocative remarks." ISBN 0-88029-401-9

A Crime of Passion (1967): “As a historian, Mr. Loomis has reconstructed for us an impeccable period piece and he has been artful, depositing his poisoned knowledge sparingly here and there, in bringing his story to a flood: the technique of 'The Turn of the Screw.'” ISBN 0-340-04474-8

The Fatal Friendship (1972): “The hallmark of his writing, in this as in his previous book on Paris during the Terror, is fairness. He never stretches a fact to suit a thesis. He never chooses among conflicting interpretations the one that will best advance his narrative … These qualities of measure and restraint contribute to the persuasiveness of his account.” ISBN 0-931933-33-1
