= Duckwitzbreen =

Glacier in Svalbard, Norway

Coordinates: 78.3472°N 20.9049°E

Duckwitzbreen is a glacier on Barentsøya, Svalbard. It is an offshoot of Barentsjøkulen, reaching down to the sea in the western direction. The glacier is named after German politician Arnold Duckwitz.
