= Freeman Strait =

Sea strait in Svalbard, Norway

Coordinates: 78°13′N 21°19′E

Freemansundet is the sound separating Barentsøya, to the north, from Edgeøya, in the Svalbard archipelago, Norway.

== Background ==
The straight is named after Alderman Ralph Freeman, who was involved in the English whaling trade in the early 17th century. The polar bear, Ursus maritimus, is a seasonal visitor to the Freemansundet; this species has a genetically distinct deme within the Barents Sea region.

== Gallery ==
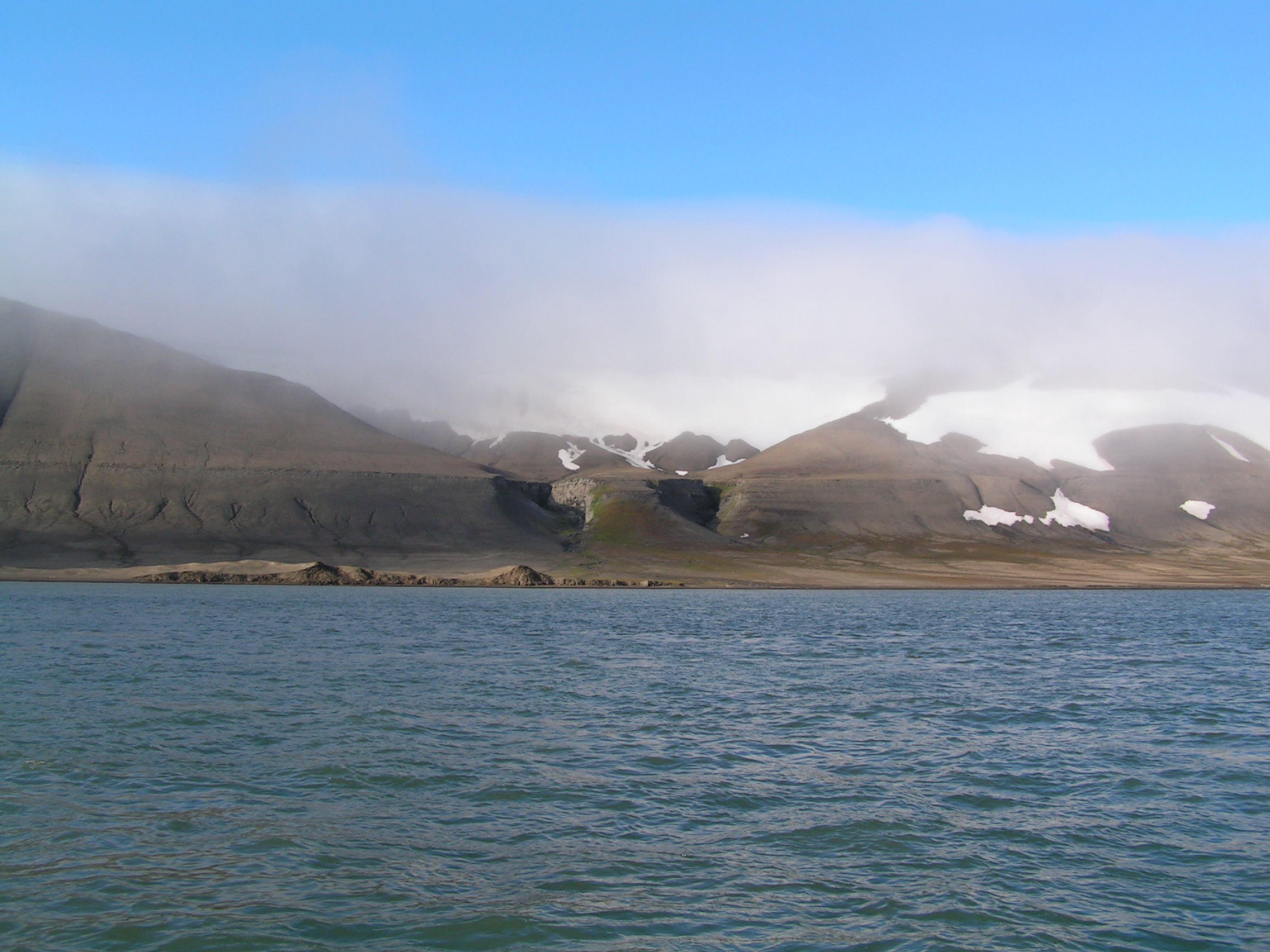
Freeman strait

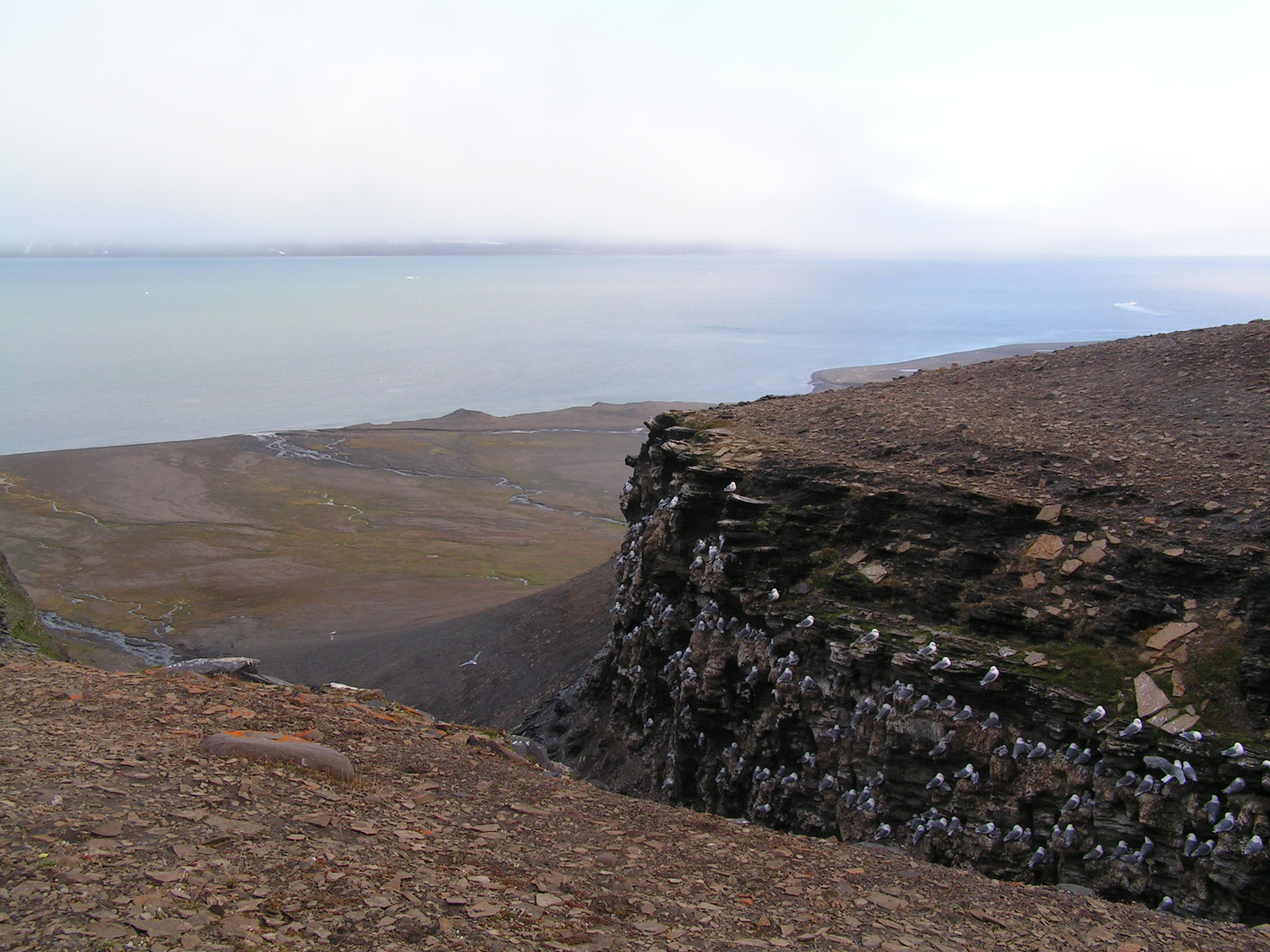
Freeman strait
