= Barentsjøkulen =

Glacier on Barentsøya, Svalbard

Coordinates: 78°25′12″N 21°30′00″E

Barentsjøkulen is a glacier on Barentsøya, Svalbard. The glacier covers an area of about 571 km^{2} (220 sq mi). It is named after the Barents Island, which again is named after Dutch explorer Willem Barentsz. Barents Island is on the Barents Sea.

The glacier has the four offshoots Besselsbreen, Willybreen, Freemanbreen and Duckwitzbreen.

== See also ==
- List of glaciers in Svalbard
