= Besselsbreen =

Glacier in Svalbard, Norway

Coordinates: 78.5239°N 21.5603°E

Besselsbreen is a glacier on Barentsøya, Svalbard. It is the largest offshoot of Barentsjøkulen, reaching down to the sea in the northeast direction, west of the point Kapp Bessels. The glacier is named after German Arctic explorer Emil Bessels.
