= Chauncey C. Loomis =

American writer

- Born: Chauncey Chester Loomis Jr. 1 June 1930; New York City, New York, US
- Died: 17 March 2009 (aged 78); Great Barrington, Massachusetts, US
- Occupation: Writer
- Relatives: Stanley Loomis (brother)
- Writing career
- Subject: Arctic history
- Notable works: Weird and Tragic Shores

Chauncey Chester Loomis Jr. (1 June 1930 – 17 March 2009) was a Dartmouth professor of English and American literature, Arctic historian, documentary maker, and author best known for Weird and Tragic Shores: The Story of Charles Francis Hall, Explorer (1971), described as “a concise and intelligent introduction to the history of Arctic exploration.”

== Biography ==
Chauncey Chester Loomis Jr. was born in New York City in 1930, the youngest of three sons of an industrial chemist and businessman, Chauncey C. Loomis, and his wife Elizabeth (née McLanahan). He was the brother of Stanley Loomis. He grew up in Stockbridge, Massachusetts, and attended Phillips Exeter Academy. He earned a B.A. from Princeton University in 1952, and an M.A. from Columbia University in 1955. He served in the U.S. Army during the Korean War before returning to teach English and American literature first at the University of Vermont and then at Dartmouth College, Hanover, where he remained from 1963 to his retirement in 1997. He served as chair of the department from 1977 to 1980. He completed his Ph.D. at Princeton in 1966.

In 1968, he led an expedition to Greenland, one of five expeditions to the Arctic he made during his lifetime. On this first trip, he received permission to disinter the body of Charles Francis Hall, a Cincinnati journalist who had made two attempts (1860–63 and 1864–69) to find the grave of Sir John Franklin, and who himself died in the course of an 1871 attempt to reach the North Pole. Rumours had suggested that Hall had not died of natural causes.

Loomis received a Smithsonian grant to go to Greenland, dig up Hall's body, take samples of the hair and fingernails, and send them for forensic analysis. Although he succeeded in doing so, the results of the analysis were not conclusive: the remains contained traces of arsenic, which could indicate poisoning, but since arsenic was a component of many medicines, it is possible that Hall had inadvertently overdosed himself.

This research expedition inspired Loomis's well-known book, Weird and Tragic Shores: The Story of Charles Francis Hall, Explorer, published by Knopf in 1971. A 2001 article by Sara Wheeler in the New York Times notes:

Chauncey Loomis [is an] accomplished writer ... and his “Weird and Tragic Shores,” recently reissued ... in the Modern Library’s Exploration Series, unravels the expedition brilliantly and also offers a concise and intelligent introduction to the history of Arctic exploration ... Loomis conjures flesh and blood from the flimsy old journals and lifts the story from the pincers of the pack ice into the warm, fathomless and infinitely more thrilling realm of the human spirit.

The book has been maintained in print by the Modern Library and was the subject of a CBC television documentary in the early 1970s. In 1981, the National Geographic Society cited the book in its Atlas of the World by marking the location of Hall's grave on its map of Greenland and noting:

A dissension-plagued U.S. expedition to the North Pole was disrupted when leader Charles Francis Hall died here in 1871. Permafrost preserved his body, which was exhumed in 1968 by Chauncey Loomis, who found that Hall had been poisoned with arsenic.

Chauncey C. Loomis wrote many essays about the Arctic, most notably “The Arctic Sublime,” which appeared in Nature and the Victorian Imagination, edited by U.C. Knoepflmacher and G.B. Tennyson (University of California Press, 1977). This article focuses on the watercolours and drawings of early Arctic explorers and their relationship to their journals and narratives. He also wrote many reviews of books about the North for the London Review of Books as well as articles about Thackeray, Joyce, Twain, and Stephen Crane for scholarly journals.

In 1996, Loomis, with art historian Constance Martin, annotated and wrote the introduction for an illustrated edition of Arctic Explorations: The Second Grinnell Expedition in Search of Sir John Franklin, 1853 by Elisha Kent Kane (R.R. Donnelley & Sons, 1996). He was a lifelong member of the Arctic Institute of North America.

Loomis was an avid fly fisherman and a keen photographer, and travelled to Peru, Kenya, and Sikkim, to photograph archeological sites, people, and wildlife. In 1964, he made a CBS documentary about muskoxen in Alaska, titled Wild River, Wild Beasts.

In retirement, he served on many boards and through the Berkshire Taconic Community Foundation established a fund to help students from Berkshire County High School attend college. After his death, the Foundation received a $2 million bequest from his estate directed to a variety of education, health, social service, art and environmental organizations.

He died of lung cancer at Fairview Hospital in Great Barrington, Massachusetts, at the age of 78.

== Selected published works ==
- Weird and Tragic Shores: The Story of Charles Francis Hall, Explorer. NY: Alfred A. Knopf, 1971, ISBN 0-394-45131-7. Translated into French as Le Robinson de la banquise, published in Paris by Paulsen, 2007.
- "The Arctic Sublime," in U.C. Knoepflmacher and G.B. Tennyson (eds.), Nature and the Victorian Imagination, Berkeley, Los Angeles and London, 1977, pp. 95–112. ISBN 0-520-03229-2
- "Arctic Profiles: Ebierbing (ca. 1837-ca. 1881)," Arctic, vol. 39, no. 2, June 1986, pp. 186–187.
- "Arctic Profiles: Charles Francis Hall (1821-1871)," Arctic, vol. 35, no. 3, Sept. 1982, pp. 442–443.

=== Edited work ===
- Kane, E.K., Arctic Explorations: The Second Grinnell Expedition in Search of Sir John Franklin, 1853, 54, 55. Edited by Chauncey Loomis and Constance Martin. Chicago: Donnelley & Sons, Lakeside Classic Series, 1996.
