= Polar Geography =

- Discipline: Polar geography
- Language: English

Publication details
- Former name(s): Polar Geography and Geology
- History: 1977–present
- Publisher: Taylor & Francis
- Frequency: Quarterly

Standard abbreviations
- ISO 4: Polar Geogr.

Indexing
- ISSN: 1088-937X (print); 1939-0513 (web)
- LCCN: 97659017
- OCLC no.: 55059927

Links
- Journal homepage; Online access; Online archive

Polar Geography is a quarterly peer-reviewed academic journal covering research on the physical and human aspects of the Polar regions of Earth. It is published by Taylor & Francis and was established in 1977. From 1980 to 1994 it was known as Polar Geography and Geology.

== History ==
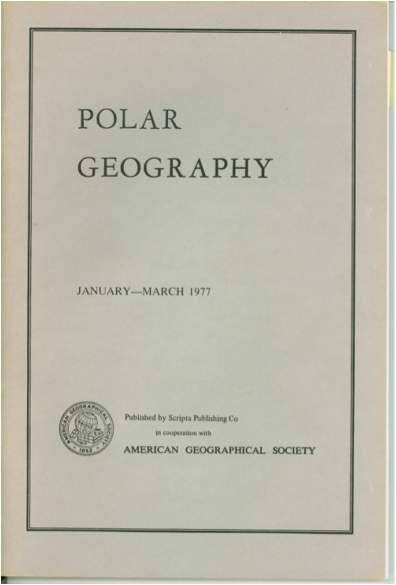
Cover of the journal in 1977

The journal was established in 1977 with the financial support of the National Science Foundation and in cooperation with the American Geographical Society "in an effort to fill part of the gap in the broad area of physical and human geography of the Arctic and Antarctic".

Founders included Theodore Shabad (Columbia University), who also became the journal's first editor-in-chief for 11 years, until his death in 1987, and Melvin G. Marcus (Arizona State University).

Originally the journal was published by Scripta Technica Inc. and later by Bellwether Publishing. It was acquired by Taylor & Francis in 2007. At its inception the journal was named Polar Geography, changed three years afterwards, in 1980, to Polar Geography and Geology. In 1995 the journal's name was changed back to the original one.

The journal's aim was to make important Soviet, Japanese, and West European research on the polar regions available in English. Subsequently, the journal's focus shifted to the north circumpolar region with emphasis on the Russian Arctic, publishing articles dealing with human as well as physical dimensions of Arctic and Subarctic environments.

=== Editors-in-chief ===
The following persons have been editor-in-chief:

- 1977 - 1979: Theodore Shabad, (Columbia University)
- 1980 - 1983: Theodore Shabad and John T. Andrews (University of Colorado)
- 1983 - 1988: Theodore Shabad, William Barr (University of Saskatchewan)
- 1988 - 1993: William Barr, Harley J. Walker (Louisiana State University)
- 1994 (Vol 18, Issue 1): William Barr, Roger G. Barry (University of Colorado), Harley J. Walker
- 1994: Roger G. Barry, Harley J. Walker
- 1995 - 1998: Harald Finkler (Department of Indian Affairs and Northern Development, Canada), Gail Fondhal, Kevin Hall, Greg Poelzer (latter three: University of Northern British Columbia)
- 1999 (Volume 23, Issue 1): Kees van der Veen (Byrd Polar Research Center, Ohio State University)
- 1999 (Volume 23, Issue 2): Harald Finkler, Gail Fondhal, Kevin Hall, Greg Poelzer
- 1999 - 2005: Kees van der Veen
- 2006: (No issues published)
- 2007 - 2008: David R. Yesner (University of Alaska Anchorage)
- 2009 - 2011: Mark Carper (Northeastern State University)
- 2012 - 2015t: Tim Heleniak (Department of Geography, George Washington University)
- 2016 - present: Jessica Graybill (Department of Geography and Russian and Eurasian Studies Program, Colgate University)

== Abstracting and indexing ==
The journal is abstracted and indexed in ProQuest.
