= Charles Francis Hall =

American explorer of the Arctic (c. 1821 – 1871)

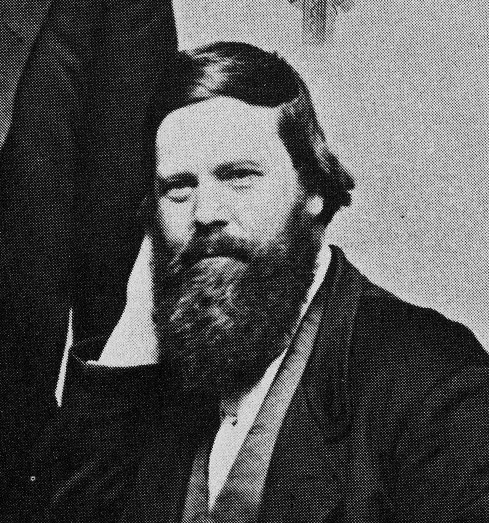
- The only known photograph of Hall, late 1870
- Born: Unknown date, c. 1821; Rochester, New Hampshire, U.S.
- Died: November 8, 1871 (aged 50); Thank God Harbor, Greenland
- Cause of death: Apoplexy (official ruling); Arsenic poisoning (suspected)
- Occupations: Explorer; author; publisher; engraver; blacksmith
- Years active: 1860–1871 (as explorer)
- Known for: Death during Polaris expedition
- Notable work: Life with the Esquimaux (1865)
- Children: Anna Sophina Hall

Charles Francis Hall (c. 1821 – November 8, 1871) was an American Arctic explorer, best known for his collection of Inuit testimony regarding the 1845 Franklin Expedition and the suspicious circumstances surrounding his death while leading the American-sponsored Polaris expedition in an attempt to be the first to reach the North Pole. The expedition was marred by insubordination, incompetence, and poor leadership.

Hall returned to the ship from an exploratory sledging journey, and promptly fell ill. Before he died, he accused members of the crew—the expedition's lead scientist, Emil Bessels, in particular—of having poisoned him. An exhumation of his body in 1968 revealed that he had ingested a large quantity of arsenic in the last two weeks of his life.

== Early life ==
Little is known of Hall's early life. He was born either in Rochester, New Hampshire, or in the state of Vermont before moving to Rochester at a young age, where he was apprenticed to a blacksmith at a young age.

In the 1840s, he married and drifted westward, arriving in Cincinnati in 1849, where he went into business making seals and engraving plates. He later published his own newspaper; the Cincinnati Occasional, later renamed the Daily Press.

== Arctic exploration ==
=== First expedition (1860-1862) ===
Around 1857, Hall became interested in the Arctic and spent the next few years studying the reports of previous explorers and trying to raise money for an expedition, intended primarily to learn the fate of Franklin's lost expedition.

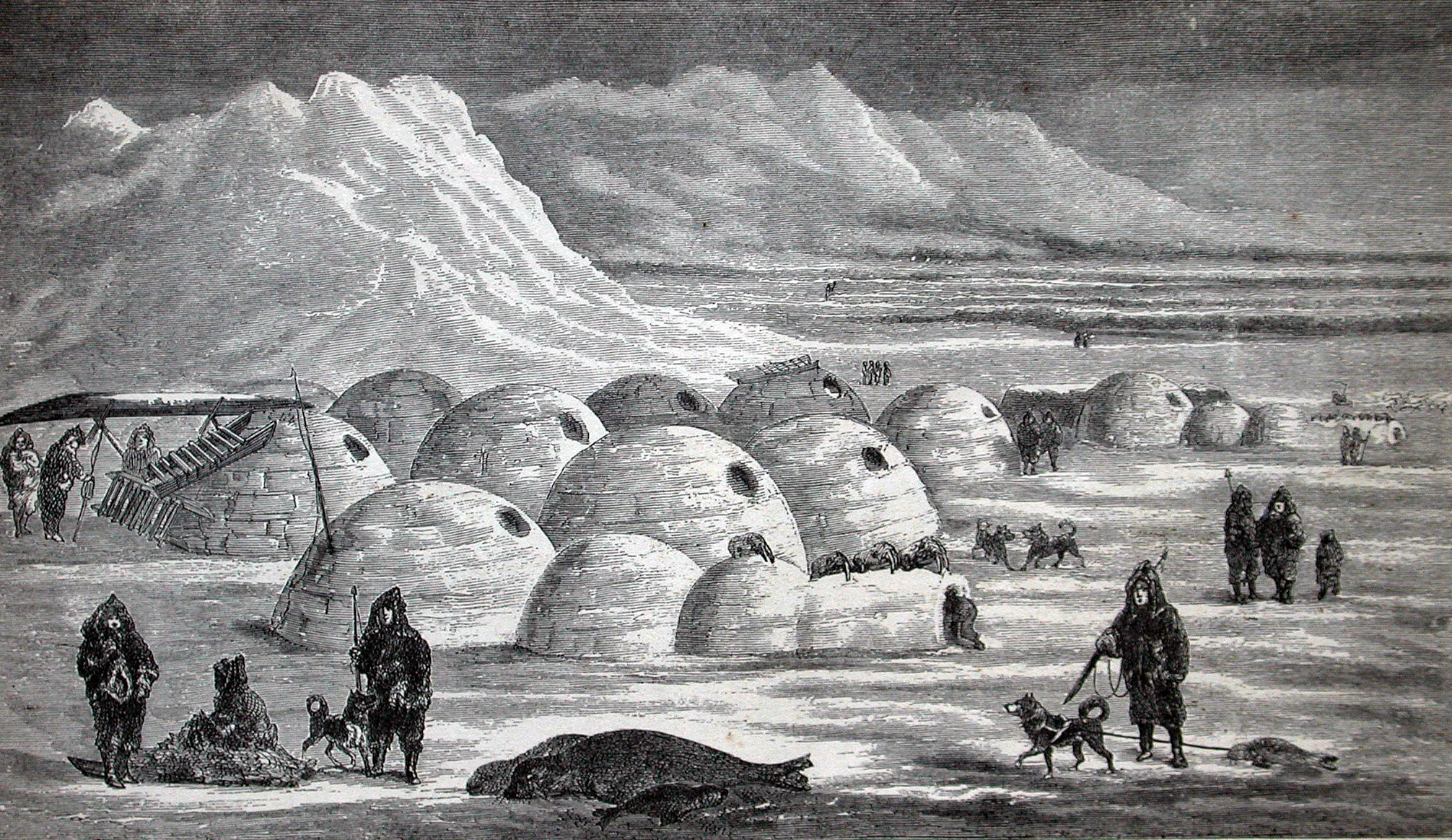
"Inuit village near Frobisher Bay," Life with the Esquimaux: A Narrative of Arctic Experience (1865)

Hall went on his first expedition by gaining passage on the George Henry, a whaler commanded by Captain Sidney O. Budington out of New Bedford. They got as far as Baffin Island, where the George Henry was forced to spend the winter. Local Inuit told Hall about relics of Martin Frobisher's mining venture at Frobisher Bay, to which Hall traveled to inspect these items. He was assisted by his newly recruited Inuit guides, husband and wife Ipirvik and Taqulittuq.

Hall also found what he took to be evidence that some members of Franklin's lost expedition were still alive. On his return to New York, Hall arranged for the Harper Brothers to publish his account of the expedition: Arctic Researches and Life Among the Esquimaux. It was edited by William Parker Snow, equally obsessed by Franklin's fate. The two eventually came to a disagreement, owing mostly to Snow's slow editing. Snow later claimed that Hall had used his ideas for the search for Franklin without giving him due credit.

=== Second expedition (1863-1869) ===
Over the course of 1863, Hall planned a second expedition to seek more clues on the fate of Franklin, including efforts to find any of the rumoured survivors or their written records. The first attempt, using the 95-ton schooner, USRC Active, was abandoned, probably owing to lack of finances caused by the American Civil War and a troubled relationship with his intended second-in-command, William Parker Snow. Finally, in July 1864, a much smaller expedition departed in the whaler Monticello.

During this second expedition to King William Island, Hall found remains and artifacts from the Franklin expedition, and made more inquiries about their fate from natives living there. Hall eventually came to believe that the stories of survivors were unreliable, either by the Inuit or his own readiness to give them overly optimistic interpretations.

On July 31, 1868, while in Repulse Bay, Hall shot Patrick Coleman, a whaler in his party, claiming that Coleman, himself unarmed, was attempting mutiny. Other whalers in the party claimed the attack occurred because Hall was angry that Coleman was interviewing local Inuit without his permission. Coleman died two weeks after being shot, during which Hall expressed remorse and tried to heal him. Hall was never tried for Coleman's murder: the Canadian government considered it under American jurisdiction and the American government entirely ignored the matter. Two days after Coleman's death, the whaling ships Ansel Gibbs and Concordia arrived in Repulse Bay. The remaining four whalers deserted to these ships while Hall stayed with the Inuit.

=== Polaris expedition (1871-1873) ===
Hall's third expedition was of an entirely different character. He received a grant of $50,000 from the U.S. Congress to command an expedition to the North Pole on the USS Polaris. The party of 25 also included Hall's old friend Budington as sailing master, George Tyson as navigator, and Emil Bessels as physician and chief of scientific staff. The expedition was troubled from the start as the party split into rival factions. Hall's authority over the expedition was resented by a large portion of the party, and discipline broke down.

==== Death ====
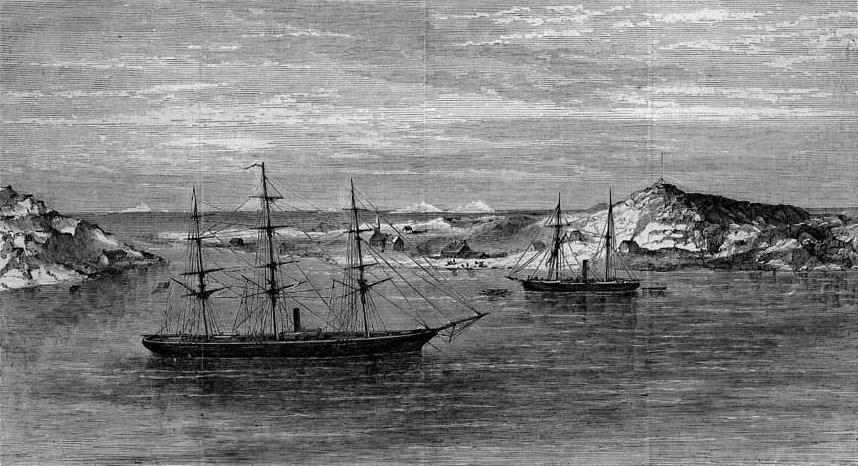
Polaris (right) and Congress at Disko Island

Polaris sailed into Thank God Harbor—present-day Hall Bay—on September 10, 1871, and anchored for the winter on the shore of northern Greenland. That fall, upon returning to the ship from a sledging expedition with an Inuk guide to a fjord which he named Newman Bay, Hall suddenly fell ill after drinking a cup of coffee. He collapsed in what was described as a fit. For the next week he suffered from vomiting and delirium, then seemed to improve for a few days. At that time, he accused several of the ship's company, including Bessels, of having poisoned him. Shortly thereafter, Hall died on November 8. Hall was taken ashore and given a formal burial.

Command of the expedition devolved on Budington, who reorganized to try for the Pole in June 1872. This was unsuccessful and Polaris turned south. On October 12, the ship was beset by ice in Smith Sound and was on the verge of being crushed. Nineteen of the crew and the Inuit guides abandoned ship for the surrounding ice while 14 remained aboard. Polaris was run aground near Etah and crushed on October 24. After wintering ashore, the crew sailed south in two boats and were rescued by a whaler, returning home via Scotland.

The following year, the remainder of the party attempted to extricate Polaris from the pack and head south. A group, including Tyson, became separated as the pack broke up violently and threatened to crush the ship in the fall of 1872. The group of 19 drifted over 1,500 miles (2,400 km) on an ice floe for the next six months, before being rescued off the coast of Newfoundland by the sealer Tigress on April 30, 1873, and probably would have all perished had the group not included several Inuit who were able to hunt for the party.

==== Investigation ====
The official investigation that followed ruled that Hall had died from apoplexy. However, in 1968, Hall's biographer, Chauncey C. Loomis, a professor at Dartmouth College, made an expedition to Greenland to exhume Hall's body. To the benefit of the professor, permafrost had preserved the body, flag shroud, clothing, and coffin. Tests on tissue samples of bone, fingernails and hair showed that Hall died of poisoning from large doses of arsenic in the last two weeks of his life.

This diagnosis is consistent with the symptoms party members reported. It is possible that Hall treated himself with the poison, as arsenic was a common ingredient of quack medicines of the time. Loomis considered it possible that he was murdered by one of the other members of the expedition, possibly Bessels, though no charges were ever filed. Most recently, the emergence of affectionate letters written by both Hall and Bessels to Vinnie Ream, a young sculptor they both met in New York while waiting for the Polaris to be outfitted, suggests a possible motive for Bessels to eliminate Hall.
