= USS Polaris (1871) =

Gunboat of the United States Navy

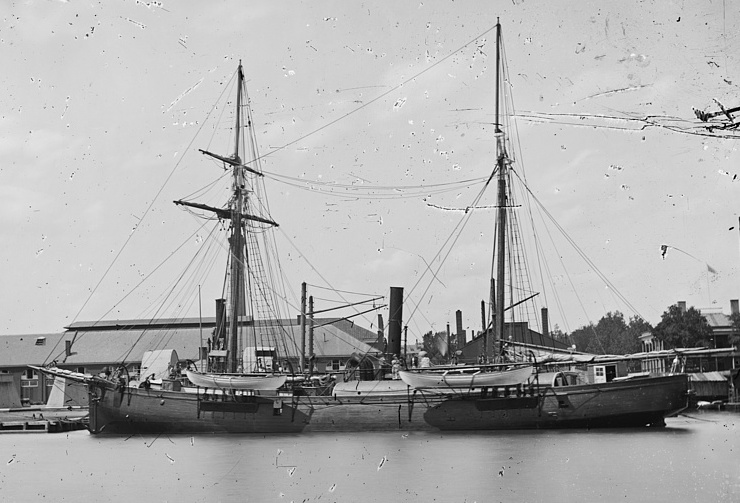
- Polaris at Washington Navy Yard

History

United States
- Name: USS Periwinkle
- Operator: Union Navy
- Acquired: December 9, 1864
- Commissioned: January 15, 1865
- Home port: Norfolk Navy Yard

History
- Name: USS Polaris
- Namesake: Alpha Ursae Minoris
- Operator: Hall scientific expedition
- Acquired: June 9, 1871
- Commissioned: June 29, 1871
- Home port: Washington Navy Yard
- Sunk: October 24, 1872, off Etah

General characteristics (1864)
- Type: Screw steamer
- Displacement: 383 tons
- Length: 140 feet (43 meters)
- Beam: 28 feet (9 meters)
- Draft: 10 1/2 feet (3 meters)
- Depth of hold: 12 feet (4 meters)
- Sail plan: Two-mast schooner rig
- Complement: 37 officers and men

USS Polaris, originally called the America, was an 1864 screw steamer procured by the Union Navy as USS Periwinkle during the final months of the American Civil War. She served the Union Navy's struggle against the Confederate States as a gunboat.

After the war, the ship was retained by the U.S. Navy. She was renamed Polaris in 1871 and became the designated vessel of the Hall scientific expedition to the North Pole. It was on this voyage that she proceeded into Arctic waters, only to have her hull crushed by the ice in October 1872.

== Construction ==
America, a heavy screw tugboat built at Philadelphia, in 1864, was purchased by the Union Navy December 9, 1864, from John W. Lynn; renamed Periwinkle; and commissioned early in January 1865, acting Master Henry C. Macy in command.

== Potomac Flotilla ==
The two-masted, schooner-rigged, white oak tug joined the Potomac Flotilla on January 15, 1865, as a gunboat, operating primarily in the Rappahannock River.

In mid-March, a fleet of oyster schooners operating in the area was threatened by a Confederate enemy force, and Periwinkle with USS Morse, blockaded the mouths of the Rappahannock and Piankatank rivers to protect them. The Flotilla also interrupted contraband business between lower Maryland and Virginia, and cleared the rivers of mines, and fought guerillas ashore.

After the Civil War ended, Periwinkle continued to serve with the flotilla until June 1865. Next, ordered to Norfolk, Virginia, she operated out of the Norfolk Navy Yard until placed in ordinary during 1867.

== Furthest North ==
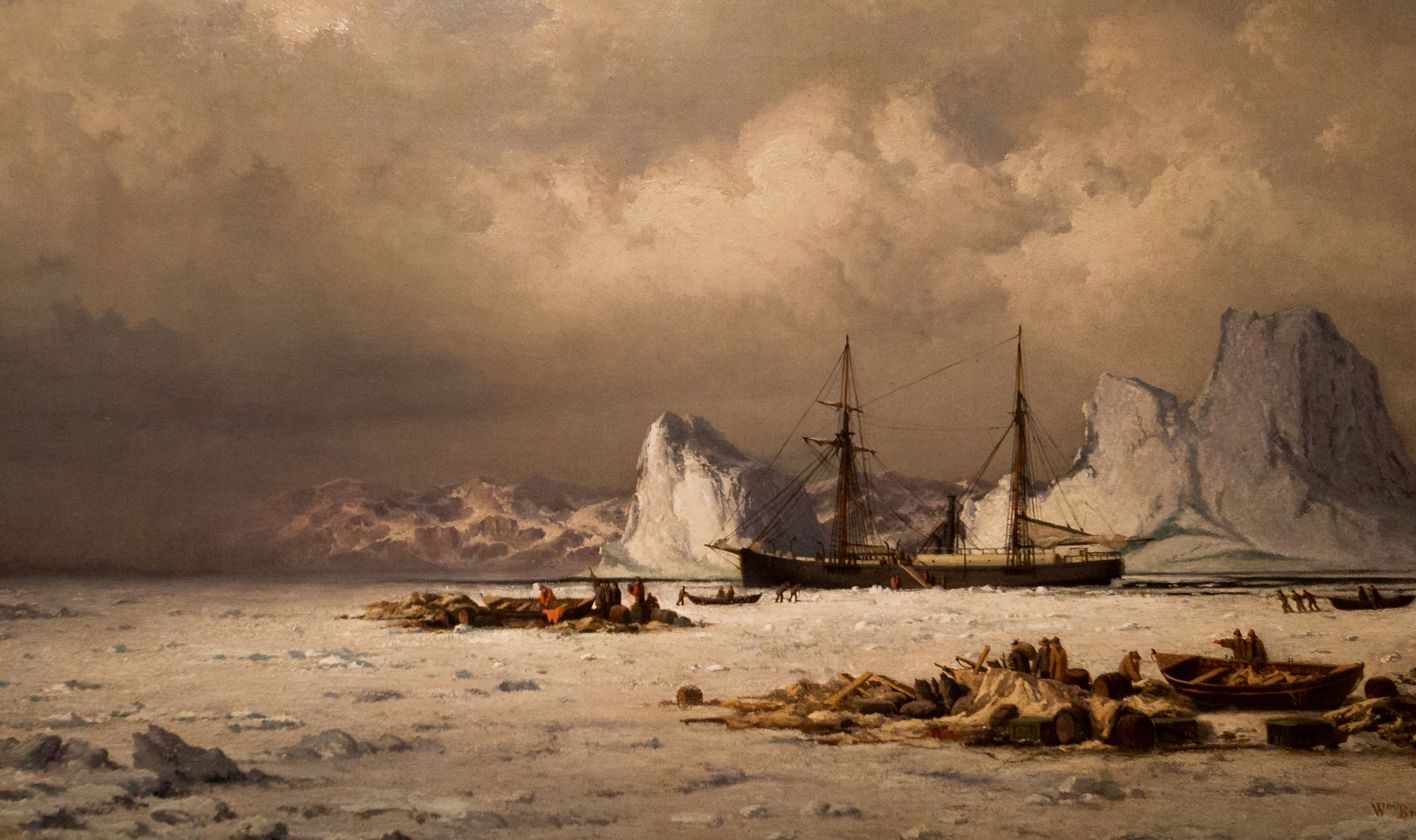
The Polaris, Far North (1882), by William Bradford

In late 1870, she was selected for service with the Hall scientific expedition, led by Charles Francis Hall, and was sent to the Washington Navy Yard for refitting. Renamed USS Polaris in early-1871, she arrived at the New York Navy Yard on June 9 to complete loading of stores and provisions for the expedition. She set sail in July 1871.

Aiming for the North Pole, she reached 82° 29′N latitude, then the furthest point north reached by a vessel. Polaris was caught in the ice on the homeward voyage in October 1872, and carried for some distance before being crushed. Her crew was subsequently rescued, including a party of 18 people led by George Emory Tyson, who had debarked to land provisions after the hull of the Polaris had begun to leak, only to have the section of the ice floe they were on break away from the section holding the Polaris. The lost party, which included five young children, including an Inuit baby born on the ice floe, floated for 196 days through the Davis Strait, travelling more than 1,000 miles (1,600 km) before being rescued at Grady Harbour, Labrador.
