= Ginevra Bay =

Fjord in Svalbard, Norway

Coordinates: 78°34′55″N 20°20′43″E

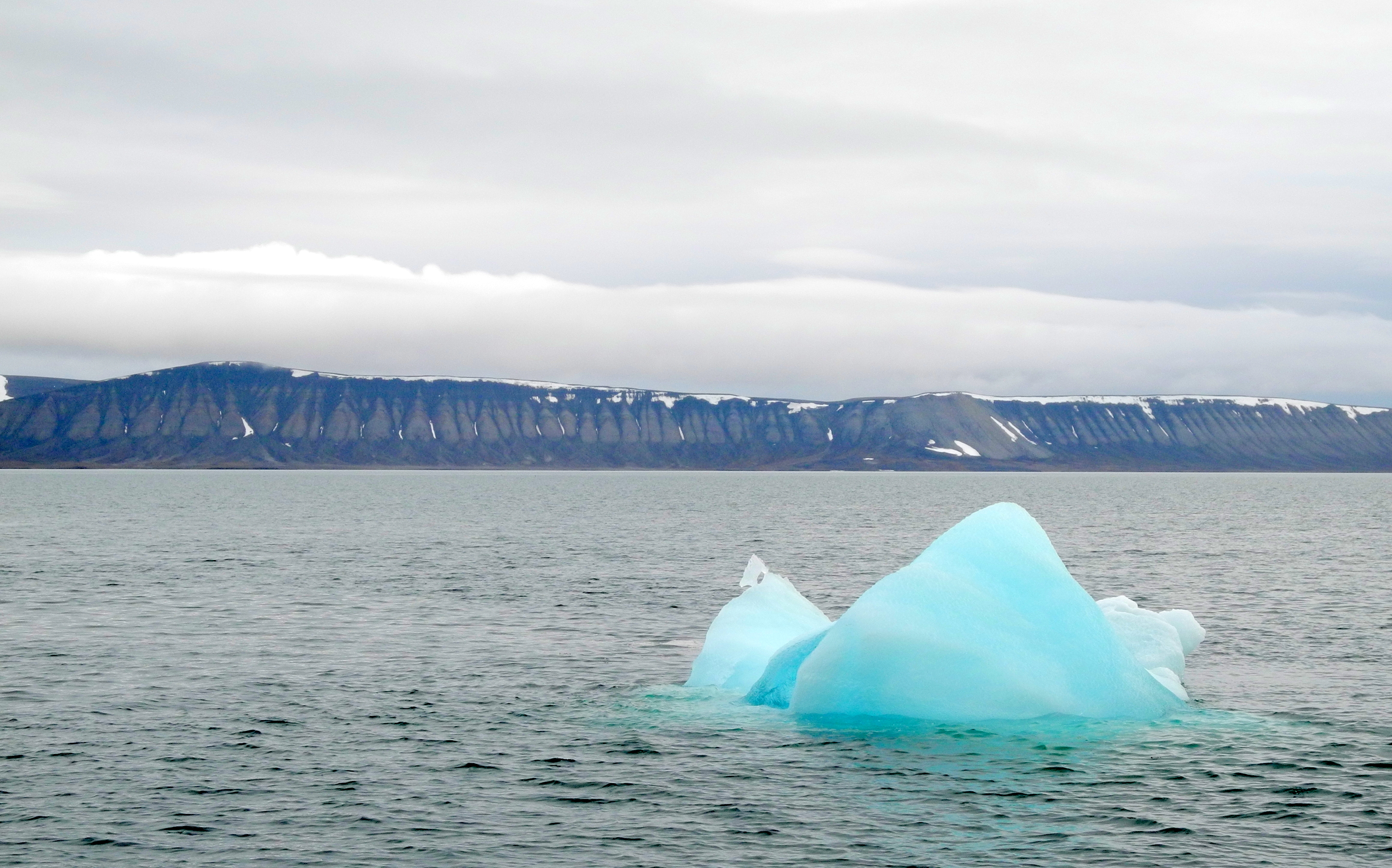
Ginevra Bay, the northern part of Storfjorden

Ginevra Bay (Norwegian: Ginevrabotnen) is the inner part of Storfjorden, Svalbard, between Barentsøya and Spitsbergen. It is named after James Lamont's vessel Ginevra.
