= Barentsøya =

Island in the Svalbard archipelago, Norway

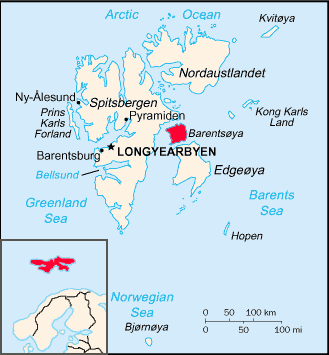
- Interactive map of Barentsøya

Geography
- Location: Arctic Ocean
- Coordinates: 78°25′N 21°27′E
- Archipelago: Svalbard
- Area: 1,288 km^{2} (497 sq mi); 558 km^{2} (215 sq mi) glaciated.
- Coastline: 205 km (127.4 mi)
- Highest elevation: 666 m (2185 ft)
- Highest point: Solveigdomen

Administration
- Norway

Demographics
- Population: 0

Barentsøya, anglicized as Barents Island, is an Arctic island in the Svalbard archipelago of Norway, lying between Edgeøya and Spitsbergen. To the north, in the sound between Barentsøya and Spitsbergen, lies the island of Kükenthaløya. To the south, the sound separating Barents Island from Edgeøya is Freemansundet.

Barentsøya has no permanent human inhabitants. It is part of the Søraust-Svalbard Nature Reserve and forms a habitat for several species, including polar bears and kittiwakes.

== History ==
The island was named after Dutch explorer Willem Barents who, despite discovering Svalbard, never sighted Barentsøya itself. The name "Barents Land" was only given after an 1865 Swedish expedition. Previously, Dutch whaling captains had referred to it on maps as Zuyd Ooster Land ("Southeastern Land") as early as 1710.

In 1936, Norway built four cabins on the island to formally establish control.

== Geography ==
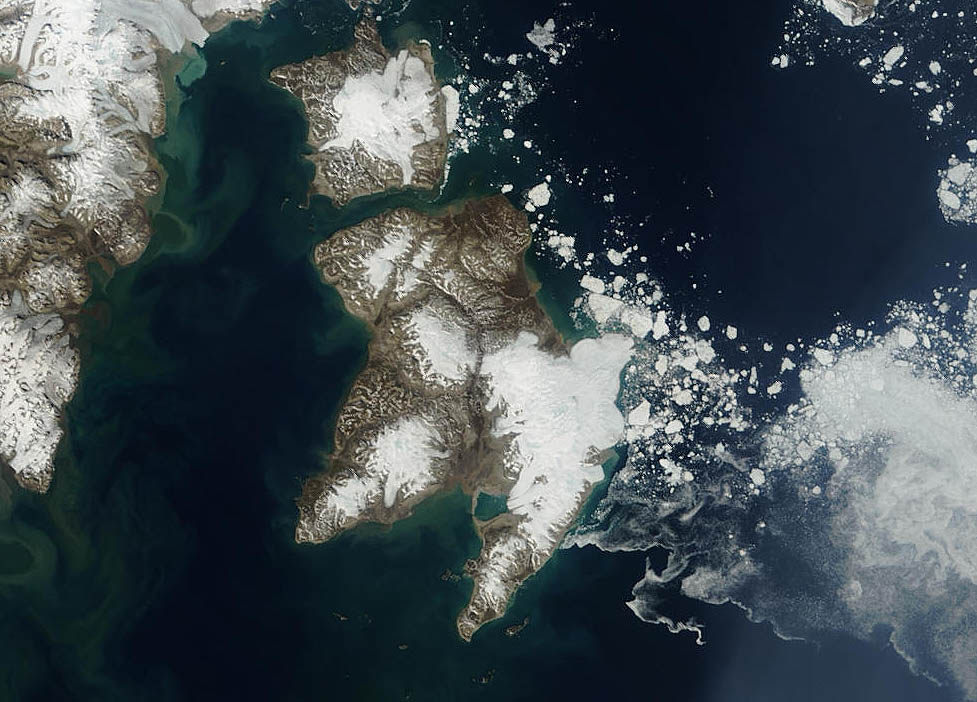
July NASA 2002 satellite photograph of Edgeoya and Barentsøya

Barentsøya has an approximately square shape, with maximum lengths and widths of about fifty kilometers, and an area of 1,288 km^{2} (497 sq mi). A significant part of the island, more than 500 km^{2} (190 sq mi), is glaciated. The ice cap of Barentsjøkulen covers a large part of the island, with the largest offspring Besselsbreen (north), Duckwitzbreen (west), Freemanbreen (south), and Hübnerbreen (southeast). Barentsjøkulen has the two large ice domes of Peer Gyntslottet and Solveigdomen. The mountain of Schweinfurthberget is a nunatak of Barentsjøkulen. It has a height of 590 m.a.s.l., is the highest mountain of Barentsøya, and is named after German scientist Georg August Schweinfurth.

At the northern side of Barentsøya is the ice-free peninsula of Frankenhalvøya, between Ginevra Bay at the western side and Dorstbukta to the east. Grimheia is an ice-free mountainous area extending over a length of about thirteen kilometers at the northern part of the island. The westernmost point of the island is the headland of Mistakodden. At the southern part of Barentsøya are the mountains of Krefftberget and Høgrinden, while Jeppeberget is located to the southeast. The largest lakes of the island are Veslemjøsa in Heimarka, and Dalskilvatnet between the valleys of Sjodalen and Grimdalen.

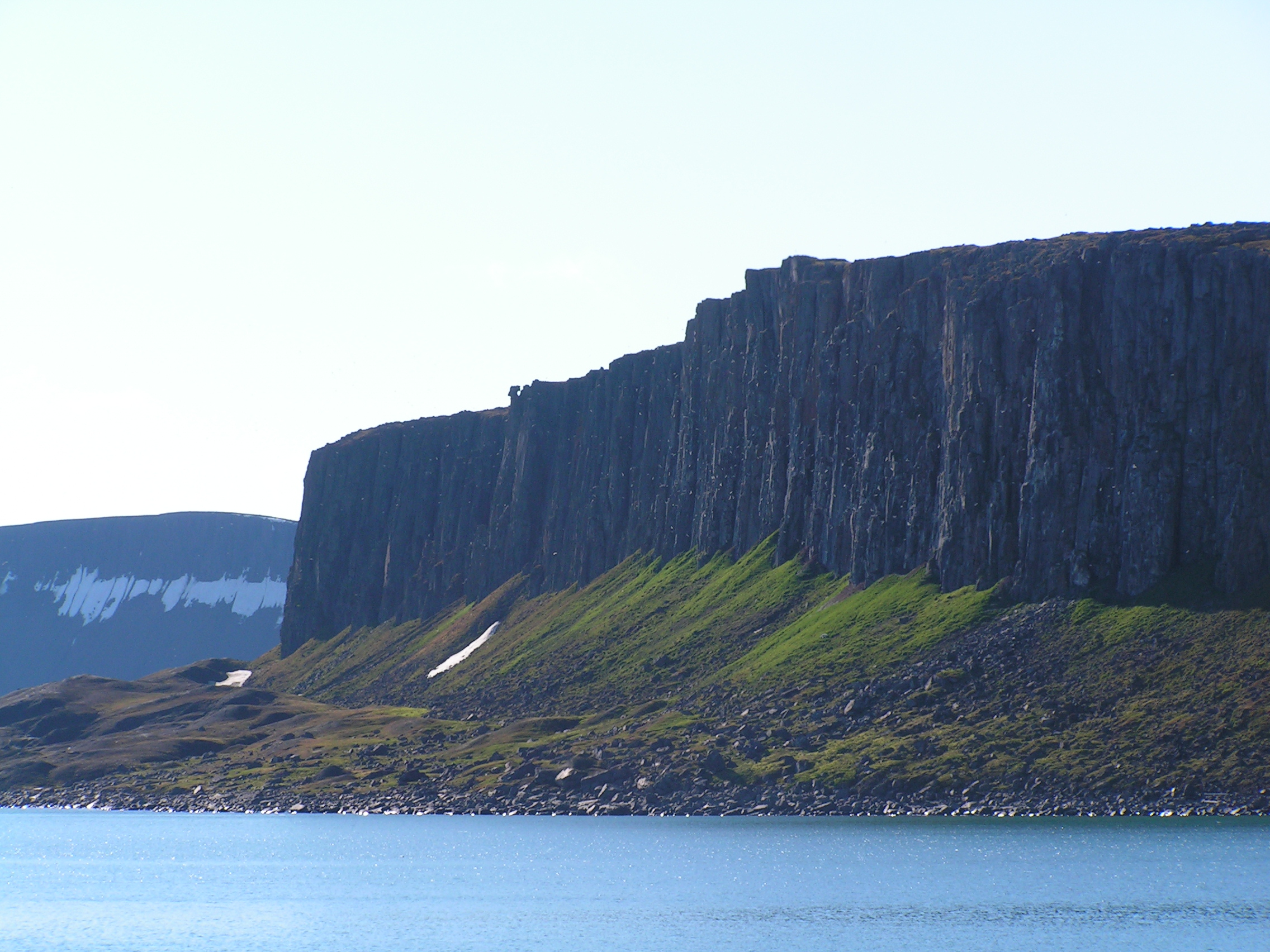
Nesting at Dørstubukta in northeast Barentsøya

Around 43 percent of the island's 1,288 square kilometres (497 sq mi) area is glaciated, and much of the surface rock has been eroded over millions of years by glaciation.

== See also ==
- List of islands of Norway

== Line notes ==
- C. Michael Hogan (2008) Polar Bear: Ursus maritimus, globalTwitcher.com, ed. Nicklas Stromberg
