= 1863 in the United States =

- Decades: 1840s; 1850s; 1860s; 1870s; 1880s
- See also: History of the United States (1849–1865); Timeline of United States history (1860–1899); List of years in the United States

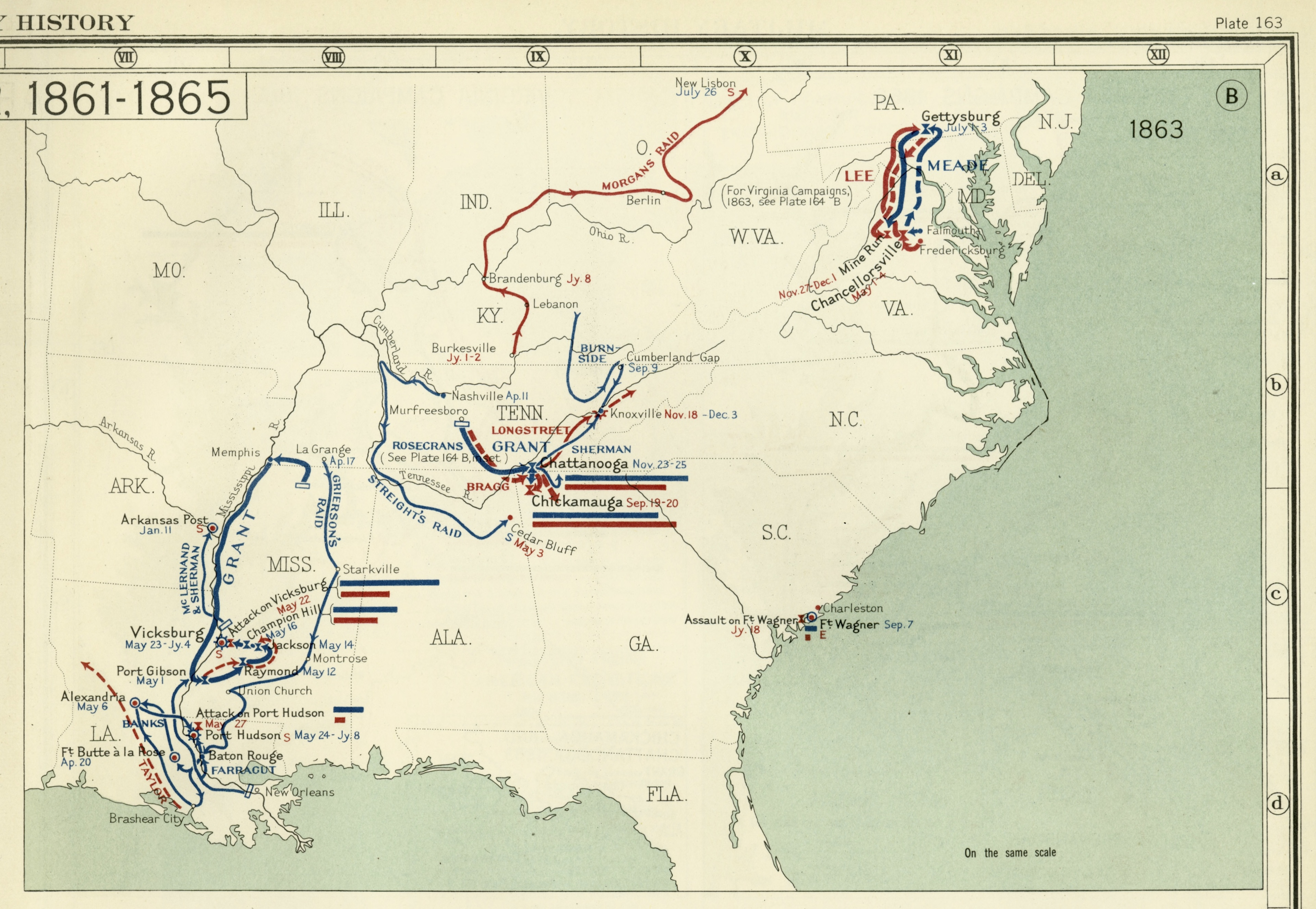
1863 in the United States

Events from the year 1863 in the United States.

== Incumbents ==
=== Federal government ===
- President: Abraham Lincoln (R-Illinois)
- Vice President: Hannibal Hamlin (R-Maine)
- Chief Justice: Roger B. Taney (Maryland)
- Speaker of the House of Representatives:

Galusha A. Grow (R-Pennsylvania) (until March 4)
Schuyler Colfax (R-Indiana) (starting December 7)

- Congress: 37th (until March 4), 38th (starting March 4)

==== State governments ====
Governors and lieutenant governors

=== Governors ===
- Governor of Alabama: John Gill Shorter (Democratic) (until December 1), Thomas H. Watts (Democratic) (starting December 1)
- Governor of Arkansas: Harris Flanagin (Democratic)
- Governor of California: Leland Stanford (Republican) (until December 10), Frederick Low (Republican) (starting December 10)
- Governor of Connecticut: William A. Buckingham (Republican)
- Governor of Delaware: William Burton (Democratic) (until January 20), William Cannon (Republican) (starting January 20)
- Governor of Florida: John Milton (Democratic)
- Governor of Georgia: Joseph E. Brown (Democratic)
- Governor of Illinois: Richard Yates (Republican)
- Governor of Indiana: Oliver P. Morton (Republican)
- Governor of Iowa: Samuel J. Kirkwood (Republican)
- Governor of Kansas: Charles L. Robinson (Republican) (until January 12), Thomas Carney (Republican) (starting January 12)
- Governor of Kentucky: James F. Robinson (Democratic) (until September 1), Thomas E. Bramlette (Democratic) (starting September 1)
- Governor of Louisiana: Thomas Overton Moore (Democratic)
- Governor of Maine: Israel Washburn, Jr. (Republican) (until January 7), Abner Coburn (Republican) (starting January 7)
- Governor of Maryland: Augustus Bradford (Union)
- Governor of Massachusetts: John Albion Andrew (Republican)
- Governor of Michigan: Austin Blair (Republican)
- Governor of Minnesota: Alexander Ramsey (Republican) (until July 10), Henry A. Swift (Republican) (starting July 10)
- Governor of Mississippi: John J. Pettus (Democratic) (until November 16), Charles Clark (Democratic) (starting November 16)
- Governor of Missouri: Hamilton Rowan Gamble (Republican)
- Governor of New Hampshire: Nathaniel S. Berry (Republican) (until June 3), Joseph A. Gilmore (Republican) (starting June 3)
- Governor of New Jersey: Charles Smith Olden (Republican) (until January 20), Joel Parker (Democratic) (starting January 20)
- Governor of New York: Horatio Seymour (Democratic) (starting January 1)
- Governor of North Carolina: Zebulon Baird Vance (Conservative)
- Governor of Ohio: David Tod (Republican)
- Governor of Oregon: A. C. Gibbs (Republican)
- Governor of Pennsylvania: Andrew Gregg Curtin (Republican)
- Governor of Rhode Island:
  - until March 3: William Sprague IV (Republican)
  - March 3-May 26: William C. Cozzens (Democratic)
  - starting May 26: James Y. Smith (Republican)
- Governor of South Carolina: Milledge Luke Bonham (Democratic)
- Governor of Tennessee: Andrew Johnson (Union)
- Governor of Texas: Francis R. Lubbock (Democratic) (until November 5), Pendleton Murrah (Democratic) (starting November 5)
- Governor of Vermont: Frederick Holbrook (Republican) (until October 9), J. Gregory Smith (Republican) (starting October 9)
- Governor of Virginia: John Letcher (Democratic)
- Governor of West Virginia: Arthur I. Boreman (Republican) (starting June 20)
- Governor of Wisconsin: Edward Salomon (Republican)

=== Lieutenant governors ===
- Lieutenant Governor of California: John F. Chellis (Republican) (starting December 10), Tim N. Machin (Republican) (starting December 10)
- Lieutenant Governor of Connecticut: Roger Averill (Republican)
- Lieutenant Governor of Illinois: Francis Hoffmann (Republican)
- Lieutenant Governor of Indiana: John R. Cravens (Republican) (until October 9), Paris C. Dunning (Democratic) (starting October 9)
- Lieutenant Governor of Iowa: John R. Needham (Republican)
- Lieutenant Governor of Kansas: Joseph Pomeroy Root (Republican) (until January 12), Thomas Andrew Osborn (Republican) (starting January 12)
- Lieutenant Governor of Kentucky: vacant (until December 10), Richard Taylor Jacob (Democratic) (starting December 10)
- Lieutenant Governor of Louisiana: Henry M. Hyams (Democratic)
- Lieutenant Governor of Massachusetts: Joel Hayden (Republican) (starting 1863)
- Lieutenant Governor of Michigan: Henry T. Backus (Republican)
- Lieutenant Governor of Minnesota:
  - until March 4: Ignatius L. Donnelly (Republican)
  - March 4-July 10: Henry A. Swift (Republican)
  - starting July 10: vacant
- Lieutenant Governor of Missouri: William Preble Hall (Republican)
- Lieutenant Governor of New York: David R. Floyd-Jones (Republican) (starting January 1)
- Lieutenant Governor of Ohio: Robert C. Kirk (Republican) (until January 13), Benjamin Stanton (Republican) (starting January 13)
- Lieutenant Governor of Rhode Island: vacant (until March 3), Seth Padelford (Republican) (starting March 3)
- Lieutenant Governor of South Carolina: Plowden Weston (Democratic)
- Lieutenant Governor of Texas: John McClannahan Crockett (Democratic)
- Lieutenant Governor of Vermont: Levi Underwood (Republican) (until month and day unknown), Paul Dillingham (Republican) (starting month and day unknown)
- Lieutenant Governor of Virginia: Robert Latane Montague (no political party)
- Lieutenant Governor of Wisconsin: Butler G. Noble (Republican) (until January 6), Edward Salomon (Republican) (starting January 6)

== Events ==
=== January ===
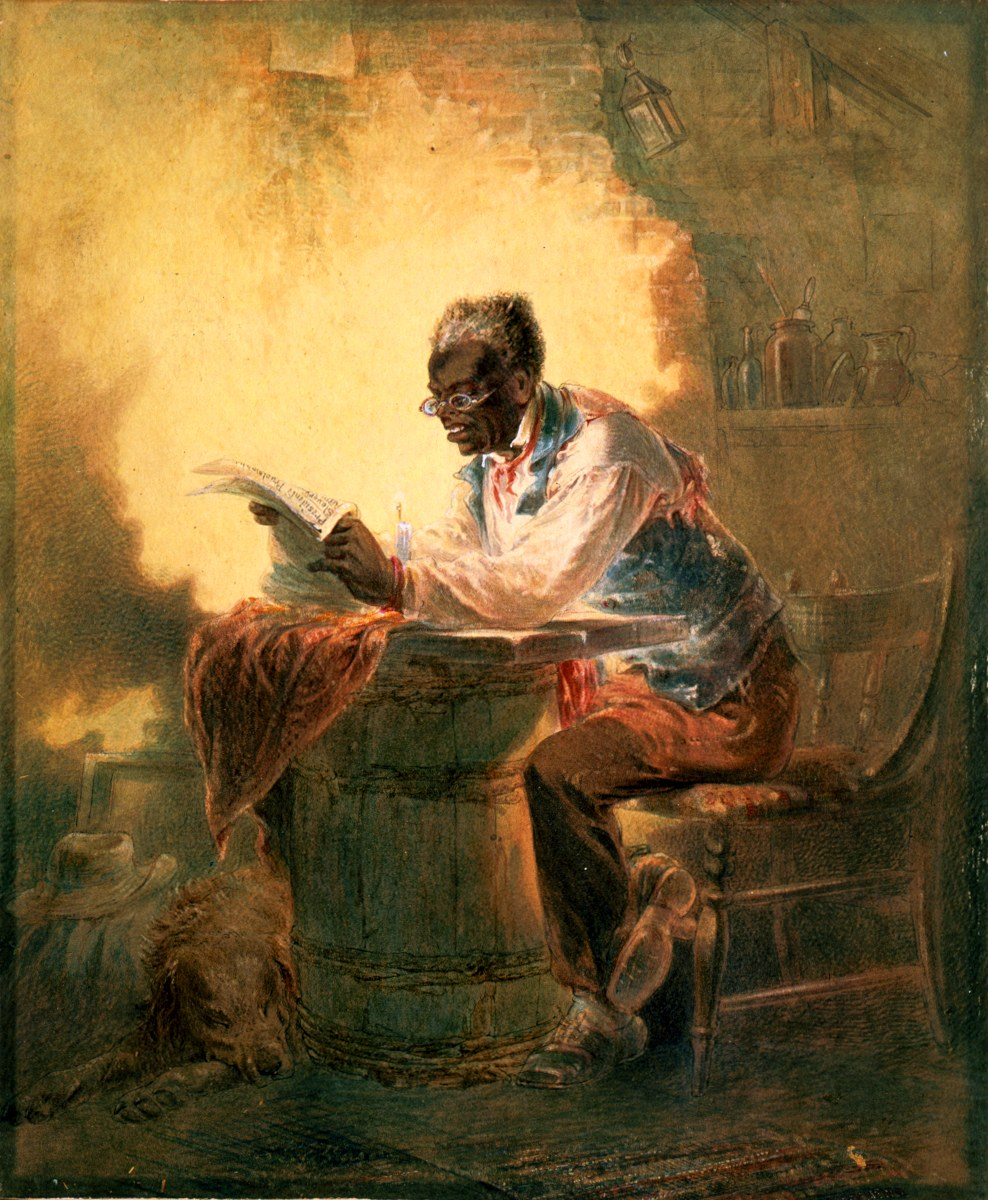
January 1: Emancipation Proclamation

- January 1
  - President Lincoln issues the second executive order of the Emancipation Proclamation, specifying ten Confederate states in which slaves were to be freed.
  - The first claim under the Homestead Act is made for a farm in Nebraska.
- January 3 – The Thomas Nast drawing of the modern Santa Claus appears on the cover of Harper's Weekly, although Santa existed previously.
- January 8 – Ground is broken in Sacramento, California, on the construction of the First transcontinental railroad in the United States.
- January 11 – American Civil War: Battle of Arkansas Post – General John McClernand and Admiral David Dixon Porter capture the Arkansas River for the Union.
- January 29 – In the Bear River Massacre, the U.S. Army attacks a Shoshone encampment in present-day Idaho led by Chief Bear Hunter killing hundreds.

=== February ===
- February 3 – Samuel Clemens first uses the pen name Mark Twain in a Virginia City newspaper, the Territorial Enterprise.
- February 10
  - The world-famous midgets General Tom Thumb and Lavinia Warren get married in New York City; P. T. Barnum takes an entrance fee.
  - The first fire extinguisher patent is granted to Alanson Crane in Virginia.
- February 16 – Kansas State Agricultural College is established as the first land grant college newly created under the 1862 Morrill Act.
- February 24 – Arizona Territory is organized.
- February 26 – Abraham Lincoln signs the National Banking Act into law.

=== March ===
- March 3
  - Idaho Territory is organized by the U.S. Congress.
  - The Enrollment Act is signed, leading to the week-long New York Draft Riots.
  - Third Legal Tender Act is passed.
  - Issue of gold certificates is authorized.
  - President Abraham Lincoln approves charter for the National Academy of Sciences.
- March 19 – The SS Georgiana is destroyed on her maiden voyage while attempting to run the blockade into Charleston, South Carolina. Lost to history, the wreck is discovered March 19, 1965 (exactly 102 years later) by E. Lee Spence.
- March 31 – The charter of Boston College is approved by the Commonwealth of Massachusetts, establishing the college.
- March – La Salle University is established as a Catholic college in Philadelphia.

=== April ===
- April 2 – Southern bread riots: In Richmond, Virginia, about 5,000 people, mostly poor women, riot to protest the exorbitant price of bread.
- April 20 – American Civil War – The Battle of Washington ends inconclusively in Beaufort County, North Carolina.

=== May ===
- May 1–4 – American Civil War: Battle of Chancellorsville – General Robert E. Lee defeats Union forces with 13,000 Confederate casualties, among them Stonewall Jackson (lost to friendly fire), and 17,500 Union casualties.
- May 14 – American Civil War: Battle of Jackson (MS) – Union General Ulysses S. Grant defeats Confederate General Joseph E. Johnston, opening the way for the siege of Vicksburg.
- May 18 – American Civil War: The siege of Vicksburg begins (ends Saturday, July 4, when 30,189 Confederate men surrender).
- May 21
  - American Civil War: The siege of Port Hudson, Louisiana, by Union forces begins.
  - The General Conference of Seventh-day Adventists is formed in Battle Creek, Michigan.
- May 28 – American Civil War: The 54th Massachusetts, the first African-American regiment, leaves Boston, Massachusetts to fight for the Union.

=== June ===
- June 9 – American Civil War: The Battle of Brandy Station, Virginia ends inconclusively.
- June 14 – American Civil War: Second Battle of Winchester – A Union garrison is defeated by the Army of Northern Virginia in the Shenandoah Valley town of Winchester, Virginia.
- June 17 – American Civil War: The Battle of Aldie in the Gettysburg campaign ends inconclusively.
- June 20 – West Virginia is admitted as the 35th U.S. state (see History of West Virginia).

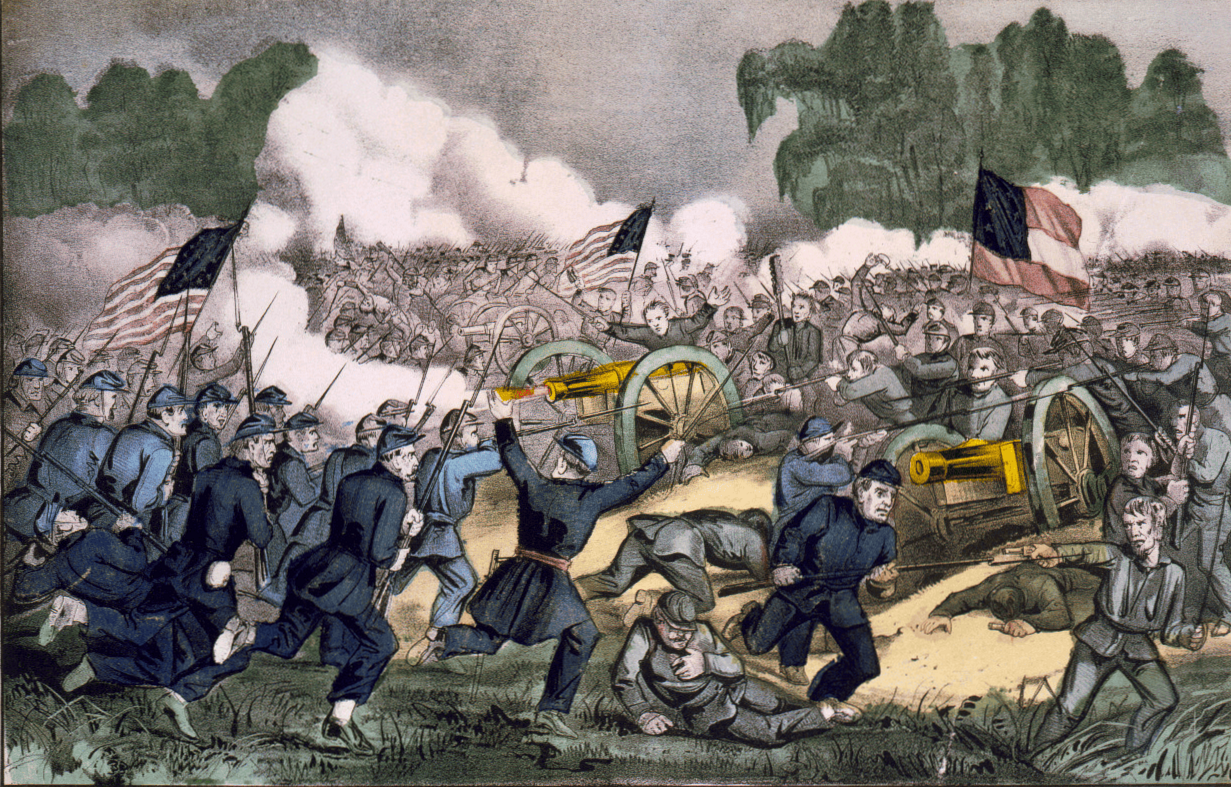
July 1–3: Union victory at Gettysburg

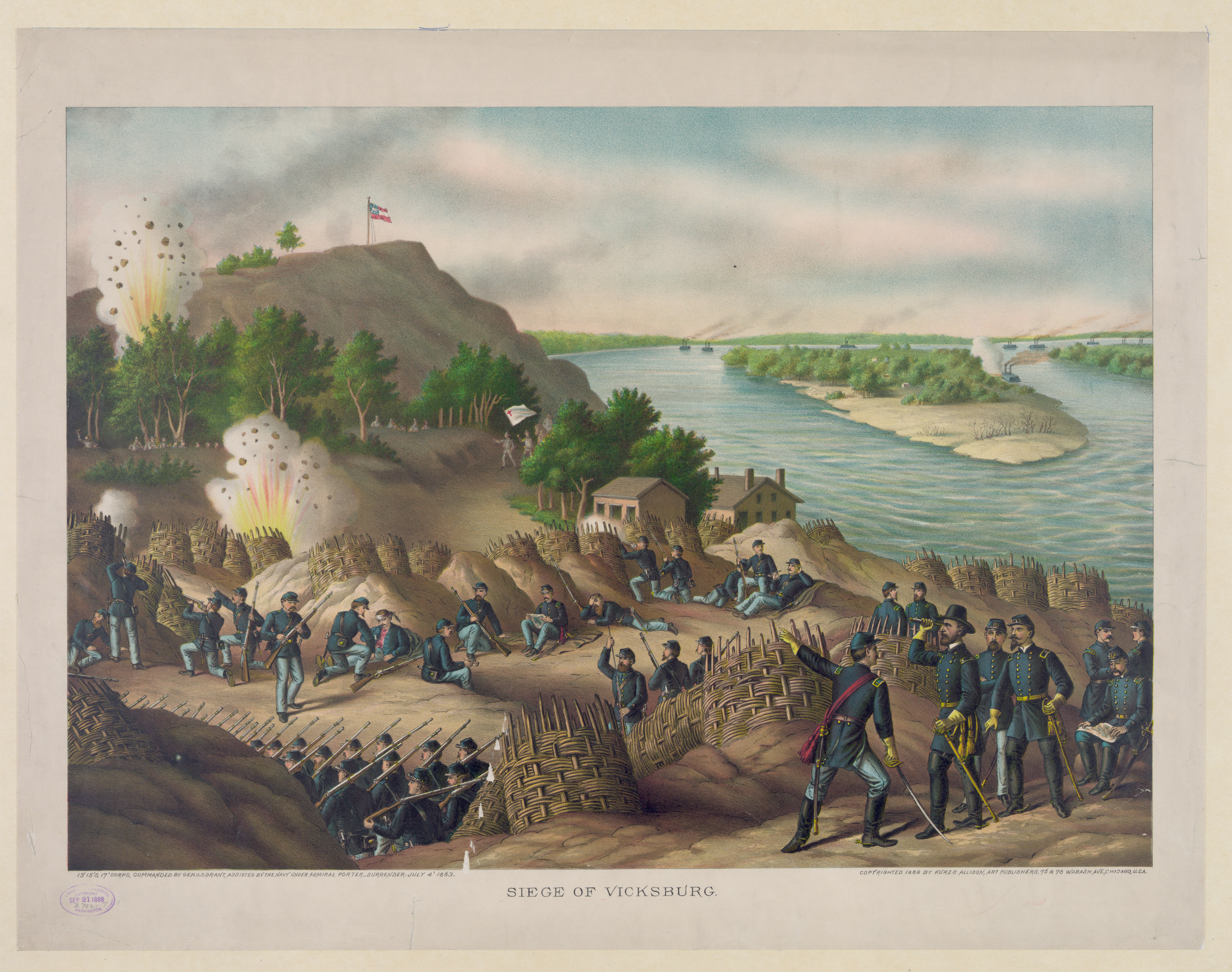
July 4: Union victory at Vicksburg

=== July ===
- July 1–3 – American Civil War: Battle of Gettysburg – Union forces under George G. Meade turn back a Confederate invasion by Robert E. Lee at the Battle of Gettysburg, the largest battle of the war (28,000 Confederate casualties, 23,000 Union).
- July 4 – American Civil War: Battle of Vicksburg – Ulysses S. Grant and the Union army capture the Confederate city Vicksburg, Mississippi, after the town surrendered. The siege lasted 47 days.
- July 9 – The siege of Port Hudson ends and the Union controls the entire Mississippi River for the first time.
- July 13 – American Civil War: New York Draft Riots – In New York City, opponents of conscription begin 3 days of violent rioting, which would later be regarded as the worst in the history of the U.S. with around 120 killed.
- July 18 – American Civil War: The first formal African American military unit, the 54th Massachusetts Volunteer Infantry, unsuccessfully assaults Confederate-held Fort Wagner but their valiant fighting still proves the worth of African American soldiers during the war. Their commander, Colonel Robert Shaw is shot leading the attack and was buried with his men (450 Union, 175 Confederate).
- July 26 – American Civil War: Morgan's Raid – At Salineville, Ohio, Confederate cavalry leader John Hunt Morgan and 375 of his volunteers are captured by Union forces.
- July 30 – Indian Wars: Chief Pocatello of the Shoshone tribe signs the Treaty of Box Elder, promising to stop harassing the emigrant trails in southern Idaho and northern Utah.

=== August ===
- August 8 – American Civil War: Following his defeat in the Battle of Gettysburg, General Robert E. Lee sends a letter of resignation to Confederate President Jefferson Davis (Davis refuses the request upon receipt).
- August 17 – American Civil War: In Charleston, South Carolina, Union batteries and ships bombard Confederate-held Fort Sumter (the bombardment does not end until Thursday, December 31).
- August 21 – American Civil War: Battle of Lawrence – Lawrence, Kansas is attacked by William Quantrill's raiders, who kill an estimated 200 men and boys. The raid becomes infamous in the North as one of the most vicious atrocities of the Civil War.

=== September ===
- September 6 – American Civil War: Confederates evacuate Battery Wagner and Morris Island in South Carolina.
- September 10 – American Civil War: Confederate Major-General Sterling Price evacuates the Arkansas state capital of Little Rock after his defensive line is breached at Bayou Fourche, eight miles below the city.
- September 16 – Robert College of Istanbul–Turkey, the first American educational institution outside the United States, is founded by Christopher Robert, an American philanthropist.

"Four score and seven years ago our fathers brought forth on this continent, a new nation, conceived in Liberty, and dedicated to the proposition that all men are created equal. Now we are engaged in a great civil war, testing whether that nation or any nation so conceived and so dedicated, can long endure."

— From President Abraham Lincoln's Gettysburg Address, November 19, 1863

=== October ===
- October 3 – President Lincoln designates the last Thursday in November as Thanksgiving Day
- October 5 – The Brooklyn, Bath and Coney Island Rail Road starts operations in Brooklyn, New York; this is now the oldest right-of-way on the New York City Subway, the largest rapid transit system in the United States and one of the largest in the world.
- October 14 – American Civil War: Battle of Bristoe Station – Confederate General Robert E. Lee forces fail to drive the Union army out of Virginia.
- October 15 – American Civil War: The first successful submarine, the CSS Hunley sinks during a test, killing Horace Lawson Hunley (its inventor) and a crew of seven.
- October 29 – American Civil War: Battle of Wauhatchie – Forces under Union General Ulysses S. Grant, having fought through the night, ward-off a Confederate attack led by General James Longstreet. Union forces thus open a supply line into Chattanooga, Tennessee.

=== November ===
- November 16 – American Civil War: Battle of Campbell's Station – Near Knoxville, Tennessee, Confederate troops led by General James Longstreet unsuccessfully attack Union forces under General Ambrose Burnside.
- November 17 – American Civil War: The Siege of Knoxville begins – Confederate forces led by General James Longstreet place Knoxville, Tennessee under siege (the 2-week-long siege and 1 failed attack are unsuccessful).
- November 19 – American Civil War: U. S. President Abraham Lincoln delivers the Gettysburg Address at the military cemetery dedication ceremony in Gettysburg, Pennsylvania.
- November 23 – American Civil War: The Battle of Chattanooga III begins – Union forces led by General Ulysses S. Grant reinforce troops at Chattanooga, Tennessee and counter-attack Confederate troops.
- November 24 – American Civil War: Battle of Lookout Mountain – Near Chattanooga, Tennessee, Union forces under General Ulysses S. Grant capture Lookout Mountain and begin to break the Confederate siege of the city led by General Braxton Bragg.
- November 25 – American Civil War: Battle of Missionary Ridge – At Missionary Ridge in Tennessee, Union forces led by General Ulysses S. Grant break the siege of Chattanooga by routing Confederate troops under General Braxton Bragg.
- November 26 – American Civil War: Battle of Mine Run – Union forces under General George Meade position against troops led by Confederate General Robert E. Lee (Meade's forces can not find any weaknesses in the Confederate lines and give up trying after 5 days).
- November 27 – American Civil War: Confederate cavalry leader John Hunt Morgan and several of his men escape the Ohio state prison, and return safely to the South.

=== December ===
- December 8 – President Lincoln issues the Proclamation of Amnesty and Reconstruction.
- December 10 – Leland Stanford, the 8th governor of California, is succeeded by Frederick Low.
- December 25 – Henry Wadsworth Longfellow writes the poem Christmas Bells, or, as it is better known I Heard the Bells on Christmas Day.

=== Ongoing ===
- American Civil War (1861–1865)

== Births ==
- February 12 – Edith Julia Griswold, patent attorney (died 1926)
- March 9 – Mary Harris Armor, suffragist and temperance campaigner (died 1950)
- March 25 – Simon Flexner, pathologist (died 1946)
- March – Texana A. Castle, Texas social worker, missionary (died 1930)
- May 4 – Charles S. Deneen, U.S. Senator from Illinois from 1925 to 1931 (died 1940)
- May 18 – J. Hamilton Lewis, U.S. Senator from Illinois from 1913 to 1919 (died 1939)
- June 14 – Judson S. Siler, member of the Washington House of Representatives from 1913 to 1921 and 1923 to 1929 (died 1942)
- October 1 – Adolph Otto Niedner, cartridge designer (died 1954)
- October 9 – Enoch J. Rector, cinema technician, inventor, and film director (died 1957)
- October 18 – Tommy Tucker, baseball pioneer (died 1935)
- October 21 – Ralph H. Cameron, U.S. Senator from Arizona from 1921 to 1927 (died 1953)
- October 29 – Mark Baldwin, baseball player (died 1929)
- October 31 – William Gibbs McAdoo, U.S. Senator from California from 1913 to 1918 (died 1941)
- November 29 – Aaron S. Watkins, presidential candidate (Prohibition Party) (died 1941)
- December 5 – Pattillo Higgins, American oil pioneer, businessman (Prophet of Spindletop) (d. 1955)
- December 7 – Richard Warren Sears, co-founder of Sears, Roebuck and Company (died 1914)
- December 11
  - T. Coleman du Pont, U.S. Senator from Delaware from 1921 to 1922 and from 1925 to 1928 (died 1930)
  - Annie Jump Cannon, astronomer and academic (died 1941)
- December 13 – Mason Patrick, Chief of U.S. Air Service, American Expeditionary Forces 1918 (died 1942)
- Undated – Alfred Owen Crozier, attorney (died 1939)

== Deaths ==
- January 3 – John Branch, United States Senator from North Carolina from 1817 till 1820. (born 1782)
- February 13 – Presley Spruance, United States Senator from Delaware from 1847 till 1853. (born 1785)
- February 19 – Roger Sherman Baldwin, United States Senator from Connecticut from 1847 till 1851. (born 1793)
- February 27 – Henry Hoʻolulu Pitman, American Union Army soldier of Native Hawaiian descent (born 1845)
- March 18 – Powhatan Ellis, United States Senator from Mississippi from 1825 till 1826 and from 1827 till 1832. (born 1790)
- March 22 – Opothleyahola, chief and diplomat of the Upper Creeks (Mvskokvlke)
- May 10 – Stonewall Jackson, Confederate general (born 1824)
- June 26 – Andrew Hull Foote, naval officer during the American Civil War (born 1806)
- July 3 – George Hull Ward, Union army officer (b. 1826)
- July 26
  - John J. Crittenden, United States Senator from Kentucky 1817–1819, 1835–1841, 1842–1848, and 1855–1861. (born 1787)
  - Sam Houston, President of the Republic of Texas (born 1793)
- July 29 – Matthew Garrison, slave trader of Louisville, Kentucky
- September 16 – Richard Brodhead, United States Senator from Pennsylvania from 1851 to 1857. (born 1811)
- November 2 – Theodore Judah, railroad engineer (born 1826)
- December 2 – Jane Pierce, First Lady of the United States (born 1806)
- December 3 – John Wales, United States Senator from Delaware from 1849 till 1851. (born 1783)

== See also ==
- Timeline of United States history (1860–1899)
