= Crozier (surname) =

Crozier is a surname. Clan Crozier is a clan from the border area between England and Scotland.

Notable people with the surname include:

- Adam Crozier (born 1964), Scottish businessman
- Alec Crozier (1904–1974), Australian rules footballer
- Alfred Owen Crozier (1863–1939), American attorney and author
- Andrew Crozier (1943–2008), British poet
- Baptist Crozier (1878–1957), British Army general
- Blanche Crozier (1881–1957), Canadian actress
- Brett Crozier (born 1970), United States Navy officer
- Brian Crozier (1918–2012), British journalist and intelligence expert
- Brian Crozier (guitarist), American guitarist
- Bruce Crozier (1938–2011), Canadian politician from Ontario
- Catharine Crozier (1914–2003), American organist
- Cecily Crozier (1911–2006), Australian artist, poet and literary editor
- Daniel Crozier, American composer and academic
- Digby Crozier (1927–2024), Australian politician
- Douglas James Smyth Crozier (1908–1976), Irish educator and civil servant
- Ed Crozier, Scottish rugby union footballer and referee
- Eric Crozier (1914–1994), British theatrical director and producer
- Eric Crozier (baseball) (born 1978), American baseball player
- Fitzroy Crozier (born 1936), Ceylon cricketer
- Francis Crozier (1796–1848?), Irish naval officer and polar explorer
- Frank Percy Crozier (1879–1937), British Army officer
- Frank R. Crozier (1883–1948), Australian war artist
- Georges Crozier (1882–1944), French football goalkeeper
- Georgie Crozier (born 1963), Australian politician
- Greg Crozier (born 1976), Canadian ice hockey player
- Hayden Crozier (born 1993), Australian rules footballer
- Hazel Webb-Crozier, British costume designer
- Ian Crozier (born 1970/1), American physician
- Joe Crozier (1929–2022), Canadian ice hockey player and coach
- Joe Crozier (footballer, born 1889) (1889–1960), English footballer
- Joe Crozier (footballer, born 1914) (1914–1985), Scottish football goalkeeper
- John Crozier (archbishop of Armagh) (1853–1920), Church of Ireland archbishop
- John Crozier (bishop of Tuam, Killala and Achonry) (1879–1966), Church of Ireland bishop,son of the archbishop
- John Crozier (politician) (1814–1887), Australian pastoralist, winemaker and politician
- John Derek Crozier known as Crosaire (1917–2010), Pseudonymous Irish crossword compiler
- John Hervey Crozier (1812–1889), American attorney and politician from Tennessee
- Lee Crozier (born 1973), English cricketer
- Leif Newry Fitzroy Crozier (1846–1901), Canadian police officer
- Lorna Crozier (born 1948), Canadian poet and academic
- Max Crozier (born 2000), Canadian ice hockey player
- Michael Crozier (1937–2012), New Zealand physicist and politician
- Michel Crozier (1922–2013), French sociologist
- Oscar Crozier (c.1843–c.1893), American planter and politician from Louisiana
- Paddy Crozier, Irish Gaelic footballer and manager
- Ray Crozier (1930–2015), Australian rules footballer
- Robert Crozier (1827–1895), American judge
- Robert Crozier (artist) (1815–1891), English painter
- Roger Crozier (1942–1996), Canadian ice hockey goaltender
- Samuel Crozier, American politician from Illinois of the early 19th century
- William Crozier (artillerist) (1855–1942), United States Army general
- William Crozier (cricketer) (1873–1916), Irish cricketer
- William Crozier (Irish artist) (1930–2011), Irish artist
- William Crozier (Scottish artist) (1893–1930), Scottish painter
- William John Crozier (1892–1955), American physiologist
- William Percival Crozier (1879–1944), British journalist and newspaper editor

== See also ==
- Crosier (surname)
