= Crosier (disambiguation) =

A crosier, or crozier, is the stylized staff of office carried by high-ranking Roman Catholic, Eastern Orthodox, Anglican, some Lutheran, and Pentecostal prelates.

Crosier or Crozier may also refer to:

== Places ==
- Crozier (crater), a lunar crater
- Crozier, Virginia, USA, an unincorporated community
- Crozier, Arizona, USA, a census-designated place
- Cape Crozier, the most easterly point of Ross Island in Antarctica
- Crozier Island, off the northwest coast of Greenland

== Other uses ==
- Crosier (surname)
- Crozier (surname)
- Crosiers, general name for several similar Roman Catholic orders
- Crozier (mycology), an anatomical feature of many fungi in the phylum Ascomycota
- Crozier, another name for fiddlehead, a furled frond of a young fern
