= Territorial dispute =

Boundary dispute

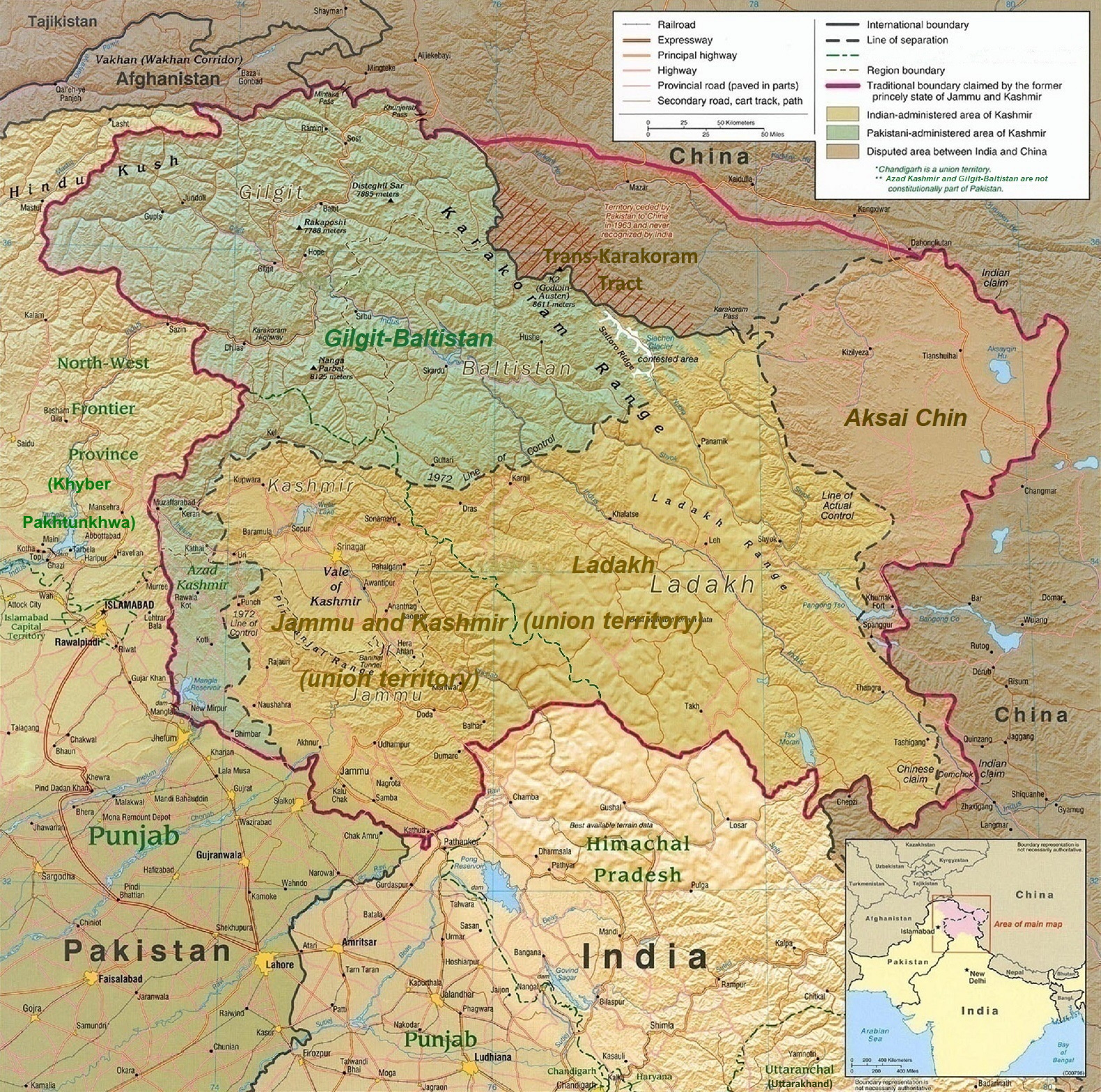
Kashmir is a region in South Asia that is disputed between India, Pakistan, and China. It is hence divided by ceasefire lines instead of regular state borders: the Line of Control separates Indian-controlled territory from Pakistani-controlled territory; while the Line of Actual Control separates Indian-controlled territory from Chinese-controlled territory. China and Pakistan do not claim each other's territory per a 1963 agreement.

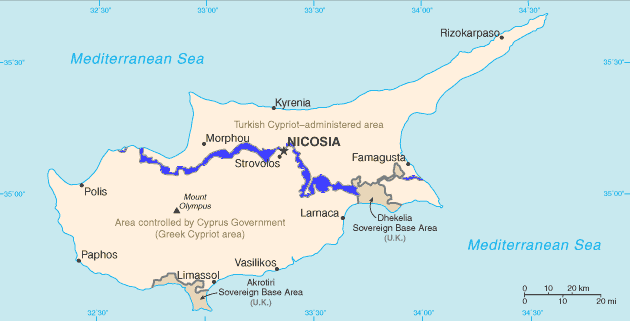
Map of the United Nations Buffer Zone in Cyprus, established due to the Cyprus problem between Greeks and Turks. It divides the Republic of Cyprus in half, separating it from the internationally unrecognized Turkish Republic of Northern Cyprus.

A territorial dispute is a geopolitical phenomenon in which two or more political entities lack consensus on borders and sovereignty anywhere over land, water, or airspace.

== Context and definitions ==
Territorial disputes are often related to the possession of natural resources such as rivers, fertile farmland, mineral or petroleum resources, although the disputes can also be driven by culture, religion, and ethnic nationalism. Territorial disputes often result from vague and unclear language in a treaty that set up the original boundary.

Territorial disputes are a major cause of terrorism and war, as states often try to assert their sovereignty over a territory through invasion, and non-state entities try to influence the actions of politicians through terrorism. International law does not support the use of force by one state to annex the territory of another state. The UN Charter states, "All Members shall refrain in their international relations from the threat or use of force against the territorial integrity or political independence of any state, or in any other manner inconsistent with the Purposes of the United Nations." In some cases, in which the boundary is not demarcated, such as the Taiwan Strait, and Kashmir, the parties involved define a Line of Control, which serves as the de facto international border.

- The term border dispute (or border conflict) applies to cases in which a limited territory is disputed by two or more states, each contending state would publish its own maps to include the same region which would invariably lie along or adjacent to the recognised borders of the competing states, such as the Abyei region which is contested between South Sudan and the Sudan. With border conflicts, the existence of the rival state is not being challenged, such as the relationship between the People's Republic of China and the Republic of China or the relationship between North Korea and South Korea, but each state recognises the shape of the rival state only as not containing the claimed territory, despite who actually governs the land and how it is recognised in the international community.
- An occupied territory, in general, is a region distinct from the recognized territory of the sovereign states but which the occupying state controls, usually with military forces. Sometimes, a long-term occupation is maintained as a means to act upon a territorial claim, but an occupation may also be strategic (such as creating a buffer zone or preventing a rival power from obtaining control) or a means of coercion (such as a punishment, to impose some internal measures, or for use as a bargaining chip).
- The term irredentism applies to border disputes but also to wider territorial claims:
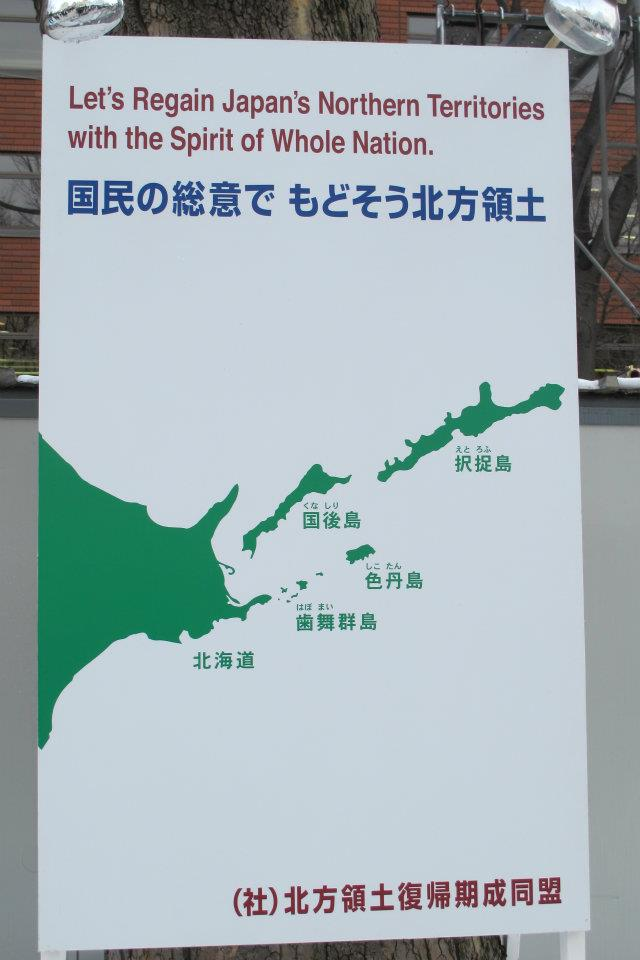
  1. A Japanese poster calling for the return of the Northern Territories from Russian administration
    If a nation emerges when declaring independence from a larger state, its ultimate recognition may not always grant the new state control over the territory it proposed as part of the declaration. Those lands remain unredeemed territory in the eyes of nationalist movements from the state, but do not otherwise cause a problem between the governments on each side of the border.
  2. In cases where the territory was achieved through historical conquests, such as an empire, traditionalists may view former colonies as unredeemed territory.

== Basis in international law ==
Territorial disputes have significant meaning in the international society, both by their relation to the fundamental right of states, sovereignty, and also because they are important for international peace. International law has significant relations with territorial disputes because territorial disputes tackle the basis of international law: the state's territory. International law is based on the persons of international law, which requires a defined territory, as mentioned in the 1933 Montevideo Convention on the Rights and Duties of States.

Article 1 of the Montevideo Convention declares that "[t]he state as a person of international law should possess the following qualifications: (a) a permanent population; (b) a defined territory; (c) government; and (d) capacity to enter into relations with other States" Also, B. T. Sumner's article mentions, "In international law and relations, ownership of territory is significant because sovereignty over land defines what constitutes a state."

Therefore, the breach of a country's borders or territorial disputes poses a threat to a state's very sovereignty and the right as a person of international law. In addition, territorial disputes are sometimes brought to the International Court of Justice, as was the case in Costa Rica and Nicaragua (2005). Territorial disputes cannot be separated from international law, whose basis is on the law of state borders, and their potential settlement also relies on international law and the Court.

== Maritime disputes ==
Maritime security is a broad term referring to issues in the maritime domain that relate to national security, the marine environment, economic development, and human security. The concept includes traditional concerns relating to interstate conflict and naval power, as well as maritime crime, terrorism, shipping, resource exploitation, environmental protection, and the security and welfare of people dependent on the sea.

== Land versus sea: foundational differences ==
Maritime disputes differ from territorial disputes on land. The physical characteristics of the maritime domain, the distribution of jurisdiction under international law, and the economic importance of maritime transportation influence the ways in which maritime disputes develop, escalate, and are resolved.

=== Several dimensions ===
The maritime domain comprises several overlapping physical layers, including the seabed, the water column, and the sea surface. Different activities and disputes may therefore concern different parts of the maritime domain. For example, shipping primarily takes place at the surface, fisheries operate within the water column, and submarine cables and seabed resources are located on or beneath the seabed. The United Nations Convention on the Law of the Sea (UNCLOS) establishes different rights and rules concerning these spaces. This multidimensional character means that different forms of activity can take place in the same geographical area while being subject to different interests, legal regimes, and security concerns.

=== No permanent frontline ===
Maritime disputes differ from many territorial disputes on land because the ocean generally cannot be permanently occupied in the same manner as on land. States instead exercise different forms of jurisdiction and sovereign rights over maritime zones established under international law. Consequently, maritime conflicts often consist of episodic and geographically dispersed incidents rather than sustained territorial occupation. Such incidents may include the seizure or detention of vessels, attacks on ships, sinkings, or damage to maritime infrastructure such as submarine cables.

=== Jurisdiction ===
The United Nations Convention on the Law of the Sea (UNCLOS) establishes several maritime zones, including the territorial sea, contiguous zone, exclusive economic zone (EEZ), continental shelf, and high seas. The rights and jurisdiction of states vary between these zones, and their boundaries may themselves be disputed. Within the territorial sea, coastal states exercise sovereignty subject to certain rights of foreign vessels, including innocent passage. In the EEZ, coastal states possess sovereign rights concerning the exploration and exploitation of natural resources but do not generally exercise the same sovereignty as in the territorial sea. Beyond areas of national jurisdiction, the high seas are subject to a different legal regime based in part on the freedom of navigation and other freedoms recog-nized by the UNCLOS. The combination of overlapping jurisdictions and competing claims can create opportunities for interstate disputes.

=== Civilian populations ===
The sea differs from land in that it generally does not have permanent civilian populations. While land-based conflicts include the protection of Civilians, the maritime area has no direct equivalent. This affects the way questions of civilian protection arise in maritime disputes. Maritime populations are nevertheless connected to the sea through activities such as fishing, shipping, energy production, and migration, while coastal communities may depend directly on marine resources and maritime trade. The absence of permanent populations therefore does not imply an absence of human consequences. Maritime insecurity can affect seafarers, fishers, coastal communities and other people dependent on the sea, and maritime violence can cause significant loss of life and economic disruption.

=== High seas ===
Unlike land, large areas of the ocean belong to no single state. The high seas are governed by principles such as the Freedom of navigation. This distinguishes the maritime space from land, where virtually all territory is subject to the sovereignty or jurisdiction of a state. The governance of maritime space therefore depends on both relations between individual states as well as international law and international institutions.

=== Economic dependence on the sea ===
The importance of maritime transportation to international trade means that relatively localized disputes can have consequences extending well beyond the immediate area of an incident. Maritime security is consequently closely connected to economic security and the functioning of global supply chains. The 2021 Suez Canal obstruction, in which the container ship Ever Given blocked the Suez Canal, demonstrates how an incident affecting a single maritime chokepoint cand disrupt international shipping and the global economy.

== State disputes at sea ==
Maritime territorial disputes can arise due to political, economic, legal, historical, and strategic interests among others. As with territorial disputes on land, maritime disputes may concern access to natural resources, questions of sovereignty, ambiguous or competing interpretations of treaties, and the political status of disputed territories.

=== Resources ===
Access to natural resources is a major source of maritime disputes. These resources include petroleum, natural gas, fish stocks, and mineral resources. The Cod Wars and the Turbot War are examples of disputes over resources. The Cod Wars consisted of a series of confrontations between Iceland and the United Kingdom concerning fishing rights in the waters surrounding Iceland. The Turbot War was a 1995 dispute between Canada and Spain over fishing rights in the North Atlantic. The confrontation arose from disagreements over fishing regulations for the Greenland halibut (turbot) under the Northwest Atlantic Fisheries Organization (NAFO) framework. Canada seized the Spanish fishing vessel Estai outside Canada's 200-nautical-mile exclusive economic zone (EEZ), leading to a diplomatic dispute with Spain and the European Union.

=== Political status ===
States may contest maritime territories because of their political, historical, or symbolic significance. The relationship between the People's Republic of China and Taiwan is an example of a broader political dispute with significant maritime and strategic dimensions. By contrast, the Whisky War between Canada and Denmark concerned Hans Island, a small island in the Kennedy Channel between Canada and Greenland. The dispute was notable for its symbolic and political significance despite the limited value of the territory itself.

Some maritime disputes have their origins in borders established during colonialism and decolonization. Such disputes may involve two formerly colonized states or a formerly colonized state and a former colonial power. The Chagos Archipelago dispute between Mauritius and the United Kingdom is an example of such a dispute. This dispute has involved questions of sovereignty, decolonization, self-determination, and the strategic importance of the territory.

=== Rules and jurisdiction ===
States may disagree over which legal rules and jurisdictions apply to a particular maritime area. Such disagreements can concern the interpretation or application of the UNCLOS, maritime boundaries, rights to natural resources, and Freedom of navigation. Where maritime boundaries remain unresolved, states may establish practical arrangements or lines of control that function as de facto boundaries without necessarily resolving the underlying legal dispute.

=== Defense and strategic positioning ===
Maritime territorial interests can also be connected to military defense and strategic positioning. Control over maritime approaches, islands, sea lanes, and areas of strategic importance can affect a state's ability to defend its territory and project military power. Donald Trump's strategic interests in Greenland and therefore the Arctic is an illustration of this dimension of maritime disputes.

=== Routes and access ===
Control over maritime trade routes and maritime chokepoints is another source of dispute. The Strait of Hormuz, the Red Sea, and the Strait of Malacca are important routes for international shipping, making their security and accessibility significant to the global economy. Questions of maritime access can also arise for landlocked states, which depend on access to coastal states and international waterways to participate in international trade.

=== Climate change ===
Climate change is increasingly affecting the physical and strategic characteristics of maritime regions. Changes in the extent and duration of sea ice in the Arctic have increased attention to the potential navigability of the Northwest Passage, a series of maritime routes through the Canadian Arctic Archipelago. Canada considers the waters of the Northwest Passage to constitute internal waters subject to Canadian sovereignty, while the United States has maintained that the passage constitutes an international strait in which vessels enjoy a right of transit passage. The dispute therefore concerns both the legal status of the waters and the extent of Canada's authority to regulate navigation. Climate changes in the Arctic sea-ice conditions have therefore contributed to renewed attention to the legal and strategic significance of the passage, although the extent to which climate change will make the routes consistently suitable for commercial shipping remains uncertain.

== See also ==
- List of territorial disputes
  - List of border conflicts (including only those that involve fighting)
- Fait accompli
- Frozen conflict
- Israeli–Palestinian conflict
- Status quo ante bellum
- Thalweg
- Territorial disputes in the South China Sea
- Territorial disputes of India
- Territorial disputes of China
- Territorial disputes in the Persian Gulf
- Territorial disputes of Nicaragua
