= Whisky War =

Denmark–Canada amicable border dispute

- Part of the Arctic policies of Denmark and Canada
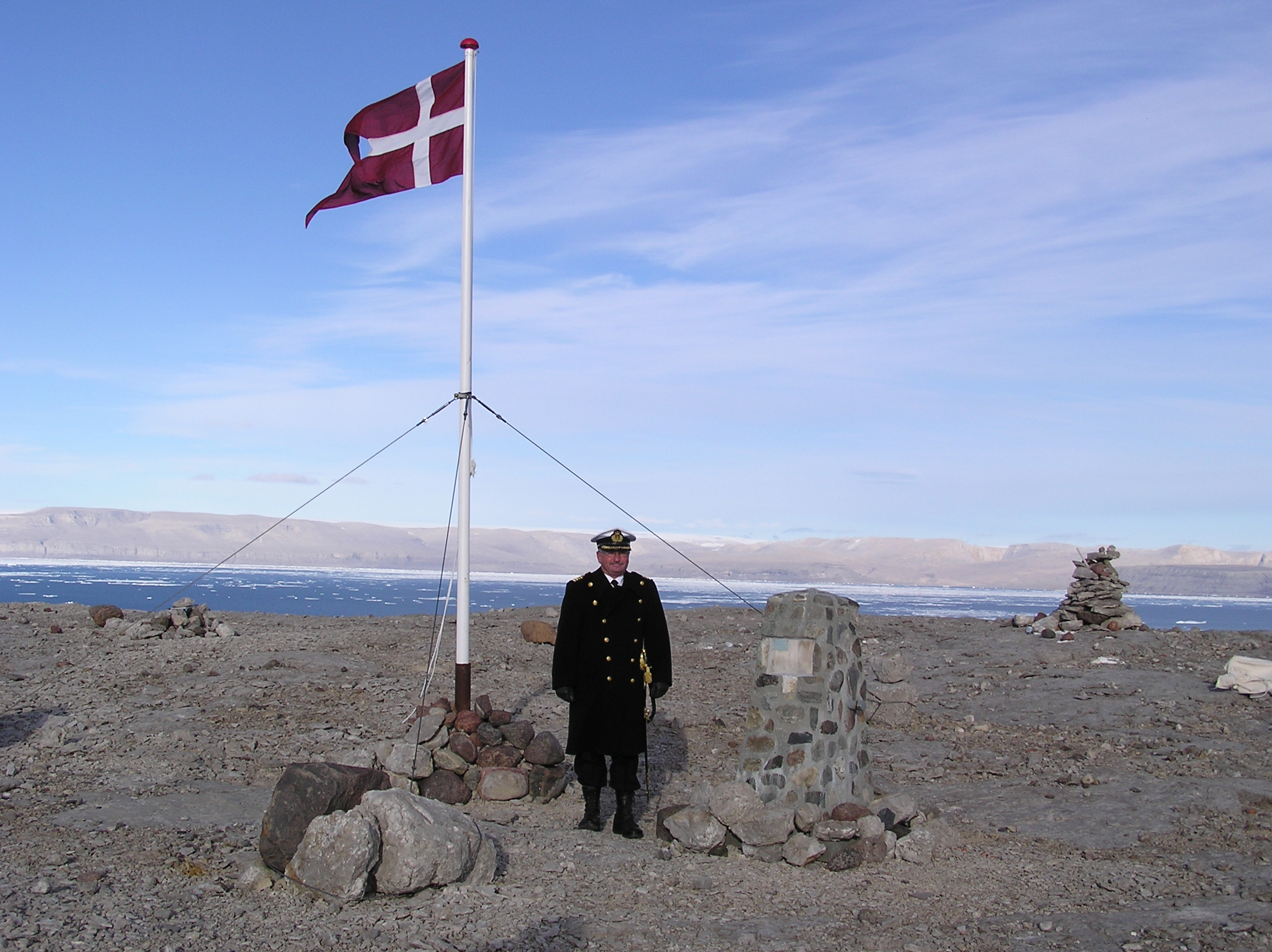
- The commanding officer Cdr. s.g. Per Starklint of the Danish warship HDMS Triton on Hans Island during August 2003
- Date: 17 December 1973 – 14 June 2022
- Location: Hans Island; 80.826389°N 66.458333°W
- Also known as: Liquor Wars
- Type: Border dispute
- Participants: Canada; Denmark
- Outcome: Hans Island divided between Nunavut (Canada) and Greenland (Denmark).

The Whisky War, also known as the Liquor Wars, was an amicable border dispute between the Kingdom of Denmark and Canada over Hans Island. Between 1973 and 2022, the island was under dispute between the two nations, although never in direct conflict or violence.

Both countries agreed on a process in 2005 to resolve the issue, which was finally settled in 2022, resulting in the creation of a land border on the island between the two states.

== Background ==
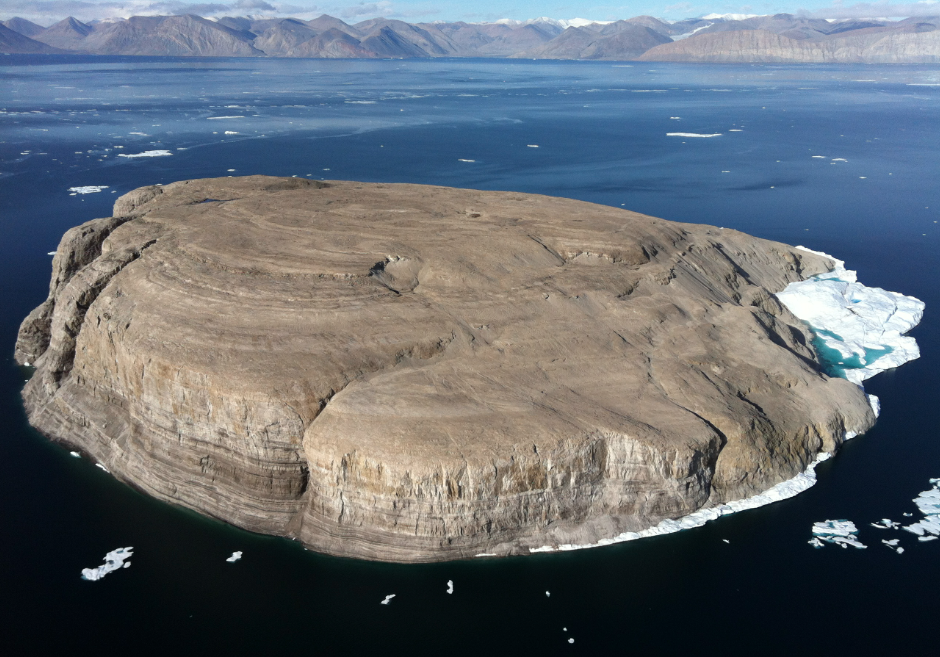
Hans Island as seen from the air in August 2012, with Ellesmere Island in the background

Hans Island (known as Hans Ø in Danish and Tartupaluk in Greenlandic) is in the middle of the Kennedy Channel between Greenland and Ellesmere Island. It is approximately 1.3 km^{2} in size and barren. Hans Island is uninhabited, though it was previously used by indigenous Inuit populations in the area during the 19th century. The Canadian claim to the island arose from the 1880 purchase of Hudson's Bay Company land to Canadian Government territory. The Danish argument was that Hans Island was vital to their indigenous populations for fishing, creating an integral part of the nearby Greenlandic area.

== Land dispute ==
Canada and Denmark signed an agreement through the United Nations on 17 December 1973. The agreement set out to delimit the continental shelf between the two nations. This was influenced by the maritime boundary line, which fell almost directly down the middle of Hans Island. The agreement states:

The Government of the Kingdom of Denmark and the Government of Canada ... Have agreed as follows:

Article I. The dividing line in the area between Greenland and the Canadian Arctic Islands, established for the purpose of each Party's exploration and exploitation of the natural resources of that part of the continental shelf which in accordance with international law appertains to Denmark and to Canada respectively, is a median line which has been determined and adjusted by mutual agreement.

Article II. 1. In implementation of the principle set forth in article I, the dividing line in the area between latitude 61 00' N and latitude 75 00' N (Davis Strait and Baffin Bay) shall be a series of geodesic lines.

The agreement was passed with both nations agreeing to settle the dispute over Hans Island at a later date.

The dispute was seen as low-priority from the Canadian side. A Canadian Special Senate Committee on the Arctic meeting was held on March 18, 2019, where the conflict was deemed "almost insignificant" by Michael Byers, a Professor and Canada Research Chair at the University of British Columbia, consulting as a civilian on the matter.

== Conflict ==
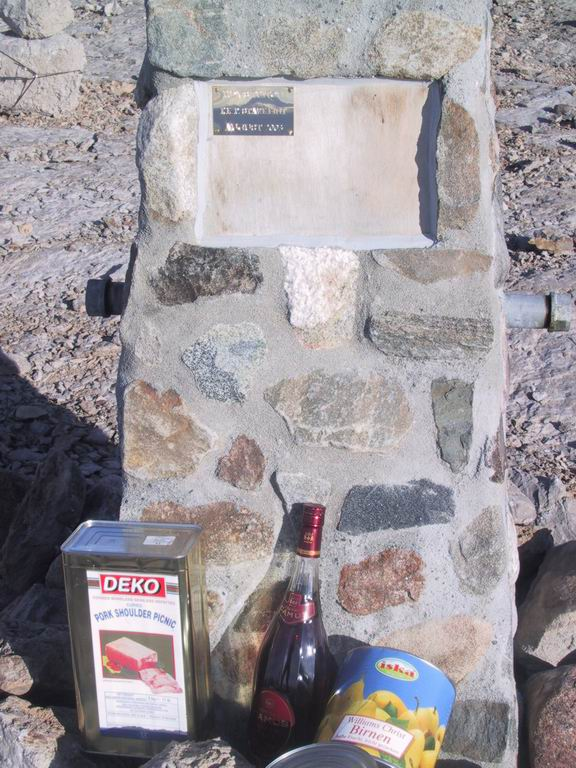
A bottle of cognac and cans of pork and fruit left by Danish forces on Hans Island in 2003

In 1984, Canadian soldiers visited the island and planted a Canadian flag, also leaving a bottle of Canadian whisky. The Danish Minister of Greenland Affairs came to the island himself later the same year with the Danish flag, a bottle of schnapps, and a letter stating "Welcome to the Danish Island" (Velkommen til den danske ø). The two countries proceeded to take turns planting their flags on the island and exchanging alcoholic beverages. In 2005, a Canadian man and an unknown source on the Danish side also posted advertisements on Google to "promote their claims".

The minor border dispute was often considered humorous between the two nations, with diplomats displaying good humour. Despite the serious official nature of the matter, the manner in which the conflict was prosecuted was light-hearted, demonstrated by the length of time taken to settle the dispute, if nothing else. The two nations are on friendly terms, and are also founding members of NATO.

=== Peaceful resolution ===
Canadian newspaper The Globe and Mail reported on June 10, 2022, that the Canadian and Danish governments had settled on a border across the island, dividing it between the Canadian territory of Nunavut and the Danish autonomous territory of Greenland. The resolution occurred during the Russian invasion of Ukraine, and was meant to create a symbolic example to other nations, implying to Russia that land disputes can be resolved peacefully.

The resolution had the side effect of giving Canada and Denmark a land border with each other, meaning that both countries no longer border only one other country (the United States and Germany, respectively).

The resolution was ratified by the Folketing on December 19, 2023, thereby ending the dispute from a Danish perspective.

== Timeline ==
- 1980–1983 – Canadian firm Dome Petroleum did research on and around the island.
- 1984 – Tom Høyem, Danish Minister for Greenland, chartered a helicopter to the island to place a flag and a bottle of schnapps.
- 1988 – The Danish Arctic Ocean patrol cutter HDMS Tulugaq arrived at the island, built a cairn and placed a flagpole and Danish flag on the island.
- 1995 – The Danish liaison officer and geodesists flew in and placed another flagpole and flag.
- Late August 1997 – The Danish Arctic/Ocean patrol cutter HDMS Agpa tried to reach the island, but was forced to turn around 241 km (150 mi) from the Island, owing to extreme ice.
- 2001 – Keith Dewing and Chris Harrison, geologists with the Geological Survey of Canada who were mapping northern Ellesmere Island, flew by helicopter to the island.
- August 13, 2002 – The Danish inspection ship HDMS Vædderen arrived and erected a new cairn, flagpole and flag, finding the 1988 flag missing and the 1995 flag in pieces.
- August 1, 2003 – The crew of the Danish frigate HDMS Triton landed on the island and replaced the Danish flag again.
- July 13, 2005 – Canadian soldiers landed on the Island, placing a traditional Inuit stone marker (Inukshuk) with a plaque and a Canadian flag.
- July 20, 2005 – As a symbolic move, Canadian Defence Minister Bill Graham set foot on the island.
- July 25, 2005 – A Danish government official announced Denmark would issue a letter of protest to Canada.
- July 25, 2005 – Deputy premier of Greenland, Josef Motzfeldt, stated the island had been occupied by Canada, stating experts should determine which country the island belongs to.
- July 28, 2005 – The Danish Ambassador to Canada published an article in the Ottawa Citizen newspaper regarding the Danish view on the Hans Island issue.
- August 4, 2005 – The Danish Arctic/Ocean patrol cutter HDMS Tulugaq was sent from Naval Station Grønnedal to Hans Island to assert Danish sovereignty. The cutter was expected to arrive in three weeks' time.
- August 8, 2005 – Danish newspapers reported Canada wished to open negotiations regarding the future of Hans Island. The news was welcomed by Danish Prime Minister Anders Fogh Rasmussen, who stated "It is time to stop the flag war. It has no place in a modern, international world. Countries like Denmark and Canada must be able to find a peaceful solution in a case such as this."
- August 16, 2005 – According to Danish Foreign Minister Per Stig Møller, Denmark and Canada agreed to reopen negotiations regarding the future of Hans Island. Denmark would immediately begin geological surveys in the area, and Per Stig Møller would meet his Canadian counterpart Pierre Pettigrew in New York City in the middle of September. Should they fail to reach an agreement, both governments have agreed to submit the dispute to the International Court of Justice in The Hague. The government of Greenland agreed to this course of action. Regarding the Danish patrol cutter HDMS Tulugaq then en route to Hans Island, the minister stated "I have instructed the ship to sail there, but they will not go ashore tearing down [the Canadian] flag and replacing it with a new one. It would be a somewhat childish [behaviour] between two NATO allies."
- August 20, 2005 – Canada's Foreign Affairs Minister, Pierre Pettigrew, stated Canada's claim to the island had a firm basis in international law and would likely not end up before a world court. "Our sovereignty over the island has a very strong foundation", the minister said in a telephone interview with a Canadian Press journalist.
- September 19, 2005 – According to Canada's Foreign Affairs Minister, Pierre Pettigrew, Canada and Denmark agreed on a process to resolve the dispute over the island. Pettigrew and his Danish counterpart, Per Stig Møller, met in New York on this day. Pettigrew said the two countries would work together "to put this issue behind us." However Pettigrew reiterated Canada has sovereignty over the island.
- August 16, 2006 – A Vancouver geologist received a prospecting permit for Hans Island from the Canadian government.
- March 17, 2007 – Scientists from the University of Toronto and the Technical University of Denmark announced plans to install an automated weather station on the island, some time in the summer of 2007.
- July 2007 – Canada updated satellite photos and recognized its line constructed for the earlier maritime agreement would have run roughly through the middle of the island; negotiations continued with Denmark over establishing an international land boundary or island sovereignty.
- May 4, 2008 – An international group of scientists from Australia, Canada, Denmark, and the UK installed an automated weather station on Hans Island.
- April 11, 2012 – Proposal for Canada and Denmark to split Hans Island.
- November 29, 2012 – Canada and Denmark settled an agreement on the exact border between them, though without defining the border near Hans Island.
- May 23, 2018 – Canada and Denmark announced a joint task force to settle the dispute over Hans Island.
- February 2019 – Canadian geologist John Robins was granted a mineral exploration claim for Hans Island by the Canadian government as part of efforts to help the cause of Canada's sovereignty claim.
- September 12, 2019 – The Government of Greenland decided to approve a temporary closure of Hans Island for the application for mineral exploration permits. This approval was based on an agreement between Canada and Denmark. The Canadian geologist John Robins therefore had his minerals exploration claim for Hans Island suspended by the Canadian government. The Dane Andreas G. Jensen had his application for mineral exploration permit rejected by the Kingdom of Denmark, because of this closure agreement.
- June 10, 2022 – Meant as evidence on the possibility of diplomatic approaches while the Russian invasion of Ukraine developed, Canada and Denmark settled on a border across the island, dividing it between the Canadian territory of Nunavut and the semi-autonomous Danish constituent country of Greenland.
- June 14, 2022 – The plan for dividing the island between the two nations was officially unveiled.
- October 5, 2023 – A Danish proposal to consent to ratifying the treaty was proposed in the Folketing.
- December 19, 2023 – The Danish parliament approved the proposal to ratify the treaty.

== See also ==
- Pig War (1859)
- War of the Bucket
- Pastry War
