= Canada–Denmark relations =

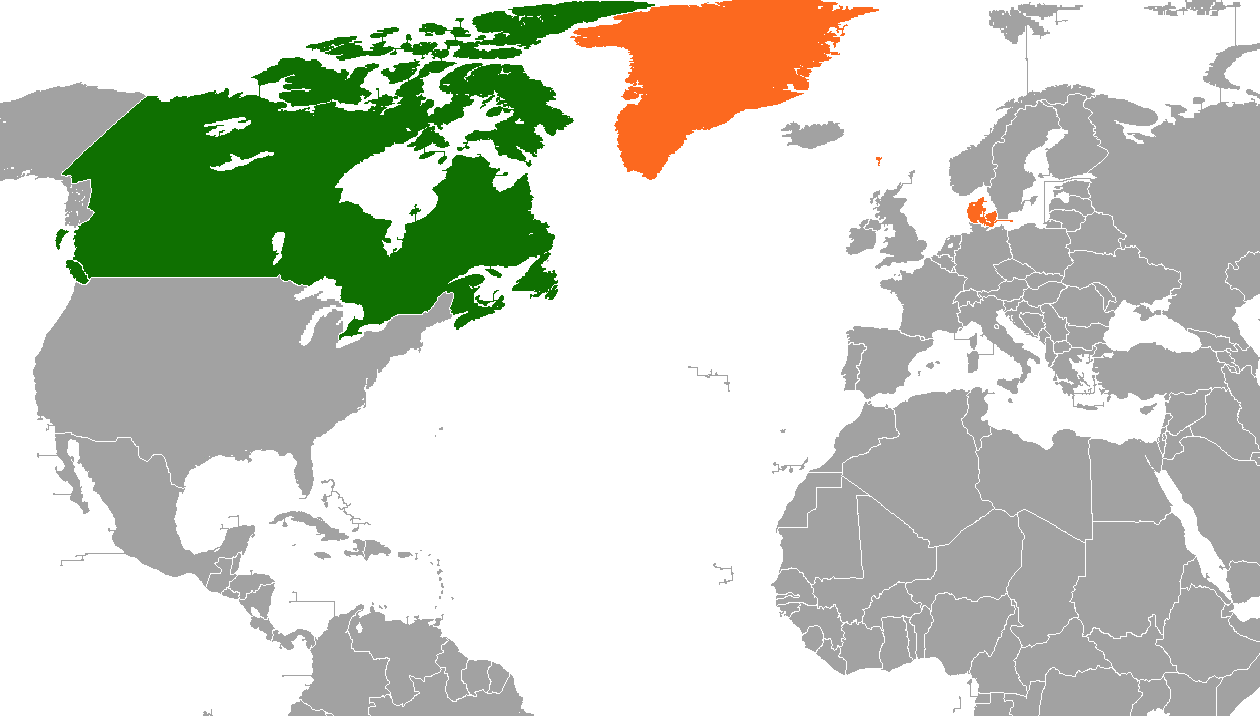

- Canada: Denmark

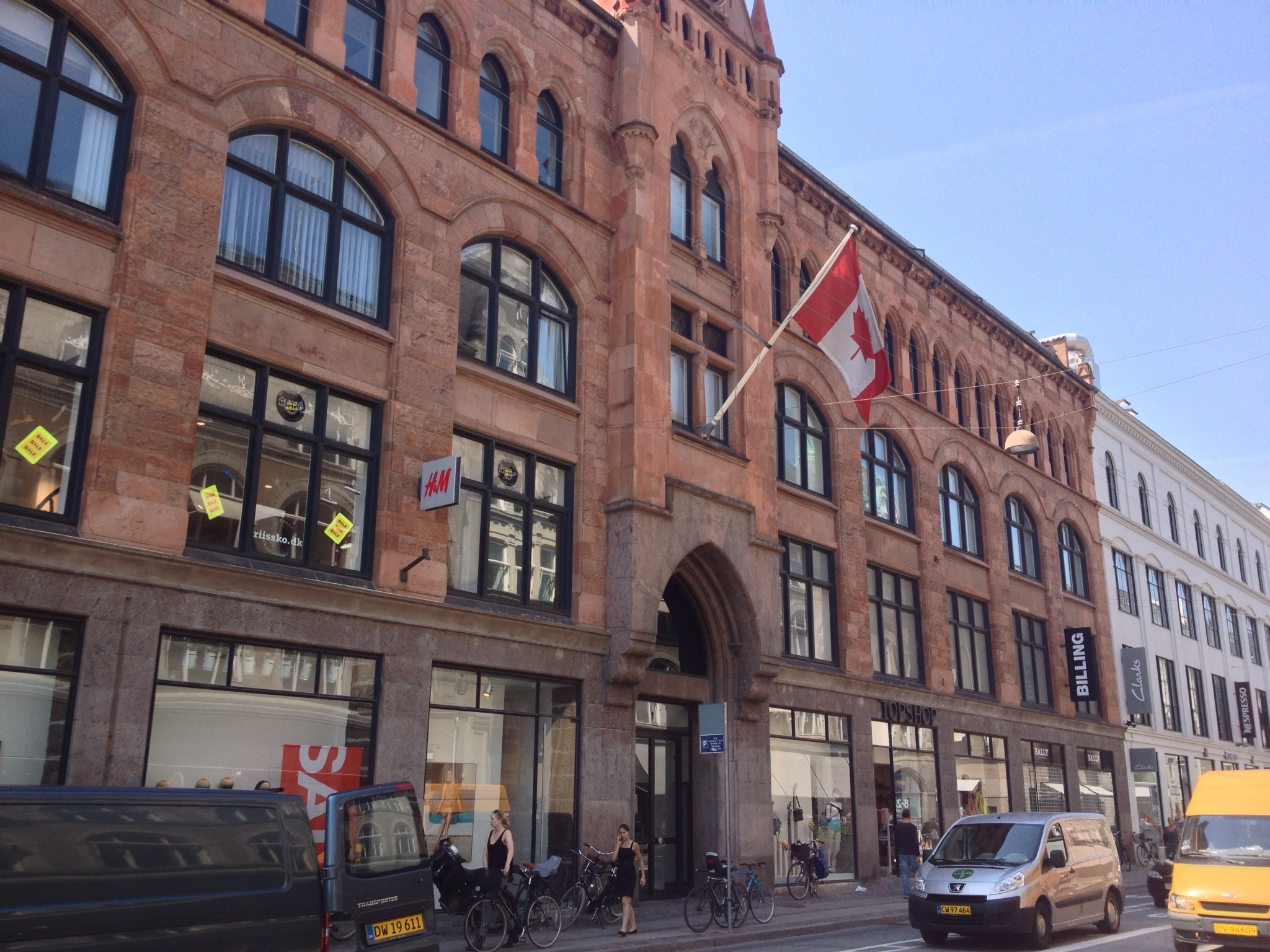
Canadian embassy in Copenhagen, Denmark.

Canada and Denmark have longstanding bilateral relations. Canada has an embassy in Copenhagen. Denmark has an embassy in Ottawa and a consulate-general in Toronto. Both countries are full members of NATO and the Arctic Council. They share a short land border on the island of Hans Island, which is split between the Canadian territory of Nunavut and the Danish autonomous territory of Greenland.

== History ==
In 1928, the bilateral relations between Canada and Denmark were strengthened, when members of the Canadian National Railways met with Thomas Madsen-Mygdal.

The first treaty between Canada and Denmark was a visa requirements agreement, signed on 22 September and 14 October 1949. Both countries signed an agreement concerning taxes in 1956. Canada and Denmark agreed to cooperate with defence science in 1969. In 1983, a marine environmental, social and economic agreement was signed in Copenhagen.

In 2010, the Denmark–USA/Canada Program was launched. The programme aims the internationalization of Danish education programmes.

== Hans Island dispute ==
Hans Island is a small, uninhabited barren knoll measuring 1.3 km^{2} (0.5 sq mi), located in the centre of the Kennedy Channel of Nares Strait. Until 2022, the island was claimed by both Canada and Greenland with the Kingdom of Denmark. In 1973 Canada and the Kingdom of Denmark ratified a treaty defining the border in the area. The treaty did not define the border at Hans Island as no agreement was made on this. In 1984, Tom Høyem, the Danish Minister for Greenland, raised the Danish flag on the island. On 25 July 2005, Canadian Defence Minister Bill Graham visited the island, sparking anger in Denmark. The Government of Denmark sent a letter of protest to Canada. Canada also sent two warships in 2005 to Hans Island, HMCS Shawinigan and HMCS Glace Bay.

On 19 September 2009, both governments put in place a process to end the dispute.

As friendly countries, of course, it is our shared objective that we resolve this issue – that we put this issue behind us… "We now have a process – a process in which the officials will be working together, gathering all of the relative information and trying to find a way forward to do this…

— Pierre Pettigrew

In January 2011, both countries were close to a resolution over the island. However, the border agreement signed in November 2012 did not contain a solution to the dispute.

On 10 June 2022, Canadian newspaper The Globe and Mail reported that the Canadian and Danish governments had settled on a border across the island, dividing it between the Canadian territory of Nunavut and the Danish constituent country of Greenland, to be formally unveiled on 14 June 2022.

== High level visits ==
Princess Margrethe (later Queen of Denmark) and her husband Prince Henrik visited Canada in September 1967. Queen Margrethe also visited Canada in 1991. Crown Prince Frederik and Crown Princess Mary visited Ottawa and Toronto in 2014. When Prince Joachim married Marie they spent their honeymoon in Canada.

== Diaspora ==
About 200,000 people in Canada are of Danish origin or birth. They mostly live in Ontario, Alberta and British Columbia.

New Denmark is a Canadian rural community in Victoria County, New Brunswick. The community derives its name from several Danish settlers who inhabited the area in 1872, eventually forming the largest and what would become the oldest Danish community in Canada; the Danish influence has diminished somewhat in recent decades due to out-migration.

== Embassy ==
Embassy of Denmark in Ottawa
- Location: Ottawa
- Address: 47 Clarence Street
- Coordinates: 45°25′44″N 75°41′38″W

The Embassy of Denmark in Ottawa (Danish: Danmarks Ambassade, Ottawa) is Denmark's embassy in Canada. It is located at suite 450, 47 Clarence Street in Ottawa, the Canadian capital.

Denmark operates secondary Canadian consulate offices in Calgary, Edmonton, Halifax, Iqaluit, Montreal, St. John's, Toronto, Vancouver and Winnipeg.

The Embassy of Canada in Copenhagen is Canada's embassy in Denmark. It is located at Kristen Bernikowsgade 1, 1105 Copenhagen K., Denmark. In 2026, Canada opened a consulate in Nuuk, Greenland.

== See also ==
- Foreign relations of Canada
- Foreign relations of Denmark
- Jens Munk
- Canadians of Danish descent
- International Security Assistance Force
- 2011 military intervention in Libya
- Comprehensive Economic and Trade Agreement
- Denmark–United States relations – Including U.S. attempts to purchase Greenland (similar to Danish West Indies)
