= Franklin Island =

Franklin Island may refer to:

- Franklin Island (Antarctica), an Antarctic island in the Ross Sea
- Franklin Island (Greenland), an island of Greenland in the Nares Strait
