= Joseph Crozier =

Joseph or Joe Crozier may refer to:

- Joe Crozier (1929–2022), Canadian ice hockey player and coach
- Joe Crozier (footballer, born 1889) (1869–1960), English footballer (Middlesbrough FC, Bradford Park Avenue, Grimsby Town)
- Joe Crozier (footballer, born 1914) (1914–1985), Scottish footballer (Brentford FC)
