= Crosier (surname) =

Crosier is a surname, and may refer to:

- Clinton Crosier, United States Air Force general
- Gerald Crosier (1933–2016), American politician
- Kathryn Crosier, New Zealand haematologist
- O. R. L. Crosier (1820–1912), American Christian preacher
- Perry Crosier (1890–1953), American architect
- William H. H. Crosier (1844–1903), Medal of Honor recipient, Union Army soldier

== See also ==
- Crozier (surname)
