= Crozier Island =

Island in the Kennedy Channel

Danish: Crozier Ø
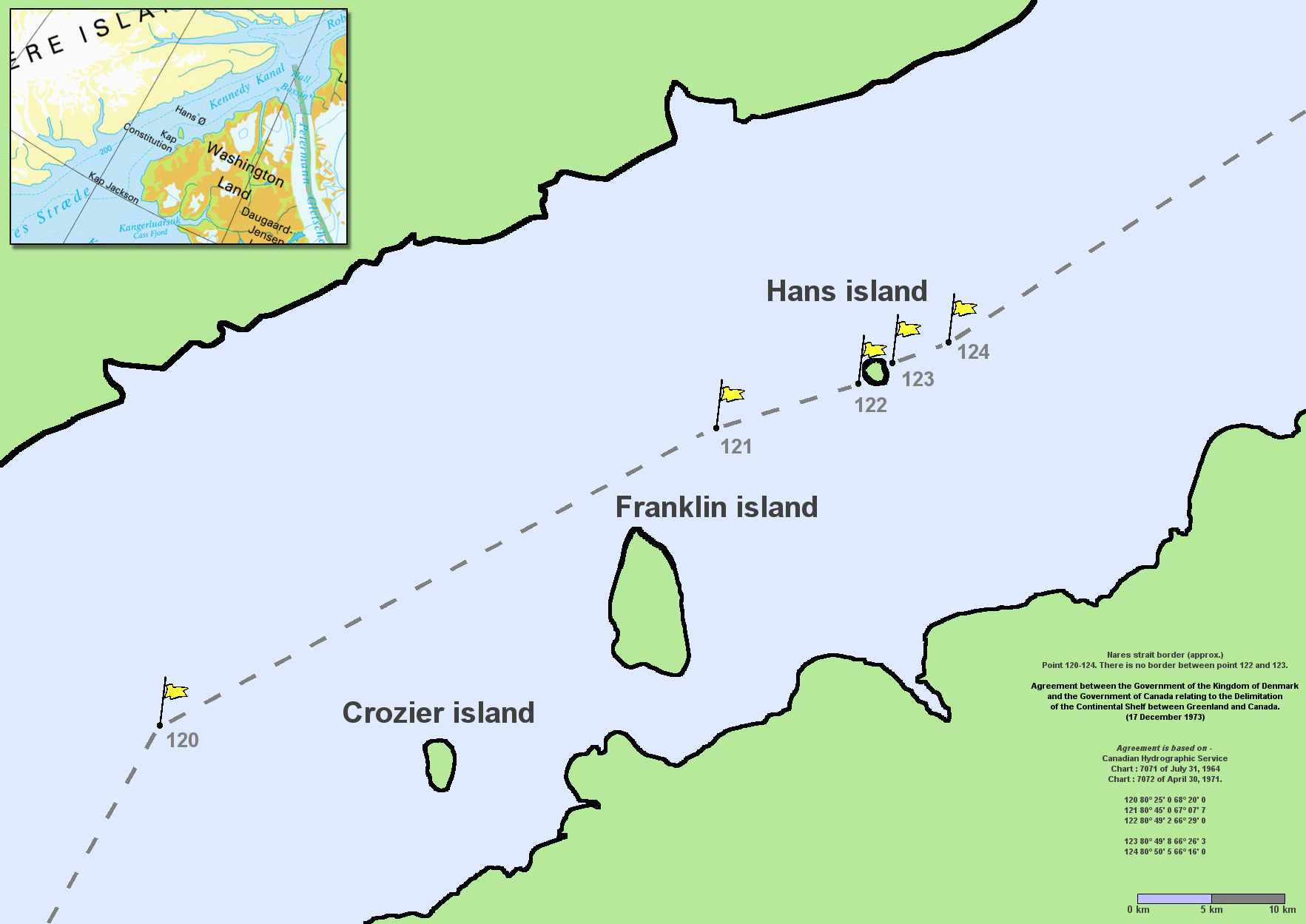
- Nares strait border (Kennedy channel)

- Location within Greenland

Geography
- Coordinates: 80°30′N 67°05′W
- Highest elevation: 60 m (200 ft)

Administration
- Denmark (Greenland)

Crozier Island (Danish: Crozier Ø) is one of three islands located in the Kennedy Channel section of the Nares Strait in the high Arctic. It is part of the Avannaata municipality, Greenland.

== Geography ==
Located to the SW of Franklin Island off Lafayette Bay of the Washington Land coast, Crozier Island is the southernmost island of the Kennedy Channel group, the other ones being Franklin Island and Hans Island. The former is also part of Greenland, whilst the latter's ownership is shared between Greenland and Canada. The cliffs at its southwest side rise to a height of 60 m (200 ft) and the island is reported to be easily identified.

Crozier Island is named after the Irish-born, British naval officer Francis Rawdon Moira Crozier, second-in-command (and commander after Franklin's death) of John Franklin's ill-fated Naval Northwest Passage Expedition, 1845–1848, by Elisha Kent Kane between 1854 and 1855 during his Second Grinnell Expedition, after it was sighted by Hans Hendrik and the American William Morton in June 1854.

== See also ==
- List of islands of Greenland
