= Franklin Island (Greenland) =

Island in Greenland, in the Kennedy Channel

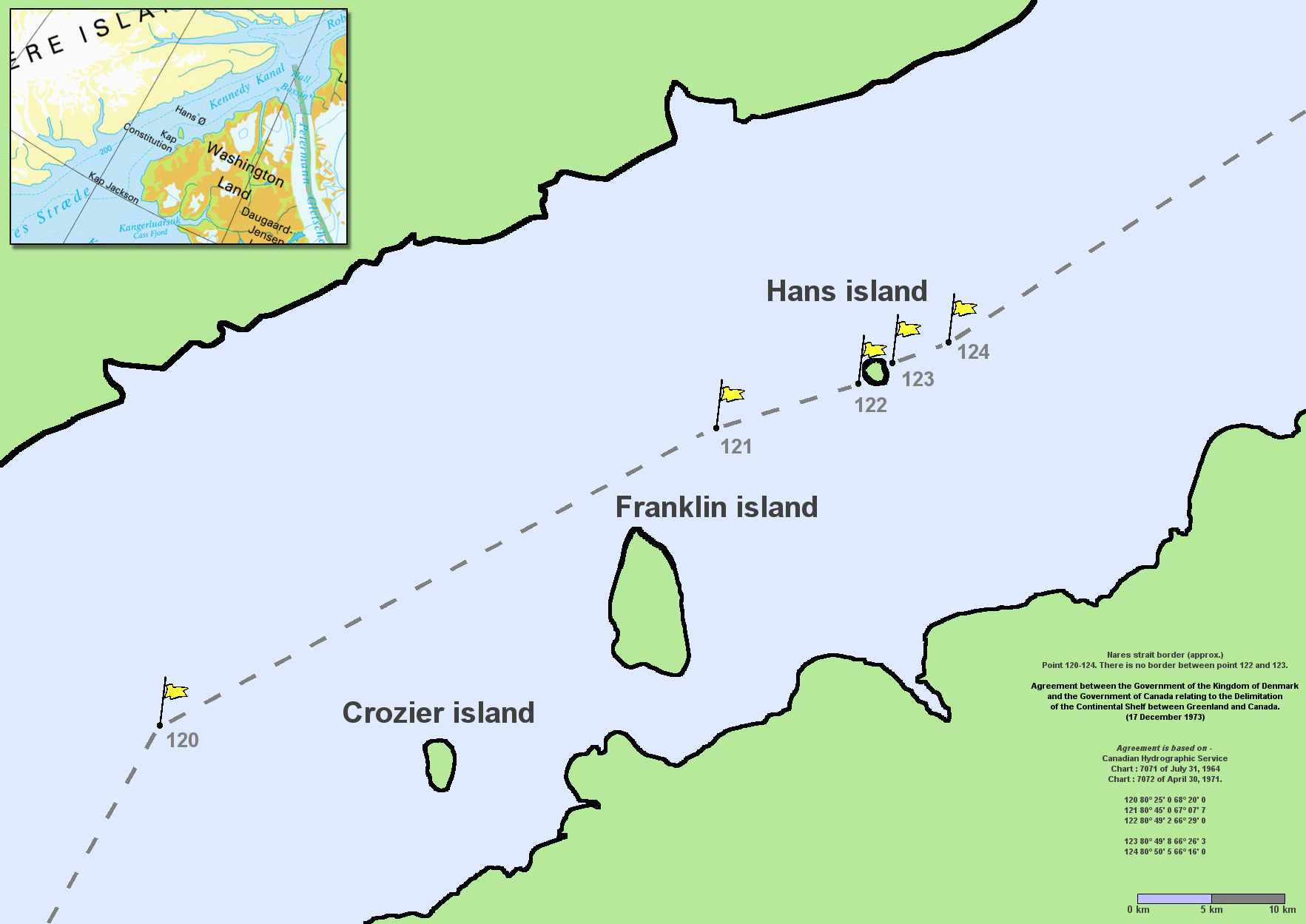
- Map of Franklin Island south east of the Canadian border in the Kennedy Channel

- Location of Franklin Island in Greenland
- Interactive map of Franklin Island
- Etymology: Named after John Franklin

Geography
- Location: Kennedy Channel
- Coordinates: 80°38′N 66°48′W
- Adjacent to: Nares Strait
- Area: 33.7 km^{2} (13.0 sq mi)
- Length: 9.8 km (6.09 mi)
- Width: 4.7 km (2.92 mi)
- Highest elevation: 215 m (705 ft)

Administration
- Greenland
- Municipality: Avannaata

Demographics
- Population: 0 (2023)
- Pop. density: 0/km^{2} (0/sq mi)
- Ethnic groups: none

Franklin Island (Danish: Franklin Ø) is one of three islands located in Kennedy Channel of the Nares Strait in the high Arctic and is part of Avannaata municipality, Greenland.

== Geography ==
Franklin Island is the largest of a group of three islands off the Washington Land coast that includes Crozier Island and Hans Island as well. The former is also part of Greenland, whilst the latter's ownership is shared between Denmark and Canada.

It is located c. 3 miles (4.8 km) north of Cape Constitution (Danish: Kap Constitution). It is predominantly light brown in colour, very steep-sided, flat topped, and rises to a height of 215 m (705 ft) on the Southeast side.

The island is named after the British explorer John Franklin (1786–1847), by Elisha Kent Kane between 1854 and 1855 during his second Grinnell Expedition, after it was sighted by Hans Hendrik and the American William Morton in June 1854. Canada and Denmark also left their flags along with whiskey and other alcoholic drinks.

== See also ==
- List of islands of Greenland
