= Hans Island =

Island shared by Canada and Denmark

Native name: Tartupaluk (Inuktitut and Greenlandic); ᑕᕐᑐᐸᓗᒃ (Inuktitut syllabics); Hans Ø (Danish); Île Hans (French)
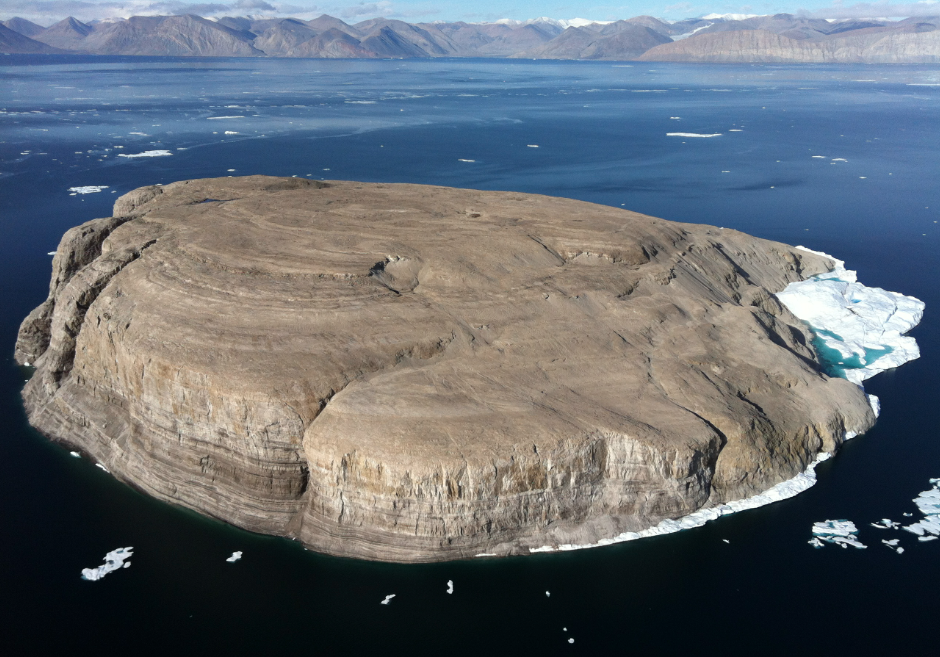
- Hans Island from the east (Greenlandic) side, with Ellesmere Island in the distance

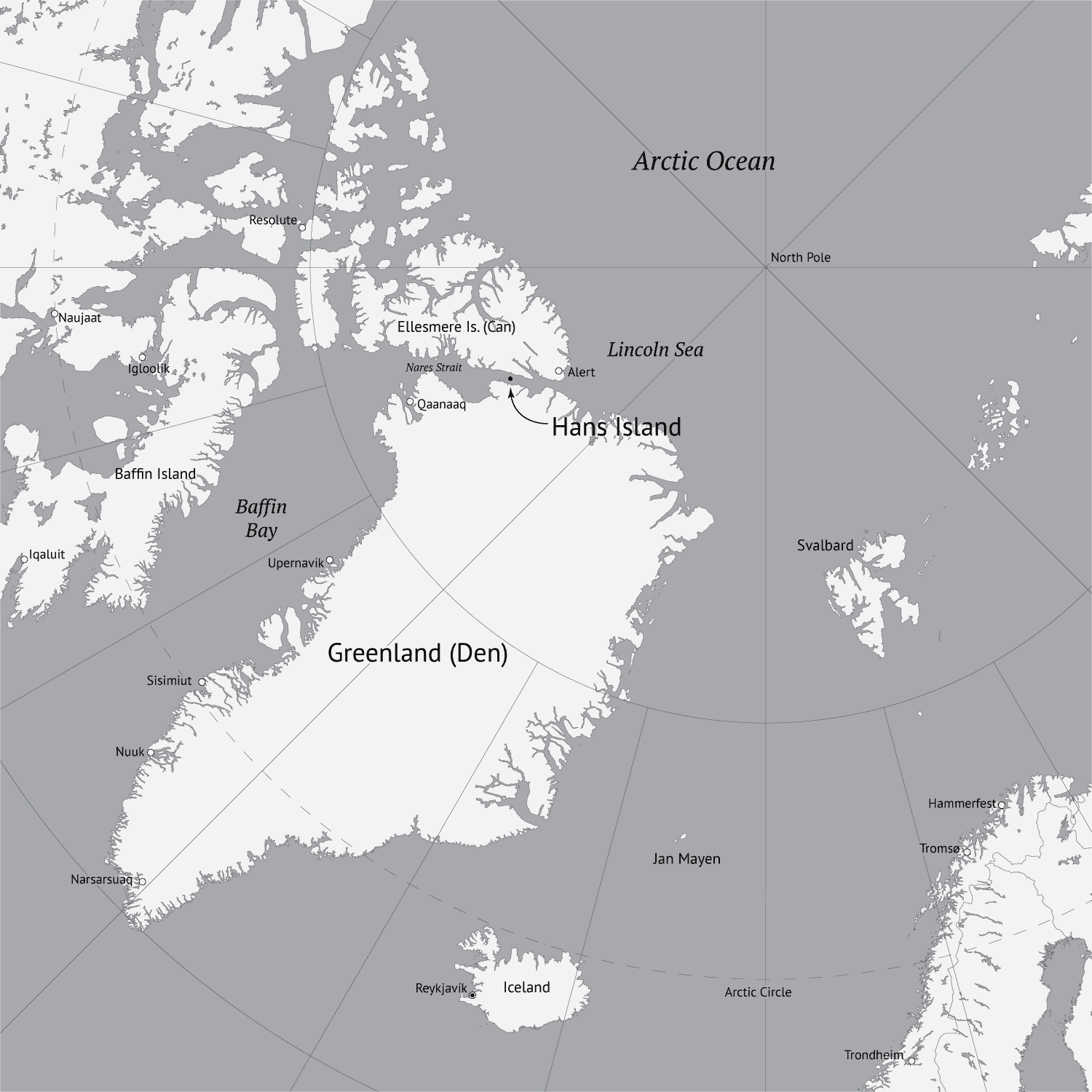
- Location of Hans Island, between Greenland and Ellesmere Island

- Location within Nunavut Location within Greenland
- Interactive map of Hans Island

Geography
- Coordinates: 80°49′35″N 66°27′30″W
- Area: 1.3 km^{2} (0.50 sq mi)
- Length: 1,290 m (4230 ft)
- Width: 1,199 m (3934 ft)
- Highest elevation: 168 m (551 ft)

Administration
- Canada
- Territory: Nunavut
- Region: Qikiqtaaluk
- King of Canada; Prime Minister of Canada: Charles III; Mark Carney
- Danish Realm
- Autonomous territory: Greenland
- Municipality: Avannaata
- King of Denmark; Prime Minister of Greenland; Prime Minister of Denmark: Frederik X; Jens-Frederik Nielsen; Mette Frederiksen

Demographics
- Population: Uninhabited (2026)

Additional information
- Time zones: EST (UTC−5); WGT (UTC−2)
  - Summer (DST): EDT (UTC−4); WGST (UTC−1)

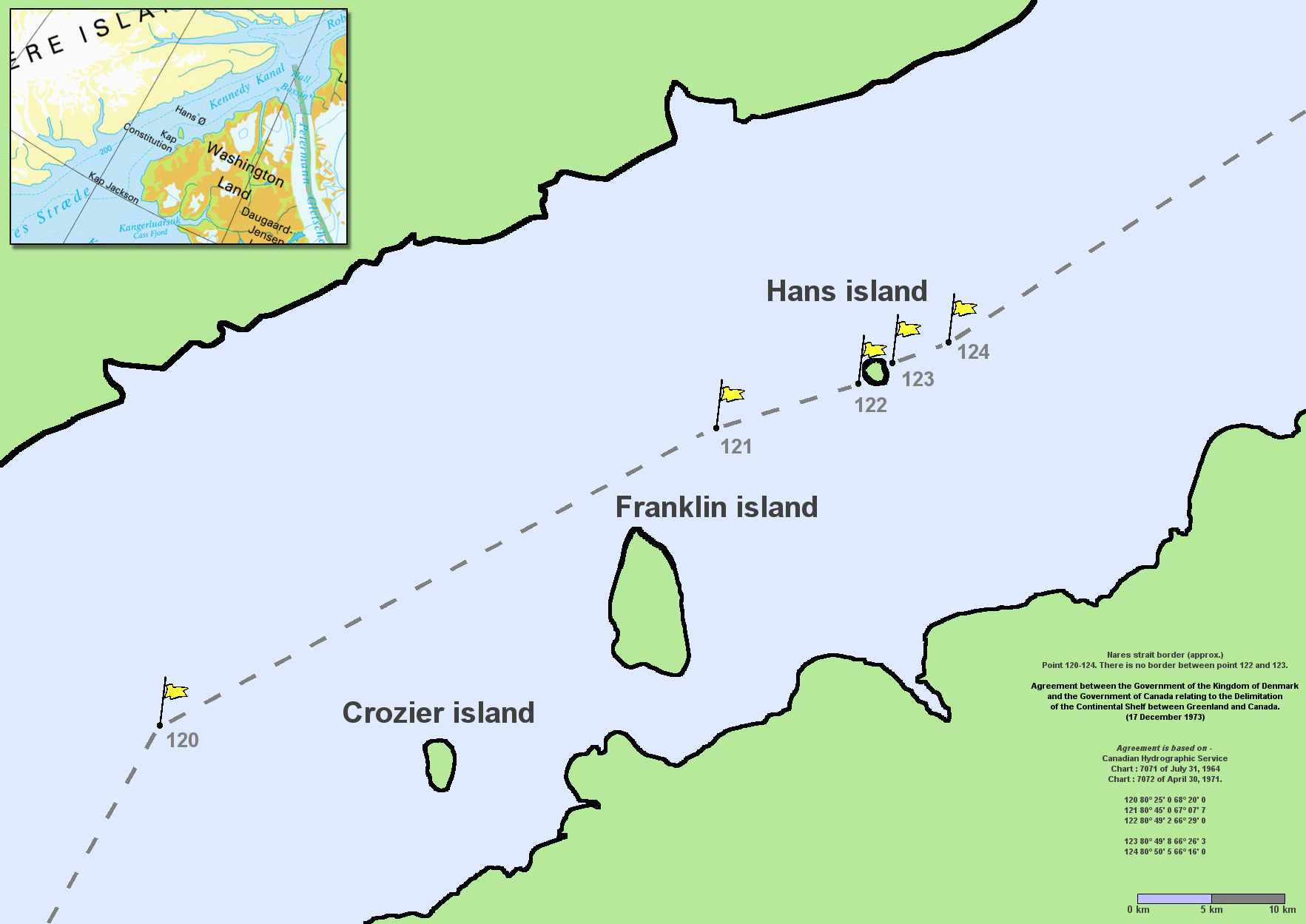
Map of part of Kennedy Channel, with Hans Island

Hans Island (Inuktitut and Greenlandic: Tartupaluk, lit. 'kidney shaped'; Inuktitut syllabics: ᑕᕐᑐᐸᓗᒃ; Danish: Hans Ø, pronounced [hanˀs øˀ]; French: île Hans, pronounced [il ɑ̃(n)s]) is an island in the centre of the Kennedy Channel of the Nares Strait in the high Arctic region, split between the Canadian territory of Nunavut and the Danish rigsdel (autonomous territory) of Greenland.

The island itself is barren and uninhabited with an area of 130 ha (320 acres), measuring 1,290 by 1,199 m (4,232 by 3,934 ft), and a maximum elevation of 168.17 m (551.7 ft). Its location in the strait that separates Ellesmere Island of Canada from northern Greenland was for years a border dispute, the so-called Whisky War between the two sovereign states of Canada and the Danish Realm, officially the Kingdom of Denmark. Hans Island is the smallest of three islands in Kennedy Channel off the Washington Land coast; the others are Franklin Island and Crozier Island. The strait at this point is 35 km (22 mi) wide, placing the island within the territorial waters of both Canada and the Danish Realm (Greenland). A 1,280 m (4,200 ft) shared border traverses the island.

The island has likely been part of Inuit hunting grounds since the 14th century. It was claimed by both Canada and Denmark until 14 June 2022, when both countries agreed to split the disputed island roughly in half. In accordance with the Greenland home rule treaty, Denmark handles certain foreign affairs, such as border disputes, on behalf of the entire Danish Realm.

== Geology ==
As determined by field investigations and the interpretation of satellite image maps and monochrome stereoscopic air photographs, the exposed portion of Hans Island consists of 195 m (640 ft) of Silurian limestone. From its summit to sea level, it consists of an upper 60 m (200 ft) thick yellowish brown to grey megalodont bivalve and stromatoporoid limestone; a 10–12 m (33–39 ft) thick pale yellowish brown to pale grey marker bed; and a 125 m (410 ft) thick yellowish brown to brownish grey weathering, locally cliff-forming, coral, megalodont bivalve and stromatoporoid limestone. These strata are assigned to the uppermost carbonate buildup facies of the Allen Bay Formation of Canada and part of the Kap Morton Formation of Washington Land, Greenland.

The limestone of Hans Island are underlain by Lower Cambrian to middle Silurian strata that are at least 3,300 m (10,800 ft) thick. These sedimentary strata underlying Washington Land, Hans Island and most of subsurface Kennedy Channel are undeformed with a northwesterly dip of 1 to 3 degrees. They contain source rocks that may have been heated enough to have generated significant amounts of oil and gas. However, these strata lack the geological structures and facies changes capable of trapping these hydrocarbons and forming commercial-size petroleum reservoirs.

The surface of Hans Island is covered by a veneer of unconsolidated glacial sediment. These sediments consist of a mixture of gravel, mud and boulders that form a discontinuous till veneer on its limestone surface over much of the island with the exception of its coastal cliffs and part of the intertidal zone. The gravel consists of angular to subrounded (kidney-shaped) limestone clasts and large erratics of red granites and granitoid and garnet gneisses.

This surface also exhibits erosional features indicative of the streaming of an ice sheet through Kennedy Channel. These glacial features include glacial striations on bedrock; glacially-polished bedrock; linear-aligned crescentic fractures; sickle-shaped, comma-form, and longitudinal grooves and furrows. In addition, linear glacial flutes and ridges can be mapped from aerial photography and profile of the island also has a stream-lined form suggestive of glacial sculpting.

== Etymology ==
The island is named after Hans Hendrik, whose native Greenlandic name was Suersaq. Hendrik was an Arctic traveller and translator who worked on the American and British Arctic expeditions of Elisha Kent Kane (Second Grinnell expedition), Charles Francis Hall, Isaac Israel Hayes and George Strong Nares, from 1853 to 1876.

Prior to 2005, the island was thought to have been named during Charles Francis Hall's third Arctic voyage, the Polaris expedition, between 1871 and 1873. The first written reference to the name and the island itself appears in Charles Henry Davis's book Narrative of the North Polar expedition (1876), which is a narrative of Hall's fatal North Pole expedition. On page 407 it appears, without any previous mention. The island made its first cartographic appearance on a map accompanying the book.

Charles Henry Davis writes,

The ship was tied to a large floe, and drifted slowly down the channel with the pack; about noon, she was quite near Hans Island and west of it. The latitude by observation was 80°48′ N; longitude 68°38′ W. The ship continued to drift, and at 7 p.m. was midway between Hans and Franklin Island, which are ten miles. (Note: Hans and Franklin are 19 km (12 mi) from each other, so it is likely that Davis meant nautical miles, 10 nmi (19 km; 12 mi) distant from each other. Soundings were taken at a depth of 203 fathoms (371 m; 1,218 ft), with a bottom of black limestone.)

He was referring to the ship Polaris's return voyage southward down the Kennedy Channel. This does not answer when it was named. The ship's doctor and leader of the scientific part of the expedition, Emil Bessels, mentioned the island in his own book, Die amerikanische Nordpol-Expedition (1879). He tells that on 29 August 1871, on the voyage north through Kennedy Channel, the Polaris sailed between Grinnell-Land (Ellesmere Island) and a small island "which was named Hans Island" (German: welches Hans-Insel genannt wurde), without further explanation of the name.

An earlier mention of a Hans Island expedition is in Elisha Kent Kane's account of the Second Grinnell expedition, Arctic Explorations: The Second Grinnell Expedition, 1853, ’54, ’55, (published 1857), in pages 317–319. Thus the year 1853 is now often cited as the date of the first European discovery and naming of the island, including in a letter by the Danish Ambassador to Canada in the Ottawa Citizen on 28 July 2005.

We now neared the Littleton Island of Captain Inglefield where a piece of good fortune awaited us. We saw a number of ducks, both eiders and hareldas; and it occurred to me that by tracking their flight we should reach their breeding-grounds. There was no trouble in doing so, for they flew in a bee-line to a group of rocky islets, ... A rugged little ledge, which I named Eider Island, was so thickly colonized that we could hardly walk without treading on a nest ... Nearby was a low and isolated rock-ledge, which we called Hans Island. The glaucous gulls, those cormorants of the Arctic seas, had made it their peculiar homestead.

Littleton Island (Greenlandic: Pikiuleq) is approximately 1 km (0.62 mi) from Greenland's coast, right in Smith Sound. It is about 300 km (190 mi) south of the island today called Hans Island. Around it and the coast of Greenland lay dozens of tiny islands, and Kane named one of them Hans Island after Hans Hendrik, the native Greenlandic helper he had with him on the trip. That this is the current Littleton Island is confirmed by Kane mentioning Edward Augustus Inglefield, who named Littleton Island.

The names of many places in this region have changed or been altered during the last 100 years. For example, the name of Nares Strait (named after George Strong Nares), separating Ellesmere Island and northern Greenland, was not agreed upon between the Danish and Canadian governments until 1964.

== History and disputed sovereignty ==
The conflict over the island, known as the Whisky War, has been described as "the friendliest war" and "one of the most passive-aggressive boundary disputes in history".

=== Early history ===
Inuit living in northern Greenland or Canada would have known the island for centuries. In the mid 19th century, Nares Strait was likely unknown to Europeans. It is not known whether Norsemen visited the island in the centuries when Greenland was inhabited by them, although an iron lance blade was recovered at Fossil Bay in Washington Land that could potentially be of Norse origin.

From 1850 to 1880, the area in which Hans Island is situated was explored by American and British expeditions. These expeditions were a response partly due to the popular search for the missing British explorer Sir John Franklin and his crew, and partly to search for the elusive Northwest Passage and/or reach the North Pole.

The Danish "Celebration Expedition" of 1920 to 1923 accurately mapped the whole region of the northern Greenland coast from Cape York (Perlernerit, Kap York) to Danmark Fjord (Danmarksfjorden).

In 1933, the Permanent Court of International Justice declared the legal status of Greenland in favour of Denmark. Denmark claims geological evidence points to Hans Island being part of Greenland, and therefore it belongs to Denmark by extension of the Court's ruling.

Since the 1960s, numerous surveys have been undertaken in the Nares Strait region, including seismic, ice flow, mapping, archaeological and economic surveys. Canadian-based Dome Petroleum made surveys on and around Hans Island from 1980 to 1983, to investigate the movement of ice masses.

=== 1972–73 border treaty ===
In 1972, a team consisting of personnel from the Canadian Hydrographic Service and Danish personnel working in the Nares Strait determined the geographic coordinates for Hans Island. During negotiations between Canada and the Danish Realm on their maritime boundary in 1973, both states claimed Hans Island was part of their territory. No agreement was reached between the two governments on the issue.

The maritime boundary immediately north and south of Hans Island was established in the continental shelf treaty ratified by Denmark and Canada and then submitted to the United Nations on 17 December 1973, in force since 13 March 1974. At the time, it was the longest shelf boundary treaty ever negotiated and may have been the first ever continental shelf boundary developed by a computer.

The Government of the Kingdom of Denmark and the Government of Canada, having decided to establish in the area between Greenland and the Canadian Arctic Islands a dividing line beyond which neither Party exercising its rights under the Convention on the Continental Shelf of April/29/1958 will extend its sovereign rights for the purpose of exploration and exploitation of the natural resources of the continental shelf…

The treaty lists 127 points (latitude and longitude) from Davis Strait to the end of Robeson Channel, where the Nares Strait runs into the Lincoln Sea, to draw geodesic lines between, to form the border. The treaty does not, however, draw a line from point 122 (80°49′12″N 66°29′00″W) to point 123 (80°49′48″N 66°26′18″W), a distance of 1,370 m (4,490 ft), because Hans Island is situated in between those two points.

=== Joint administration ===
In 1984, Iqaluit-based Kenn Harper, a historian and writer for Nunatsiaq News, wrote an article about Hans Island. It was printed in Hainang, a local newspaper in Qaanaaq in northwestern Greenland. This article was picked up by a Danish newspaper in Copenhagen and by CBC Radio in Canada.

This article was sparked because of a chance encounter on the ice near Resolute, in the Canadian Arctic in the autumn of 1983. According to Harper, he met a man wearing a hat with bold capitals around the side of the hat saying "Hans Island, N.W.T." This man was a scientist with Dome Petroleum who had just spent the summer on the island doing ice research. Dome Petroleum did research on and around the island from 1980 to 1983.

Simultaneously, the Danish and Canadian governments were in the process of signing a cooperation agreement in relation to the marine environment in the Nares Strait. The agreement was signed and put into force on 26 August 1983. The Agreement addresses protection of the marine environment of the waters lying between Canada and Greenland, particularly with respect to preparedness measures as a contingency against pollution incidents resulting from offshore hydrocarbon exploration or exploitation and from shipping activities that may affect the marine environment.

One of the items also discussed was the possibility of establishing a reciprocal arrangement for processing applications to conduct research on and around Hans Island. This was never signed; however, Canadian John Munro, at the time Minister of Indian Affairs and Northern Development, and Dane Tom Høyem, at the time Minister for Greenland, agreed, in common interest, to avoid acts that might prejudice future negotiations.

However, unknown to the politicians, Dome Petroleum was doing research on the island.

In 1984, the Danish Minister for Greenland planted the Danish flag on the island and left a little message saying "Velkommen til den danske ø (English: Welcome to the Danish island). It is also said he left a bottle of brandy; this seems to have been Schnapps, a traditional Danish spirit. It is commonly told, internally in the Royal Danish Navy, that it was specifically a bottle of Gammel Dansk, which translates literally to 'Old Danish'. The Canadians have reciprocated with their own sign, the flag of Canada and a bottle of Canadian Club.

=== Media attention and continuing negotiations ===
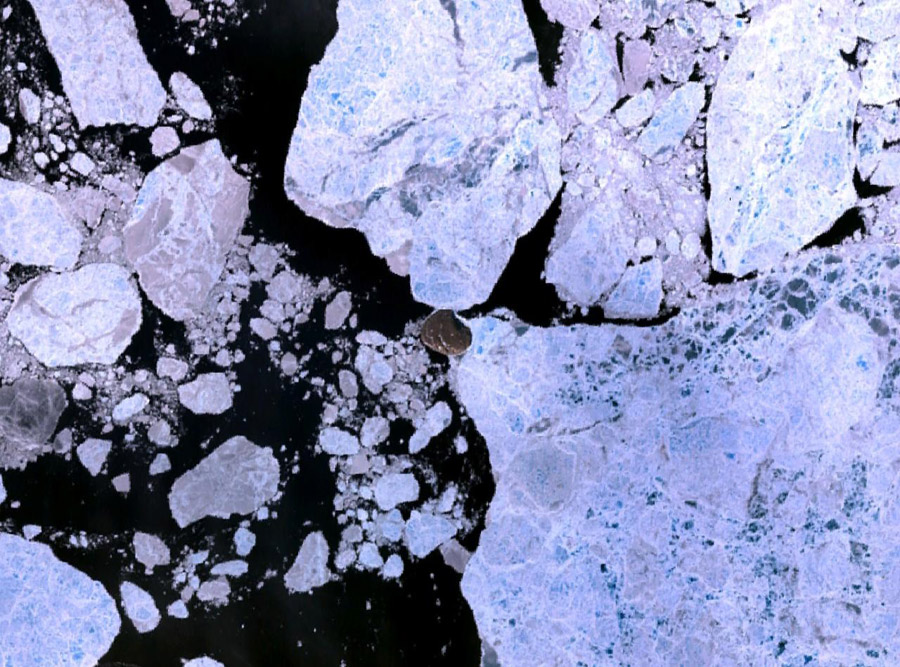
Hans Island, NASA Landsat 7 image

Though CBC and others had done some reporting in the 1980s, the dispute came to popular attention through Canadian press stories during late March 2004. Within days, it spread to other newspapers worldwide.

On 25 March 2004, when Adrian Humphreys of the Canadian National Post newspaper wrote an article entitled "Five-year plan to 'put footprints in the snow' and assert northern sovereignty", Humphreys made a brief mention of the dispute over Hans Island, and that the Danes had sent warships to the island.

The Arctic sea region has long been a subject of dispute. In this matter, Canada, Denmark, Iceland, Russia, and Norway share an interest in establishing parts of the Arctic seas as "national waters". The United States and most European Union countries, on the other hand, officially regard the region as international waters. Further items in the Canadian media led to the issue being picked up by international news organizations.

The 2004 Canadian budget was introduced on 23 March 2004, by the government of Canada, two days before the issue gained widespread attention. It proposed minimal increases to spending on national defence. The issue of Hans Island was raised in the Canadian Parliament by opposition foreign affairs critic Stockwell Day to highlight the government's failure to provide more funding for the military.

A news article by Adrian Humphreys on 30 March 2004, also in the National Post, entitled "Danes summon envoy over Arctic fight—the solution of the dispute is not going to be military", drew even more attention to the issue. The article claimed Brian Herman, Canada's only diplomat in Denmark (ambassador Alfonso Gagliano having been recently recalled as a result of an unrelated Canadian scandal), was called before the Danish Ministry of Foreign Affairs, to comment about his country's intentions in the dispute, which had, according to the article, recently been inflamed by Danish sailors occupying Hans Island.

Hans Island, 1990 US Government operational navigation chart

On 31 March 2004, the Danish and Canadian governments denied Herman or any other Canadian official was summoned to the Danish Ministry of Foreign Affairs. Both governments stated the dispute was a long-standing issue, and nothing had changed in the matter.

A Canadian military exercise, named "Narwhal 04", inflamed the issue further. However, this exercise had been in the planning stage since September 2003, and it took place around Pangnirtung on Baffin Island, 2,000 km (1,200 mi) south of Hans Island. The Canadian military denied the exercise had anything to do with the Danish–Canadian territorial dispute. The exercise took place from 9 to 30 August 2004, involving about 160 soldiers from the army, various aircraft, helicopters and one frigate, HMCS Montréal. About 600 Canadian Forces personnel were involved in total.

A new development came to light after Canadian Defence Minister Bill Graham visited the island on 20 July 2005. Peter Taksøe-Jensen, the head of the international law department at Denmark's foreign ministry, said the following in an interview with Reuters on 25 July in response to the event:

We consider Hans Island to be part of Danish territory and will therefore hand over a complaint about the Canadian minister's unannounced visit.

— Peter Taksøe-Jensen, Danish Foreign Office

On 18 August 2005, Canadian frigate HMCS Fredericton left Halifax, Nova Scotia, for an Arctic cruise. Canadian officials said the month-long patrol was unrelated to the Hans Island dispute. HMCS Glace Bay and HMCS Shawinigan, both Kingston-class coastal defence vessels, were also scheduled to patrol the Arctic in 2005.

In July 2007, owing to updated satellite imagery, Canadian authorities realized the line constructed as a basis for the maritime boundary (but not for land) would have run roughly across the middle of the island, but the boundary did not "move" as that required a bilateral agreement by the two states for which negotiations continued.

The two countries maintained a sense of humour in the dispute. Peter Taksøe-Jensen stated "when Danish military go there, they leave a bottle of schnapps. And when Canadian military forces come there, they leave a bottle of Canadian Club and a sign saying, 'Welcome to Canada.'"

Negotiations began in 2012 between Canada and Denmark, calling for either a condominium or splitting the disputed island's sovereignty in half.

On 23 May 2018, Canada and Denmark announced the creation of a Joint Task Force to determine the boundary between Canada and Greenland, including the fate of Hans Island.

==== Google fight ====
"Google fight" or "Google war" is the name given to a number of advertisements on the Internet search engine Google which promoted either Danish or Canadian sovereignty over Hans Island in 2005.

In July 2005, a Canadian author said that he saw an advertisement on Google stating that the island was part of Denmark, along with a link to a Danish Foreign Ministry page with a copy of the diplomatic protest that had been sent after Canada's defence minister had visited the island. Denmark's ambassador to Canada said that the Danish government had not been involved in any advertisement about the island and whoever placed it was acting alone. In response, the Canadian author ordered his own advertisement stating that the island belongs to Canada, along with a link to a page with a rotating Canadian flag and the Canadian national anthem. Similar to the actual dispute, the "Google fight" was considered quite harmless and treated as entertainment by the media, with the Canadian Foreign Affairs Ministry responding that they – as a goodwill gesture to Denmark – still would allow Danish pastries to be sold in the ministry cafeteria.

=== Resolution ===
Canada–Denmark border Canada–Greenland border
- The international border on Hans Island after the 2022 treaty. The balance is 40% Canada (western portion) and 60% Greenland/Denmark (eastern portion).

Characteristics
- Entities: Canada Denmark
- Length: 1,280 m (4,200 ft)

History
- Established: 14 June 2022; Resolution to the Whisky War

On 11 June 2022, the Danish, Greenlandic, Canadian, and Nunavut governments agreed to split Hans Island in half after 17 years of negotiations. On 14 June 2022, Canadian Foreign Affairs Minister Mélanie Joly, Danish foreign affairs minister Jeppe Kofod, and prime minister of Greenland Múte Bourup Egede signed an agreement to divide the island nearly in half along a natural fault line. The treaty was ratified by the Folketing (Parliament of Denmark) on 19 December 2023. By this, Canada and the Danish Realm, through Greenland, have an international land border of 1,280 m (4,200 ft), which follows a rift, forming a half circle with the westernmost part around the middle, in the surface of the island that runs from north to south near the centre of the island. The agreement was cited as an example of a peaceful resolution to a border conflict shortly after the Russian invasion of Ukraine. The island contains the fourth shortest land border between countries, and also a second land neighbour for Canada and for the Danish Realm, each of which had only one, with the United States and Germany respectively. It also is the northernmost international land border in the world, as well as the third land border between countries of Europe and of the Americas, the other two being between French Guiana and the South American countries Brazil and Suriname.

=== The new border according to the treaty and laws ===
The Danish law to establish the land border and the sea border between the Danish Realm and Canada was put before the Danish parliament on 5 October 2023. The final Danish parliament decision came 19 December 2023. The comments to the law contains (point 1.3) a principle to allow people who enter Hans Island for official matters or tourism to visit the entire island without border control. No border control will be established on Hans Island.

The treaty (written in English, French, Danish and Greenlandic) mentions three border points on land, and 149 border points in the sea, with straight lines in between. The land points are:

- Point T1: 80° 49′ 17.2″ N 66° 27′ 02.4″ W
- Point T2: 80° 49′ 33.1″ N 66° 27′ 52.3″ W
- Point T3: 80° 49′ 54.6″ N 66° 27′ 24.0″ W

== See also ==
- List of divided islands
- List of islands of Canada
- List of islands of Greenland
- Operation Hurricane (Canada)
- Beaumont Island (Greenland)

== Sources ==
- United Nations: Delimitation Treaties. Agreement between the Government of the Kingdom of Denmark and the Government of Canada relating to the Delimitation of the Continental Shelf between Greenland and Canada, 17 December 1973,
- United States Department of State: Bureau of Intelligence and Research Limits in the Seas No. 72 Continental shelf Boundary: Canada – Greenland, Issued by the Geographer, 4 August 1976.
- Agreement between the Government of Canada and the Kingdom of Denmark for Cooperation relating to the Marine Environment, 26 August 1983.
- Narrative of the North Polar expedition : U.S Ship Polaris, Captain Charles Francis Hall commanding, edited under the direction of G. M. Robeson by C. H. Davis. Washington, G. P. O., 1876.
