= Edith Julia Griswold =

American patent attorney (1863–1926)

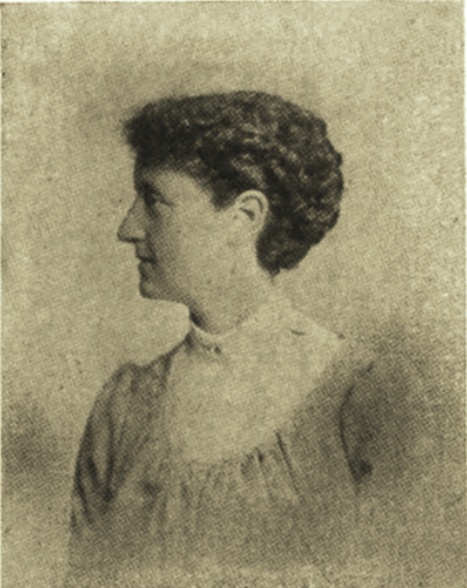
- Born: February 12, 1863; Windsor, Connecticut, U.S.
- Died: February 9, 1926 (aged 62); Dobbs Ferry, New York, U.S.
- Education: New York University School of Law
- Occupation: patent attorney

Edith Julia Griswold (February 12, 1863 – February 9, 1926) was an American patent attorney. In her day, Griswold was the only woman patent expert. Her expert work which came from other patent lawyers was, with but one exception, confined to patents relating to articles used or worn by women. Her legal advising included patents, trademarks, and copyright matters.

== Early life and education ==
Edith Julia Griswold was born in Windsor, Connecticut, February 12, 1863. Her parents were Thomas Newell Griswold (1831-1905) and Cornelia Stanley (Babcock) Griswold. She was a descendant of Edward Griswold, who came from Kenilworth, Warwick District, England, in 1635, and settled in Windsor, Connecticut. Through her mother, too, she traced a long line of New England ancestry. Her father was the owner of the first Windsor Hotel, a notable hostelry of the Civil War era.

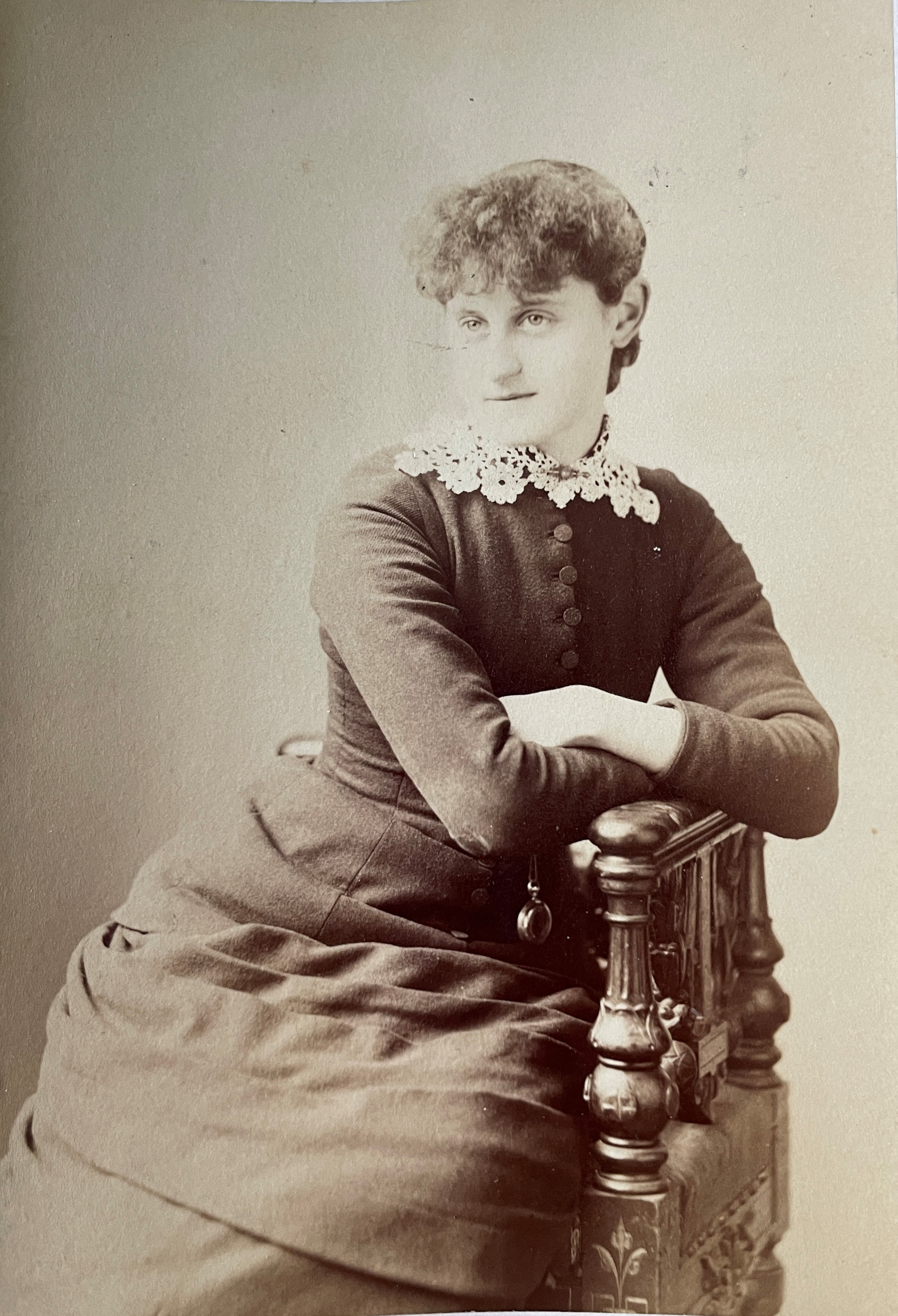
Portrait taken in the Sarony Studio in Union Square, NY.

Griswold and her older sister began their education at the Windsor Academy for Young Ladies. (Note: A younger sister died at the age of three.) In 1869, the Windsor Hotel burned and the family moved to New York City where Edith attended Public School No. 47, from which she was graduated in 1879. Then followed four years at the New York Normal College (now Hunter College), graduating in 1883 with a license to teach in the New York schools. But there was at that time a special course at the Normal College in electricity. she was fascinated by the subject and her father told her to go ahead. she gained a great deal from the course and considered that, although she grew into practice of law without any particular leaning that way, her best work was always along electrical lines. thinking it was not right to allow her father to support her further, Griswold went into business.

This was followed by private studies in civil and mechanical engineering, 1884–86.

== Career ==
In 1884, she began as a mechanical drafter and with the exception of work with Daniel J. Miller, one of the first cable railroad men, in whose office she had practice with working drawings and estimating costs for cable railroad in 1885 and 1886, her work was patent-office drawing. At the same, during the winter of 1885–86, Griswold taught geometry and mathematics in a private school in New York.

In 1886, she opened an office at 234 Broadway, Manhattan (where the Woolworth Building now stands), as a mechanical drafter. In 1887, she closed up this office, and through 1897, was connected with the patent law firm of Howson & Howson, first as draftsman and later becoming a managing clerk. She also attended lectures at the New York University School of Law.

In 1897, Griswold left the firm of patent lawyers to open her own office in the St. Paul Building, as a patent attorney. She was admitted to New York Bar, June 28, 1898, and the U.S. Circuit courts, July 1, 1901. After becoming successful as a patent-attorney, she turned most of the office work over to a partner, and from 1901, confined herself in the main to appearing as an expert witness in patent disputes. Although obliged to give up active office work in 1905, on account of ill health, she continued, at her home, the "expert work", for which her knowledge and experience were in great demand. She kept her office in the St. Paul Building until 1908.

In 1904, she was a member of the International Jury of Awards in the Machinery Department of the Louisiana Purchase Exposition, St. Louis, Missouri.

The first meeting of the Women Lawyers' Club (now National Association of Women Lawyers) was held in Griswold's office in 1899. She served as the organization's president from 1912 to 1914. She was a co-founder, Associate Editor, and writer of its organ, the Women Lawyers' Journal. During this time, she made her home at Hastings-on-Hudson, New York. She was also an occasional writer for other magazines.

Her interests included psychology, Theosophy, and metaphysics. She began to study psychology while in the Normal College and kept it up thereafter. She regarded it as the most important factor in her life, and that it had a great influence on her work. In later years, Griswold took up the study of Henri Bergson's philosophy with a group of friends. To furnish this group of students with textbooks, Griswold wrote a series of booklets showing the trend of the new philosophy of this former professor of philosophy in the College of France. she also wrote articles to show what it means to be "one with the Father" and "led by the Spirit". After these articles were written, she resolved to print them herself. She bought a small printing press and type and learned the art by herself. She printed, and bound four booklets, limiting the edition to the hundred copies numbered and autographed by herself. They were entitled, A Study of Life. She included in these pamphlets the philosophy of Bergson and the psychology of William James.

== Personal life ==
In religion, Griswold was affiliated with New Thought. She favored woman suffrage.

Edith Julia Griswold died at Dobbs Ferry, New York, February 9, 1926.
