= William H. H. Crosier =

Union Army soldier (1844–1903), Medal of Honor recipient

- Born: May 5, 1844; Skaneateles, New York
- Died: March 14, 1903 (aged 58); New York
- Burial place: Oakwood Cemetery; Syracuse, New York
- Military career
- Allegiance: United States of America
- Branch: United States Army
- Rank: Sergeant
- Unit: (New York (state)) 149th New York Volunteer Infantry - Company G
- Awards: Medal of Honor

Sergeant William Henry Harrison Crosier (May 5, 1844 – March 14, 1903) was an American soldier who fought in the American Civil War. Crosier received the country's highest award for bravery during combat, the Medal of Honor, for his action during the Battle of Peachtree Creek in Georgia on July 20, 1864. He was honored with the award on January 12, 1892.

== Biography ==
Crosier was born in Skaneateles, New York on May 5, 1844. He enlisted into the 149th New York Infantry. He died on March 14, 1903, and his remains are interred at Oakwood Cemetery in Syracuse.

== Medal of Honor citation ==
Severely wounded and ambushed by the enemy, he stripped the colors from the staff and brought them back into the line.

== See also ==
- List of American Civil War Medal of Honor recipients: A–F
