= Ray Crozier =

Australian rules footballer (1930–2015)

Personal information
- Full name: Raymond James Crozier
- Born: 25 August 1930
- Died: 22 September 2015 (aged 85)
- Original team: Morwell
- Height: 183 cm (6 ft 0 in)
- Weight: 73 kg (161 lb)

Playing career^{1}
Years	Club	Games (Goals)
1952	Footscray	1 (0)
- ^{1} Playing statistics correct to the end of 1952.

Ray Crozier (25 August 1930 – 22 September 2015) was an Australian rules footballer who played with Footscray in the Victorian Football League (VFL).
