= Oscar Crozier =

American planter and politician from Louisiana (c.1843–c.1893)

Louisiana State Senate
- In office 1874–1875

Personal details
- Born: c. 1843
- Party: Republican

Oscar Crozier (c.1843–c.1893) was an American sugar planter and state legislator who served in the Louisiana State Senate during the Reconstruction era from 1874 until 1875.

== Biography ==
Crozier was born circa 1843 and was a sugar planter from Lafourche Parish, Louisiana.

In 1869 he was appointed as an assessor for the U.S. Internal Revenue for the Lafourche Parish, and in 1870 he was appointed alderman of Thibodaux, Louisiana by Governor Henry C. Warmoth.

Crozier was a Republican, spoke at republican meetings and was elected as delegate for multiple conventions. He was elected as a delegate to the state convention August 6, 1870 along with Albert J. Brooks. In July 1871 he was elected to be a delegate at the August state convention along with William Murrell, where he was made vice president and was appointed to the executive committee for the state. He was elected along with William Murrell to again be a delegate in the following years republican state convention in August 1872.

Governor Warmoth nominated Crozier as the tax collector for Lafourche Parish in 1872, a job he was still performing in 1877. The same year Crozier as president of the Lafourche School Board noted that the parish had 1100 pupils in public schooling.

In 1874 he was nominated again to be a delegate for the state convention but was also nominated to run for senator for the eighth senatorial district. He was narrowly elected to serve in the Louisiana State Senate beating the democratic candidate by 4441 to 4395 and he only served until April 1875 when he was removed from that office due to the Wheeler Compromise for the resolution of the 1874 election disputes.

Crozier remained active in parish politics into the 1890s still attending republic state conventions until at least 1892.

He died sometime before February 1896 when his mother, Clarisse, died after fatally burning herself after setting her dress on fire whilst using coal oil to light a fire.

== See also ==
- African American officeholders from the end of the Civil War until before 1900
