= Judson S. Siler =

American politician (1863–1942)

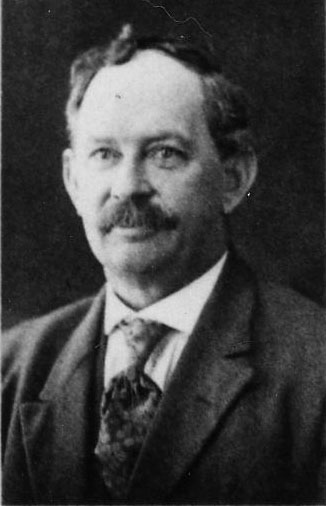
- Siler in 1917

Member of the Washington House of Representatives for the 27th district
- In office 1913–1921; 1923–1929

Personal details
- Born: June 14, 1863 Franklin County, North Carolina, United States
- Died: June 7, 1942 (aged 78) Centralia, Washington, United States
- Party: Republican

Judson Swain Siler (June 14, 1863 – June 7, 1942) was an American politician who served in the Washington House of Representatives from 1913 to 1921 and 1923 to 1929.
