= Texana A. Castle =

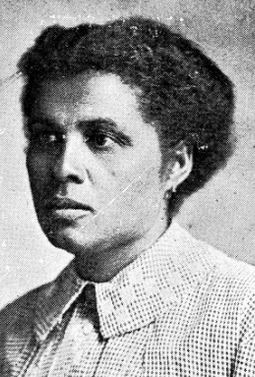
- Born: 1865; Texas
- Died: 1930 (aged 66–67); Texas
- Other names: T. A. Castles, Texana Childress
- Occupations: social worker, missionary
- Years active: 1906-1921
- Known for: founding the Bryan Colored Rescue Home

Texana A. Castle (née Childress; 1863-1930) was an African-American Baptist, who lived in Bryan, Texas for most of her life. She was affiliated with Baptist missionary projects and founded the Bryans Colored Rescue Home in the mostly African-American community of Boonville, Texas.

== Early life ==
Texana A. Childress was born in March 1863 in Texas. Little is known of her early life, other than that she had a brother, J. L. Sample, who also lived in the Cottonwood area near Bryan, Texas. She could read and write, but had not attended school. On May 2, 1885 in Bryan, Childress married Jefferson D. Castle, (1855-1940) who had been a slave in Louisiana before moving to Brazos County, Texas and becoming a prominent landholder. The couple had 12 children, but only 6 were living by the 1910 census.

== Career ==
In 1905 there was a call from the African-American community in Bryan to build an industrial school and colored orphans home. In the early part of the following year, the "Fathers and Mothers Protection Society", founded by Castle and located in Bryan obtained a charter from the state. Within a month, eleven acres of land had been purchased by the society on Harvey Street, along "the southeast line of the old Boonville town tract". By September, ground had been broken, for the planned institution. A nine-room two-story residence was constructed and the cornerstone was laid by the following summer. Castle served as the administrator of the home, but did not live there, as she and her husband were farmers and kept a separate home.

The Bryan Colored Rescue Home operated as a training institute to teach farming skills and morals to black youths. The residents raised crops for their own use, and planted cotton on rented fields as cash crops. Resident managers, which in the early days included Castle's daughter Mary Palmer, lived on site and taught at the school. Castle traveled to raise funds for the organization and spoke at many conventions throughout the state, as well as various churches. In 1913, it was reported that six thousand dollars had been raised for the home. After thirty-seven years in Bryan, the couple moved to Big Springs, Texas in the early 1920s.

== Death and legacy ==
Castle died in 1930. The home she founded continued operating for around a decade after Castle left Bryan, but finally closed in 1933 and the orphans who were residents at that time were relocated.
