= Joe Crozier (footballer, born 1889) =

English footballer (1889–1960)

Personal information
- Full name: Joseph Crozier
- Date of birth: 4 December 1889
- Place of birth: Middlesbrough, England
- Date of death: 1960 (aged 70–71)
- Position: Wing half

Senior career*
| Years | Team | Apps | (Gls) |
| 1911–1914 | Middlesbrough | 27 | (0) |
| 1914–1922 | Bradford Park Avenue | 115 | (4) |
| 1922–1923 | Grimsby Town | 14 | (0) |
- * Club domestic league appearances and goals

Joseph Crozier (4 December 1889 – 1960) was an English professional footballer who played as a wing half.
