= Alfred Owen Crozier =

American attorney and author (1863–1939)

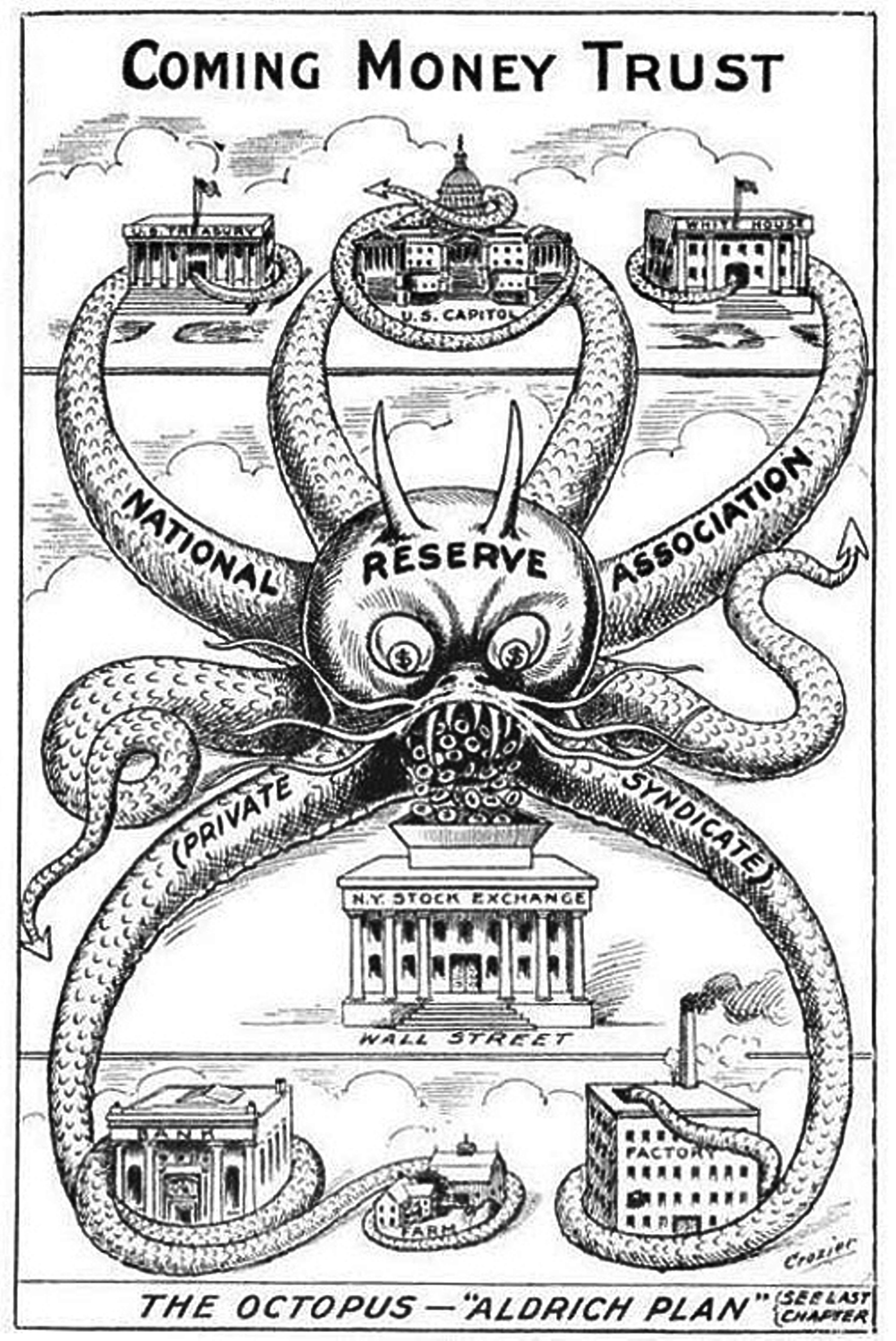
A cartoon published by Alfred Owen Crozier one year before the creation of Federal Reserve System.

Alfred Owen Crozier (1863–1939) was an American attorney and author. He wrote books on the political, legal, and monetary problems of the United States.

== Biography ==
Crozier is best known for his work US Money Vs Corporation Currency, "Aldrich Plan," Wall Street Confessions! Great Bank Combine (1912), which argues against the formation of The Federal Reserve. He feared national banking, but he feared private control of the United States money system even more.

== Publications ==
- The Magnet: A Romance of the Battles of Modern Giants (1908)
- Nation of Nations: The Way to Permanent Peace; A Supreme Constitution for the Government of Governments (1914)
- League of Nations: Shall It Be an Alliance, or a Nation of Nations? Must Be One or the Other! (1919)
- What Ails our Country?: Cause of and Cure for Booms, Crashes, Depressions and Bank Failures (1933).

== See also ==
- Panic of 1907
