= Kennedy Channel =

Arctic sea passage between Greenland and Canada

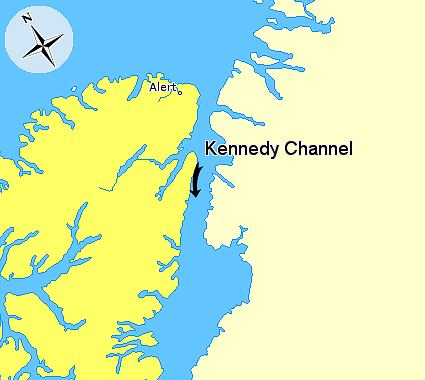
Kennedy Channel, Nunavut, Canada. Ellesmere Island, Nunavut Greenland

Kennedy Channel (Danish: Kennedykanalen; French: Passage Kennedy; 80°55′N 66°30′W) is an Arctic sea passage between Greenland and Canada's most northerly island, Ellesmere Island.

It was named by Elisha Kane around 1854 during his second Arctic voyage in search of the lost Franklin expedition. It is unknown whether it was named for Canadian fur trader, explorer, politician, and historian William Kennedy, whom he had met a few years previously during searches for Franklin's expedition, or John Pendleton Kennedy, the United States Secretary of the Navy during 1852 to 1853.

== Geography ==
It forms part of Nares Strait, linking Kane Basin with Hall Basin. From the south, its beginning is marked by Capes Lawrence and Jackson; its junction with Hall Basin is marked by Capes Baird and Morton. It is about 130 kilometres in length, between 24 and 32 kilometres in width and averages water depths between 180 and 340 metres.

It contains Hans Island, with an ownership shared between Canada and Denmark, because it is located close to the middle between the two coastlines, but about 1,000 meters closer to Greenland's coast. The channel also contains two more islands, Franklin Island and Crozier Island which are located much closer to the Greenland coast and therefore belong to Greenland. Hannah Island is located at the mouth of the Bessel Fjord, northeast of Cape Bryan.
