= Sanigut Islands =

Island group in Nunavut, Canada

- Location within Nunavut Location within Canada

Geography
- Location: Cumberland Sound
- Coordinates: 66°10′N 66°20′W
- Archipelago: Arctic Archipelago

Administration
- Canada
- Territory: Nunavut
- Region: Qikiqtaaluk

Demographics
- Population: Uninhabited

The Sanigut Islands are an uninhabited island group in the Qikiqtaaluk Region of Nunavut, Canada. They are located in Baffin Island's Cumberland Sound, just south of Avataktoo Bay. Aupaluktok Island is the southern one. Anarnittuq Island, Beacon Island, Imigen Island, Ivisa Island, Kekertelung Island, Saunik Island, Tesseralik Island, and Ugpitimik Island are in the vicinity.
