= Wareham Island =

Island in Nunavut, Canada

- Location within Nunavut Location within Canada

Geography
- Location: Cumberland Sound
- Coordinates: 65.250°N 65.050°W
- Archipelago: Arctic Archipelago

Administration
- Canada
- Territory: Nunavut
- Region: Qikiqtaaluk

Demographics
- Population: Uninhabited

Wareham Island is an uninhabited island in the Qikiqtaaluk Region of Nunavut, Canada. It is located in the Cumberland Sound, off Baffin Island's Cumberland Peninsula, southwest of the mouth of Kumlien Fiord. Akulagok Island, Kekerten Island, Kekertukdjuak Island, Miliakdjuin Island, Tesseralik Island, and Tuapait Island are in the vicinity.

== History ==
Dr. Franz Boas made an ethnographical trip to this region in 1883.
