= Nuvujen Island =

Island in Nunavut, Canada

- Location within Nunavut Location within Canada

Geography
- Location: Cumberland Sound
- Coordinates: 65°27′N 66°50′W
- Archipelago: Arctic Archipelago

Administration
- Canada
- Nunavut: Nunavut
- Region: Qikiqtaaluk

Demographics
- Population: Uninhabited

Nuvujen Island is an uninhabited Baffin Island offshore island located in the Arctic Archipelago (the capes) in Nunavut's Qikiqtaaluk Region. It lies on the western shore of Cumberland Sound, between Brown Inlet to the northwest and Robert Peel Inlet to the southeast. Aupaluktut Island lies to its south.

== History ==
In the mid 19th century, approximately 100 Inuit lived on the island according to the journal kept by Mrs. Margaret Penny while she voyaged with her husband, Captain William Penny, aboard the whaler Lady Franklin in this region in 1857/58. The island became an established whaling base at the time. According to Hodge, the Talirpingmiut population dropped to 26 by 1883.
