= Imigen Island =

Island in Nunavut, Canada

- Location within Nunavut Location within Canada

Geography
- Location: Cumberland Sound
- Coordinates: 65.97°N 66.96°W
- Archipelago: Arctic Archipelago

Administration
- Canada
- Nunavut: Nunavut
- Region: Qikiqtaaluk

Demographics
- Population: Uninhabited

Imigen Island is an uninhabited island in the Qikiqtaaluk Region of Nunavut, Canada. It is located in Baffin Island's Cumberland Sound. Ivisa Island lies to its west, Saunik Island to its northwest. Aupaluktok Island, Beacon Island, the Drum Islands, Ekallulik Island, Iglunga Island, the Kaigosuit Islands, the Kaigosuiyat Islands, and the Sanigut Islands are in the vicinity.
