= Opingivik Island =

Island in the Qikiqtaaluk Region, Nunavut, Canada

- Location within Nunavut Location within Canada

Geography
- Location: Cumberland Sound
- Coordinates: 65°18′N 067°04′W
- Archipelago: Arctic Archipelago

Administration
- Canada
- Nunavut: Nunavut
- Region: Qikiqtaaluk
- Largest settlement: Opingivik (ghost town)

Demographics
- Population: Uninhabited
- Ethnic groups: Inuit

Opingivik Island is an uninhabited Baffin Island offshore island located in the Arctic Archipelago in Nunavut's Qikiqtaaluk Region. It lies in Cumberland Sound between Ikpit Bay to the north and Robert Peel Inlet approximately 18.6 km (11.6 mi) to the south.

The former community of Opingivik lies on the southeast coast at 65°16′N 067°03′W.

A second, smaller Opingivik Island lies in Diana Bay, just south of Diana Island.
