= Ekallulik Island =

Island in Nunavut, Canada

- Location within Nunavut Location within Canada

Geography
- Location: Cumberland Sound
- Coordinates: 65°55′12″N 067°16′48″W
- Archipelago: Arctic Archipelago

Administration
- Canada
- Territory: Nunavut
- Region: Qikiqtaaluk

Demographics
- Population: Uninhabited

Ekallulik Island is an uninhabited island in the Qikiqtaaluk Region of Nunavut, Canada. It is located in Baffin Island's Cumberland Sound. Imigen Island, Ivisa Island, Kaigosuit Islands, Kudjak Island, and Saunik Island are in the vicinity.
