= Maktaktujanak Island =

Island in Nunavut, Canada

- Location within Nunavut Location within Canada

Geography
- Location: Cumberland Sound
- Coordinates: 65°15′32″N 066°45′00″W
- Archipelago: Arctic Archipelago

Administration
- Canada
- Nunavut: Nunavut
- Region: Qikiqtaaluk

Demographics
- Population: Uninhabited

Maktaktujanak Island is an uninhabited island located off the shore of Baffin Island, east of Shakshukuk Island, in the Arctic Archipelago in Nunavut's Qikiqtaaluk Region. It lies in Cumberland Sound, approximately 15.4 km (9.6 mi) from Robert Peel Inlet.
