= Nunatsiaq Island =

Island in Nunavut, Canada

- Location within Nunavut Location within Canada

Geography
- Location: Davis Strait
- Coordinates: 67°59′N 65°19′W
- Archipelago: Arctic Archipelago

Administration
- Canada
- Nunavut: Nunavut
- Region: Qikiqtaaluk

Demographics
- Population: Uninhabited

Nunatsiaq Island is an uninhabited island in the Qikiqtaaluk Region of Nunavut, Canada. It is located in Davis Strait, southeast of Baffin Island's Cumberland Peninsula and north of Auyuittuq National Park Reserve. Other islands in the immediate vicinity include Alikdjuak Island, Idjuniving Island, Kekerturnak Island, Manitung Island, and Nedlukseak Island.
