= Ivisa Island =

Island in Nunavut, Canada

- Location within Nunavut Location within Canada

Geography
- Location: Cumberland Sound
- Coordinates: 65°58′N 67°06′W
- Archipelago: Arctic Archipelago

Administration
- Canada
- Nunavut: Nunavut
- Region: Qikiqtaaluk

Demographics
- Population: Uninhabited

Ivisa Island is an uninhabited island in the Qikiqtaaluk Region of Nunavut, Canada. It is located in Baffin Island's Cumberland Sound. Imigen Island lies to its east, Saunik Island to its northeast. Aupaluktok Island, Ekallulik Island, Iglunga Island, the Kaigosuit Islands, and Kudjak Island are in the vicinity.
