= Utsusivik Island =

Island in Nunavut, Canada

- Location within Nunavut Location within Canada

Geography
- Location: Cumberland Sound
- Coordinates: 65°7′2″N 66°38′50″W
- Archipelago: Arctic Archipelago

Administration
- Canada
- Territory: Nunavut
- Region: Qikiqtaaluk

Demographics
- Population: Uninhabited

Utsusivik Island is an uninhabited Baffin Island offshore island located in the Arctic Archipelago in Nunavut's Qikiqtaaluk Region. It lies in Cumberland Sound, across the mouth of Chidliak Bay, approximately 14.4 km (8.9 mi) southeast of Robert Peel Inlet. Nimigen Island lies to its west.
