= Nimigen Island =

Island in Nunavut, Canada

Native name: Kemisuack
- Location within Nunavut Location within Canada

Geography
- Location: Cumberland Sound
- Coordinates: 65.12°N 66.73°W
- Archipelago: Arctic Archipelago

Administration
- Canada
- Nunavut: Nunavut
- Region: Qikiqtaaluk

Demographics
- Population: Uninhabited

Nimigen Island (previously: Kemisuack, Kemisoke, Kimersok, Kimisoke) is an uninhabited Baffin Island offshore island located in the Arctic Archipelago in Nunavut's Qikiqtaaluk Region. It lies in Cumberland Sound, approximately 10.5 km (6.5 mi) east of Robert Peel Inlet To its east is Utsusivik Island; south is Chidliak Bay.

== History ==
In the mid 19th century, the island supported a whaling industry.
