= Aupaluktok Island =

Island in Nunavut, Canada

- Location within Nunavut Location within Canada

Geography
- Location: Cumberland Sound
- Coordinates: 66°09′00″N 066°16′48″W
- Archipelago: Arctic Archipelago

Administration
- Canada
- Territory: Nunavut
- Region: Qikiqtaaluk

Demographics
- Population: Uninhabited

Aupaluktok Island is an uninhabited island in the Qikiqtaaluk Region of Nunavut, Canada. It is one of the two main Sanigut Islands, stretching between Avataktoo Bay to the north and the Cumberland Sound to the south, off Baffin Island's Cumberland Peninsula. Akulagok Island, Anarnittuq Island, Beacon Island, Imigen Island, Ivisa Island, Kekertelung Island, Saunik Island, Tesseralik Island, Tuapait Island, and Ugpitimik Island are in the vicinity.
