= Drum Islands =

Island group in Nunavut, Canada

- Location within Nunavut Location within Canada

Geography
- Location: Cumberland Sound
- Coordinates: 66°04′45″N 067°03′00″W

Administration
- Canada
- Territory: Nunavut
- Region: Qikiqtaaluk

Demographics
- Population: Uninhabited

One of the Baffin Island offshore island groups in Cumberland Sound, the Drum Islands are located on the southern side of the mouth of Kangilo Fiord, south of Iglunga, west of Pangnirtung, and north of the Saunik and Imigen islands. They are part of the Qikiqtaaluk Region, in the Canadian territory of Nunavut.
