= Alexander McDonald (surgeon) =

Scottish physician (1817 – c. 1848)

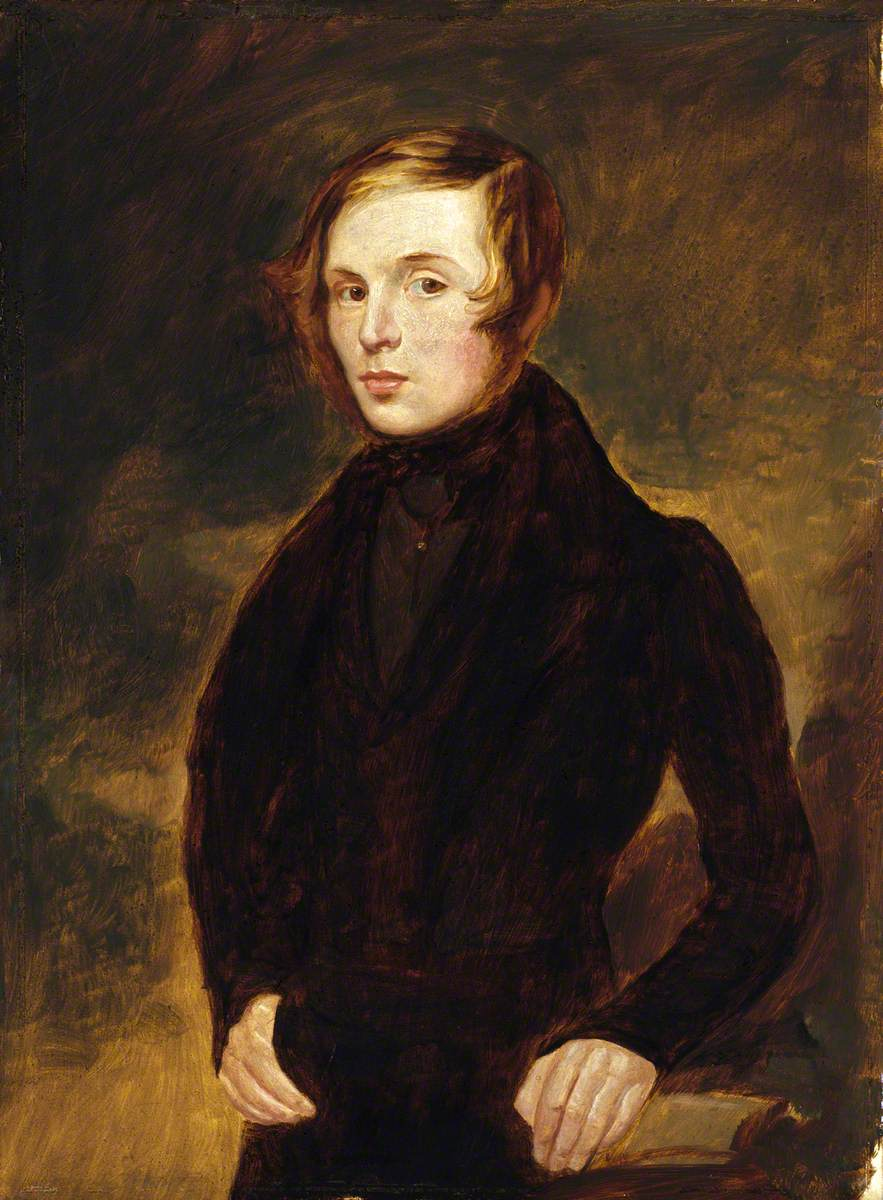
- McDonald c. 1840
- Born: 15 September 1817; Laurencekirk, Kincardineshire, Scotland
- Died: c. 1848 (aged 30–31); King William Island, Canada
- Military career
- Branch: Royal Navy
- Service years: 1841–1848
- Rank: Assistant Surgeon
- Expeditions: Franklin Expedition

Alexander McDonald (or M'Donald; 15 September 1817 – c. 1848) was a Scottish physician who served as assistant surgeon of HMS Terror on Franklin's lost expedition.

== Early life ==
Alexander McDonald was born on 15 September 1817 in Laurencekirk, Kincardineshire, Scotland, to Robert McDonald and Elizabeth Stiven. His father was a silver snuff-box maker, apprentice to Charles Stiven. McDonald attended The Royal College of Surgeons of Edinburgh and graduated in 1838.

== Career ==
To pay for medical school, McDonald spent his summers serving as ship's surgeon for Captain William Penny in the whaling industry. In 1839, Penny brought an Inuk traveler, Eenoolooapik, back with him to Scotland, and McDonald was introduced to the man and served both as his tutor and as his doctor when he contracted a respiratory infection. The next year when they returned to the Arctic, Eenoolooapik guided them to the whale-rich Tenudiakbeek inlet, which Penny christened Hogarth's Sound (now known to be a rediscovery of Cumberland Sound).

In 1841, McDonald published a biography of Eenoolooapik which recounted the events of their voyage, A narrative of some passages in the history of Eenoolooapik, a young Esquimaux, who was brought to Britain in 1839, in the ship "Neptune" of Aberdeen: an account of the discovery of Hogarth's Sound: remarks on the northern whale fishery, and suggestions for its improvement, &c. &c.

After the publication of his book, McDonald applied to serve in the Royal Navy and was accepted as an assistant surgeon. From autumn 1841 to spring 1845, McDonald served on HMS Belvidera in the Mediterranean.

== Franklin Expedition ==
McDonald's book caught the eye of Sir John Franklin, and in 1845 McDonald was appointed to serve as assistant surgeon of HMS Terror on Franklin's expedition to traverse The Northwest Passage. He served as assistant to surgeon John Smart Peddie. Terror and HMS Erebus departed from England on 19 May 1845; the ships were last seen entering Lancaster Sound in late July 1845 and were never heard from again by Europeans.

William Penny, McDonald's old captain and friend, went on three separate expeditions in search of him and the other members of Franklin's crew, but no survivors were ever found. Along with the rest of Franklin's men, McDonald was officially declared dead on 31 March 1854.

In 1850, Penny found a scrap of paper at an abandoned campsite near Wellington Channel with the name "Mr. M'Donald" written on it in pencil. During his 1854 expedition, John Rae received a fork with McDonald's initials from the Inuit at Naujaat, who reported that it was found at a campsite northwest of the mouth of Back River. Captain Leopold McClintock also recovered items belonging to McDonald on his 1859 search expedition via trading with the Inuit in the area, including silver cutlery and a prize medal McDonald was awarded in 1838 at RCSEd.

In May 1869, Charles Francis Hall interviewed an Inuk woman named Ow-wer who told him a story of a meeting between Inuit and Franklin Expedition survivors at a place called Teekeenu. This account mentioned a short, bearded white man who was able to speak some Inuktitut. Hall's interpreters Tookoolito and Ebierbing, who knew McDonald from his time in Baffin Island, were convinced that this man in the story was him. Other Inuit participants in the meeting recalled one of the white men was named "Doktook" (a transliteration of "Doctor"), further evidence that this man was McDonald.

== In popular culture ==
McDonald appeared as a character in the 2007 novel The Terror by Dan Simmons, a fictionalized account of Franklin's lost expedition with a supernatural horror twist. He also appeared in AMC's 2018 television adaptation of the novel, where he was portrayed by Charles Edwards. Showrunner David Kajganich said at a conference that the writers of the series promoted McDonald from assistant surgeon to head surgeon of Terror due to his prior Arctic experience and his ability to speak an unspecified Inuit language (demoting historical Head Surgeon John Smart Peddie).

== See also ==
- Harry Goodsir, the assistant surgeon and naturalist on HMS Erebus
- List of people who disappeared mysteriously at sea
