= Kekertuk Island =

Island in Nunavut, Canada

- Location within Nunavut Location within Canada

Geography
- Location: Davis Strait
- Coordinates: 65°34′N 62°52′W
- Archipelago: Arctic Archipelago

Administration
- Canada
- Nunavut: Nunavut
- Region: Qikiqtaaluk

Demographics
- Population: Uninhabited

Kekertuk Island is an uninhabited island in the Qikiqtaaluk Region of Nunavut, Canada. It is located in Davis Strait, off southeastern Baffin Island's Cumberland Peninsula. Other islands in the immediate vicinity include Akuglek Island, Angijak Island, Kekertaluk Island, and Nuvuktik Island.
