= Eenoolooapik =

Inuk guide (c. 1820–1847)

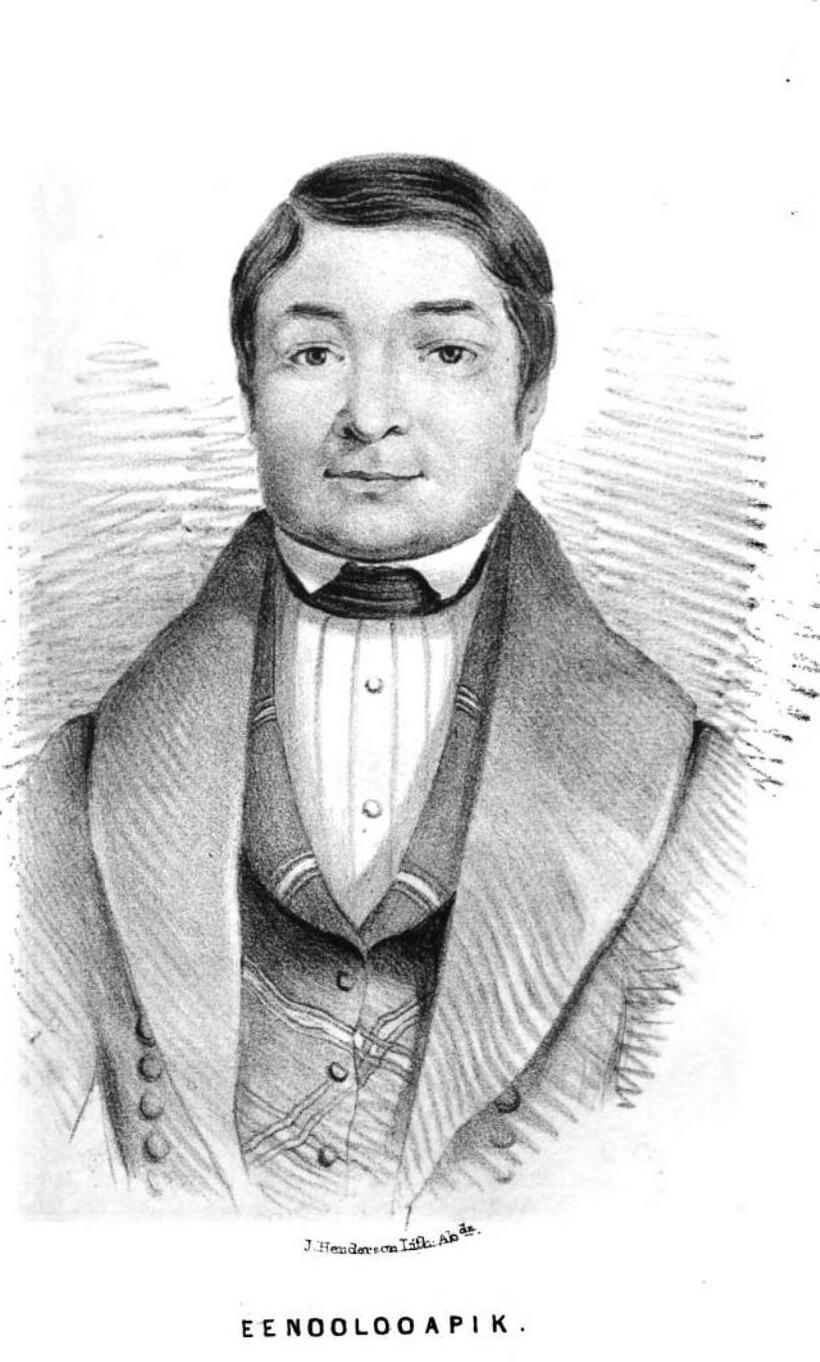
- Lithograph of Eenoolooapik in Alexander MacDonald's biography, 1841
- Born: c. 1820; Qimisuk, Blacklead Island, British Arctic Territories
- Died: 1847 (aged 26–27); Cumberland Sound, British Arctic Territories
- Other names: Bobbie
- Spouse: Amitak (m. 1840)
- Children: 1
- Relatives: Taqulittuq (sister)

Signature
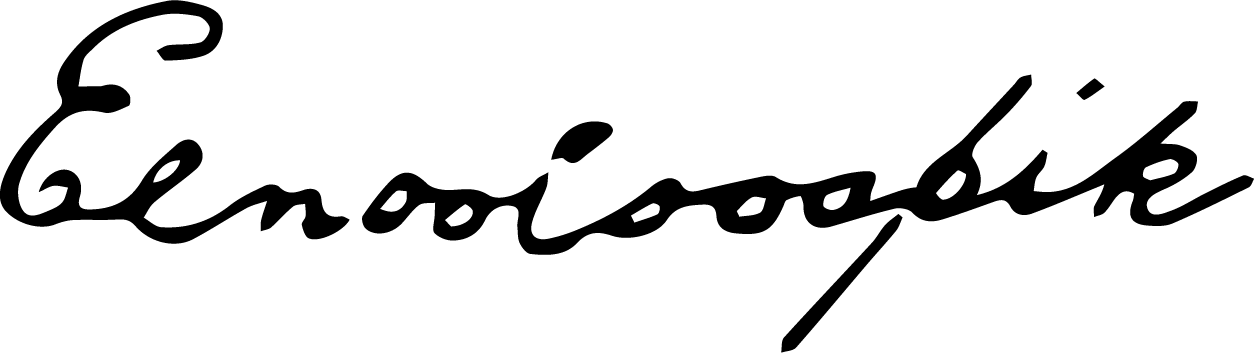

Eenoolooapik (c. 1820 – 1847), also spelled Inuluapik, was an Inuk hunter and guide who served with British whaler William Penny and visited Scotland. Born on Blacklead Island in Cumberland Sound, Eenoolooapik moved with his family to the island of Aggijjat on the eastern coast of Baffin Island. Acquainted as a youth with Scottish whalers operating in the area, he accompanied Penny to Aberdeen, Scotland in 1839, as part of Penny's attempt to lobby for greater funding for Arctic exploration. Eenoolooapik returned to Baffin in 1840 after visiting Greenland. Alexander McDonald published a biography of Eenoolooapik in 1841, likely the only contemporary full-length biography of any Inuk published during the 19th century. In 1847, he died of tuberculosis developed during his time overseas.

== Early life ==
Eenoolooapik (also written as Inuluapik) was born c. 1820 at the settlement of Qimisuk on Blacklead Island, a small islet in Cumberland Sound (referred to as Tenudiakbeek by Eenoolooapik), in the British Arctic Territories. At age ten, he traveled with his family via umiaq across the Cumberland Peninsula to the island of Aggijjat (Durban Island) at Nuvuttiq (Cape Searle). Some years after arriving, Eenoolooapik's father took a younger wife and abandoned his family, leaving the teenaged Eenoolooapik and his siblings to support their mother, Nootaapik. Cape Searle was a frequent hunting grounds for Scottish whalers, and the inquisitive Eenoolooapik planned twice to return to Scotland with the whalers, but both times was convinced to stay at Aggijjat by his mother.

In 1833, Scottish whaler William Penny was sent to investigate Inuit claims of a large bay (corresponding to Cumberland Sound), supposedly a rich whale hunting ground to the south of Exeter Bay that they called Tenudiakbeek. Penny was forced to turn back, but attempted a second journey in 1839 aboard the Neptune. Enquiring with the Inuit at Aggijjat, Penny learned that Eenoolooapik was knowledgeable about the region and enlisted the Inuk, now nineteen, to trace an outline of the region's coastline. Eenoolooapik produced an accurate map of the Cumberland Peninsula, detailing the various fjords, islands, and creeks of the region. Penny brought him back to Scotland, believing that his presence in Britain could convince the Royal Navy to sponsor an official expedition to Tenudiakbeek, not knowing it was the same body of water referred to by earlier explorers as the Cumberland Strait or Northumberland Inlet. Penny presented gifts to Nootaapik and her family (including the infant Taqulittuq), and Eenoolooapik received her begrudging consent to depart from Aggijjat.

== Scotland ==
Eenoolooapik, nicknamed "Bobbie", was well-received by the crew of the Neptune. Quick to adjust to western clothing and pick up English words, he frequently drew sketches to communicate when explaining unfamiliar concepts. Arriving off Scotland in early November, the ship docked at Aberdeen on 8 November 1839, by which time Eenoolooapik had developed a persistent cough. He was reportedly confused by the large size of European trees and the location of houses large distances from the shoreline.

In Aberdeen, he impressed locals with demonstrations of bird-hunting and kayaking. He enjoyed theatre performances, and frequently drew during his free time. Although he preferred European clothing, he was forced to wear traditional Inuit clothing during a kayaking demonstration on the River Dee; Eenoolooapik severely overheated due to heavy exertion and relatively warm temperatures, and developed a fever. His condition improved after several weeks of rest and bloodletting, but he was again bedridden with fever for several months after performing a seal hunting demonstration. Penny attempted to teach Eenoolooapik reading and writing during his recovery, but he lost interest in study after learning the alphabet, seeing it as having no practical use.

== Return ==
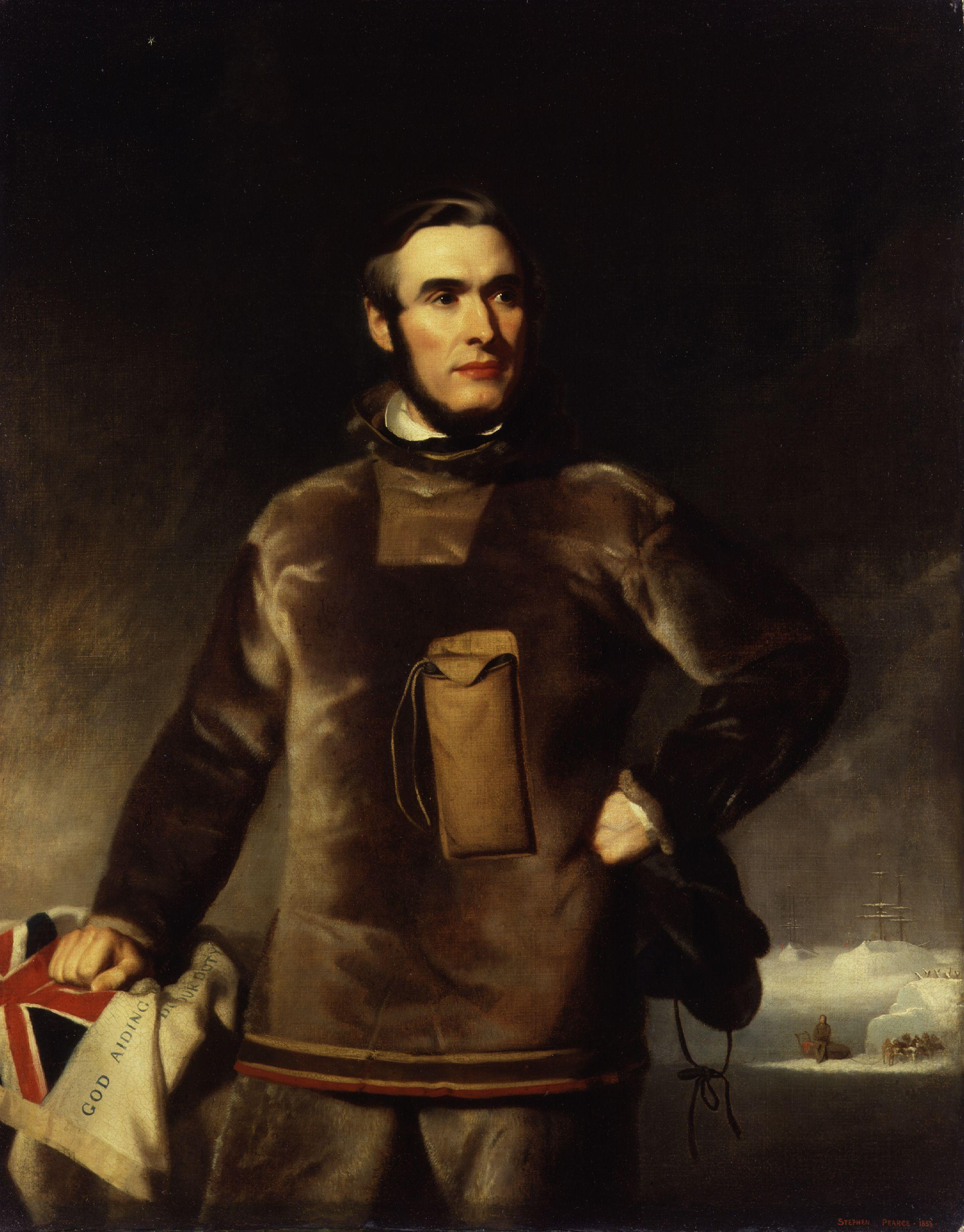
Captain William Penny in the Arctic, 1853

With no sign of naval funding for an exploration mission to Baffin's "inland sea", Captain Penny outfitted a privately funded expedition aboard the Bon Accord. Eenoolooapik was homesick and eager to return home, but enjoyed large amounts of gifts given to him by local Scots; a £20 Treasury grant was given to his supporters who supplied him with cooking utensils, firearms, and clothing. The ship departed from Aberdeen on 1 April 1840.

Eenoolooapik's health considerably improved when the Bon Accord made its way to the Arctic. In Greenland, he enthusiastically met various Kalaallit (West Greenlandic Inuit) who rowed out to the ship; despite differences between the Inuit languages, he "was at least partially understood". Stopping at Disko Island, he drove a dog sled with several Greenlanders. The Bon Accord hunted whales for several weeks in Melville Bay, but withdrew after its sister ship, the Hecla, was crushed by ice. Eenoolooapik was disappointed, as he had planned to visit Northern Baffin in order to meet local Inuit. Ice conditions additionally blocked a return to Aggijjat and his mother, and the Bon Voyage was forced to proceed south towards Cumberland Sound, joined by two Newcastle whaling ships.

By August 1840, sea ice had cleared enough for the ships to enter Cumberland Sound. Near his birthplace of Qimisuk, the Bon Accord encountered four Inuit on an ice floe, including two relatives of Eenoolooapik. They relayed the well-being of his mother and listened to an account of his travels, primarily interested in his visit to Greenland. After exploring the northern reaches of the sound, the Bon Accord stopped at Qimisuk on 20 August, and Eenoolooapik was given leave to depart the ship with a party of sixty Inuit. He was given an Inuktitut Bible as a parting gift, and left with the crew a letter of thanks he had written to an associate in Aberdeen.

== Later life and death ==
In the month following his return to Qimisuk, Eenoolooapik took a wife named Amitak and ventured into the interior of Baffin hunting. He briefly joined Penny during whaling trips in the region in 1844 and 1846. By 1846, he had a son, Angalook. Eenoolooapik died in 1847 from complications of tuberculosis, first developed during his time abroad.

== Legacy ==
Alexander McDonald, a Scottish physician who later died in Franklin's lost expedition, wrote a biography of Eenooloaapik in 1841, (Note: A narrative of some passages in the history of Eenoolooapik, a young Esquimaux, who was brought to Britain in 1839, in the ship "Neptune" of Aberdeen: an account of the discovery of Hogarth's Sound: remarks on the northern whale fishery, and suggestions for its improvement, &c. &c. Online copy) likely the only contemporary full-length biography of any Inuk during the 19th century. Many members of Eenoolooapik's family traveled across portions of the Arctic, including his brother Totocatapik and sister Kur-king. His younger sister, Taqulittuq, visited England and the United States, as well as serving as a guide and interpreter for various Arctic explorers.
