= Angijak Island =

Island in Nunavut, Canada

- Location within Nunavut Location within Canada

Geography
- Location: Davis Strait
- Coordinates: 65°40′N 62°18′W
- Archipelago: Arctic Archipelago
- Area: 134 km^{2} (52 sq mi)

Administration
- Canada
- Territory: Nunavut
- Region: Qikiqtaaluk

Demographics
- Population: Uninhabited

Angijak Island is an uninhabited island in the Qikiqtaaluk Region of Nunavut, Canada. It is located in Davis Strait, off southeastern Baffin Island's Cumberland Peninsula. Other islands in the immediate vicinity include Akuglek Island, Kekertaluk Island, Kekertuk Island, and Nuvuktik Island.

Angijak Island is 134 km^{2} (52 sq mi) in size.
