= Akulagok Island =

Island in Nunavut, Canada

- Location within Nunavut Location within Canada

Geography
- Location: Cumberland Sound
- Coordinates: 65°44′N 65°51′W
- Archipelago: Arctic Archipelago

Administration
- Canada
- Territory: Nunavut
- Region: Qikiqtaaluk

Demographics
- Population: Uninhabited

Akulagok Island is an uninhabited island in the Qikiqtaaluk Region of Nunavut, Canada. It belongs to the Kikastan Islands, located in the Cumberland Sound, off Baffin Island's Cumberland Peninsula. On its south side, Kekerten Harbour lies between Akulagok and Kekerten Island, while to the north lies Tuapait Island. Aupaluktok Island, Upajjana (formerly Beacon Island), Kekertukdjuak Island, Miliakdjuin Island, Tesseralik Island, and Utaqqiurviarjuruluk (formerly Ugpitimik Island) are in the vicinity.

== See also ==
- Qikiqtan Territorial Park
