= Miliakdjuin Island =

Island in Nunavut, Canada

- Location within Nunavut Location within Canada

Geography
- Location: Cumberland Sound
- Coordinates: 65°33′N 65°31′W
- Archipelago: Arctic Archipelago

Administration
- Canada
- Nunavut: Nunavut
- Region: Qikiqtaaluk

Demographics
- Population: Uninhabited

Miliakdjuin Island is an uninhabited island in the Qikiqtaaluk Region of Nunavut, Canada. It is located southeast of the Kikastan Islands in the Cumberland Sound, off Baffin Island's Cumberland Peninsula. Akulagok Island, Kekerten Island, Kekertukdjuak Island, Tesseralik Island, Tuapait Island, and Wareham Island are in the vicinity.
