= Shakshukowshee Island =

Uninhabited island in the Canadian Arctic

- Location within Nunavut Location within Canada

Geography
- Location: Cumberland Sound
- Coordinates: 65°14′57″N 66°53′50″W
- Archipelago: Arctic Archipelago

Administration
- Canada
- Territory: Nunavut
- Region: Qikiqtaaluk

Demographics
- Population: Uninhabited

Shakshukowshee Island is a Baffin Island offshore island located in the Arctic Archipelago in Nunavut's Qikiqtaaluk Region. The uninhabited island lies in Cumberland Sound, at the mouth of Robert Peel Inlet. Shakshukuk Island lies along its east side.
