= Akuglek Island =

Island in Nunavut, Canada

- Location within Nunavut Location within Canada

Geography
- Location: Davis Strait
- Coordinates: 65°37′N 62°28′W
- Archipelago: Arctic Archipelago

Administration
- Canada
- Territory: Nunavut
- Region: Qikiqtaaluk

Demographics
- Population: Uninhabited

Akuglek Island is an uninhabited island in the Qikiqtaaluk Region of Nunavut, Canada. It is located in Davis Strait, southeast of Sakiak Fiord, off southeastern Baffin Island's Cumberland Peninsula. Angijak Island is to its northeast, Nuvuktik Island to its south. Other islands in the immediate vicinity include Kekertaluk Island and Kekertuk Island.
