= Nuvuktik Island =

Island in Nunavut, Canada

- Interactive map of Nuvuktik Island

Geography
- Location: Davis Strait
- Coordinates: 65°33′N 62°29′W
- Archipelago: Arctic Archipelago

Administration
- Canada
- Territory: Nunavut
- Region: Qikiqtaaluk Region

Demographics
- Population: Uninhabited
- Source: Nuvuktik Island at Atlas of Canada

Nuvuktik Island is an uninhabited island in the Qikiqtaaluk Region of Nunavut, Canada.

It is in Davis Strait, off southeastern Baffin Island's Cumberland Peninsula. Other islands in the immediate vicinity include Akuglek Island, Angijak Island, Kekertaluk Island, and Kekertuk Island.
