= Aupaluktut Island =

Island in Nunavut, Canada

- Location within Nunavut Location within Canada

Geography
- Location: Cumberland Sound
- Coordinates: 65°24′02″N 066°49′50″W
- Archipelago: Arctic Archipelago
- Highest elevation: 30 m (100 ft)

Administration
- Canada
- Territory: Nunavut
- Region: Qikiqtaaluk

Demographics
- Population: Uninhabited

Aupaluktut Island is an uninhabited Baffin Island offshore island located in the Arctic Archipelago in Nunavut's Qikiqtaaluk Region. It lies in Cumberland Sound, between Brown Inlet and Ikpit Bay. It rises approximately 30 m (98 ft) above sea level. Nuvujen Island lies to its north. Robert Peel Inlet is due south, approximately 29.4 km (18.3 mi) away.
