= Clear Passage Island =

Island in Nunavut, Canada

- Location within Nunavut Location within Canada

Geography
- Location: Cumberland Sound
- Coordinates: 66°24′00″N 067°36′36″W
- Archipelago: Arctic Archipelago

Administration
- Canada
- Territory: Nunavut
- Region: Qikiqtaaluk

Demographics
- Population: Uninhabited

Clear Passage Island is an uninhabited island in the Qikiqtaaluk Region of Nunavut, Canada. It lies in Kangilo Fiord, the southern of Baffin Island's Cumberland Sound's two ends (the other being Clearwater Fiord). The False Passage Peninsula lies northwest of the island. Anarnittuq Island, Iglunga Island, and Nunatak Island are in the vicinity.
