= Nunatak Island =

Island in Nunavut, Canada

- Location within Nunavut Location within Canada

Geography
- Location: Cumberland Sound
- Coordinates: 66°28′N 66°58′W
- Archipelago: Arctic Archipelago

Administration
- Canada
- Territory: Nunavut
- Region: Qikiqtaaluk

Demographics
- Population: Uninhabited

Nunatak Island is an uninhabited island in the Qikiqtaaluk Region of Nunavut, Canada. It is located at the northern end of Baffin Island's Cumberland Sound, at the junction of Shark Fiord and Clearwater Fiord. Southeast is Kekertelung Island. Anarnittuq Island, Clear Passage Island, and Iglunga Island are also located within this vicinity.

As of the 1970s, there was reportedly a small Inuit settlement on the west side of Nunatak, though it has likely since been abandoned.
