= Utaqqiurviarjuruluk =

Island in Nunavut, Canada

- Location within Nunavut Location within Canada

Geography
- Location: Cumberland Sound
- Coordinates: 66°05′33″N 65°54′22″W
- Archipelago: Arctic Archipelago

Administration
- Canada
- Territory: Nunavut
- Region: Qikiqtaaluk

Demographics
- Population: Uninhabited

Utaqqiurviarjuruluk (Inuktitut syllabics: ᐅᑕᖅᑭᐅᕐᕕᐊᕐᔪᕈᓗᒃ) formerly Ugpitimik Island is an uninhabited island in the Qikiqtaaluk Region of Nunavut, Canada. It is located at the mouth of Pangnirtung Fiord, in the Cumberland Sound, off Baffin Island's Cumberland Peninsula. Akulagok Island, Aupaluktok Island, Upajjana, Kekerten Island, Kekertukdjuak Island, Tesseralik Island, and Tuapait Island are in the vicinity.
