= Kekerturnak Island =

Island in Canada

- Location within Nunavut Location within Canada

Geography
- Location: Davis Strait
- Coordinates: 67.87°N 64.86°W
- Archipelago: Arctic Archipelago

Administration
- Canada
- Nunavut: Nunavut
- Region: Qikiqtaaluk

Demographics
- Population: Uninhabited

Kekerturnak Island is an uninhabited island in the Qikiqtaaluk Region of Nunavut, Canada. It is located in Davis Strait, southeast of Baffin Island's Cumberland Peninsula and north of Auyuittuq National Park Reserve. Other islands in the immediate vicinity include Alikdjuak Island, Idjuniving Island, and Nunatsiaq Island.
