= Upajjana =

Island in Nunavut, Canada

- Location within Nunavut Location within Canada

Geography
- Location: Cumberland Sound
- Coordinates: 66°05′19″N 065°55′50″W
- Archipelago: Arctic Archipelago

Administration
- Canada
- Territory: Nunavut
- Region: Qikiqtaaluk

Demographics
- Population: Uninhabited

Upajjana (ᐅᐸᔾᔭᓇ) formerly Beacon Island is an uninhabited island in the Qikiqtaaluk Region of Nunavut, Canada. It lies in the Cumberland Sound, at the mouth of the Pangnirtung Fiord, near Pangnirtung off Baffin Island's Cumberland Peninsula. Akulagok Island, Aupaluktok Island, Imigen Island, Kekerten Island, Kekertukdjuak Island, Tesseralik Island, Tuapait Island, and Ugpitimik Island are in the vicinity.

== See also ==
- Anguttuaq, formerly Beacon Island
- Beacon Island (Hudson Strait)
- Beacon Island (Ungava Bay)
