= Qikiqtan Territorial Park =

Territorial park in Nunavut, Canada

Coordinates: 65°42′N 065°49′W

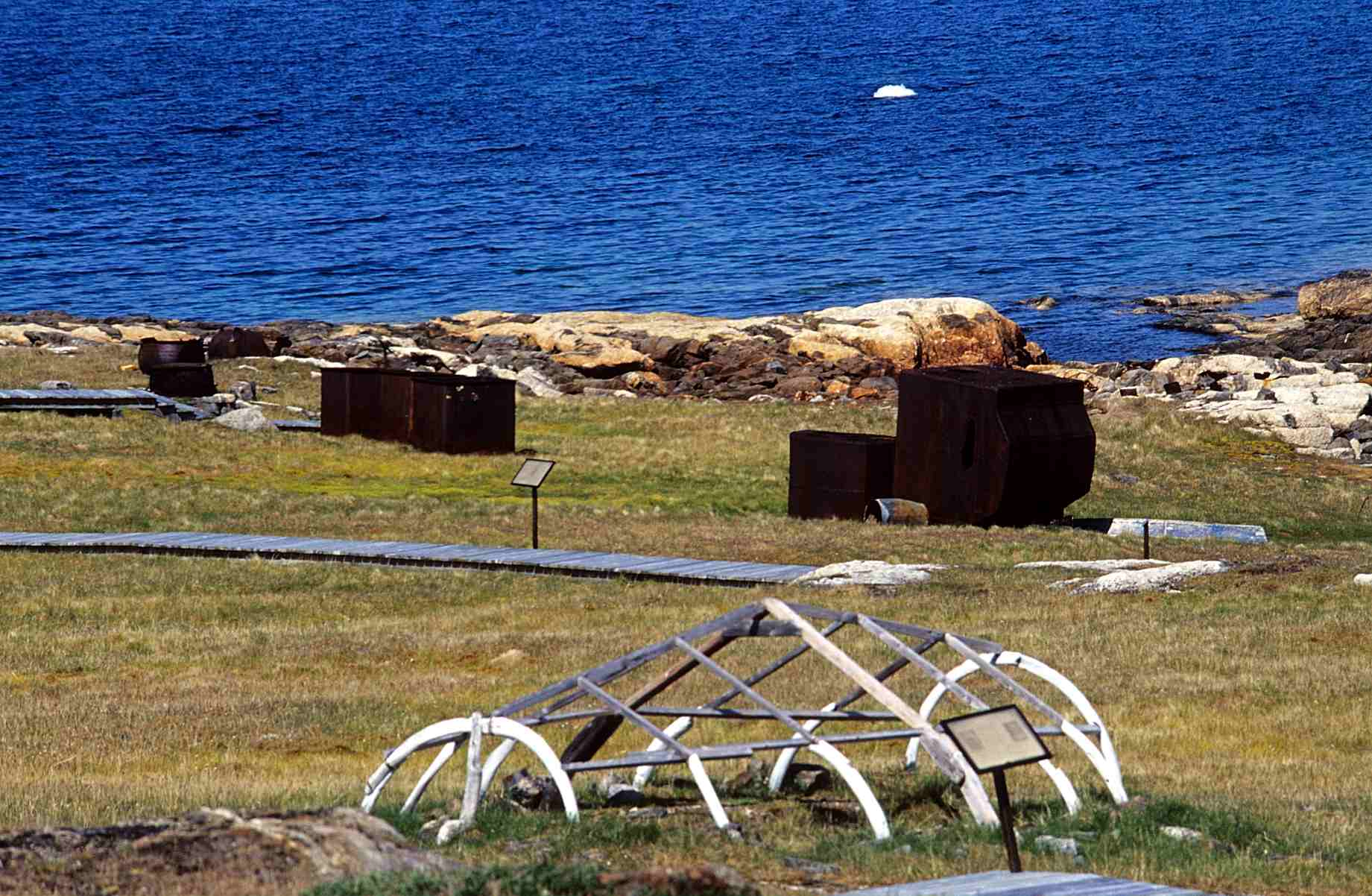
Kekerten Territorial Park

Qikiqtan Territorial Park formerly Kekerten Territorial Park is a park on Kekerten Island, about 50 km (31 mi) south of Pangnirtung, in the Qikiqtaaluk Region of Nunavut, Canada.

== History ==
Where the park is now was site of a whaling station established in 1840 by William Penny, and the Cumberland Sound area became a major whale hunting ground. The British and American whalers relied on local Inuit knowledge in their quest for whales. Remains of the storehouses are still visible, as are the remains of a whaling ship.

== Access ==
The only means of getting to the park is a 3-hour boat ride from Pangnirtung in the summer or a longer trip in winter by snowmobile.
