= Rock Island (Nunavut) =

Island in Qikiqtaaluk Region, Nunavut, Canada

- Location within Nunavut Location within Canada

Geography
- Location: Davis Strait
- Coordinates: 68°24′N 66°43′W
- Archipelago: Arctic Archipelago

Administration
- Canada
- Territory: Nunavut
- Region: Qikiqtaaluk

Demographics
- Population: Uninhabited

Rock Island is an uninhabited island in the Qikiqtaaluk Region of Nunavut, Canada. It is located in Davis Strait, southeast of Baffin Island's Cumberland Peninsula and north of Auyuittuq National Park Reserve. Other islands in the immediate vicinity include Kekertaluk Island, Nedlukseak Island, Nudlung Island, Pilektuak Island, and Satigsun Island.
