= Kekertukdjuak Island =

Island in Nunavut, Canada

- Location within Nunavut Location within Canada

Geography
- Location: Cumberland Sound
- Coordinates: 65°52′N 65°35′W
- Archipelago: Arctic Archipelago

Administration
- Canada
- Nunavut: Nunavut
- Region: Qikiqtaaluk

Demographics
- Population: Uninhabited

Kekertukdjuak Island formerly Kekertuk Island is an uninhabited island in the Qikiqtaaluk Region of Nunavut, Canada. It is located where Kingnait Fiord joins the Cumberland Sound, off Baffin Island's Cumberland Peninsula. The Kikastan Islands (Akulagok Island, Kekerten Island, Tuapait Island) lie to its southwest. Beacon Island, Miliakdjuin Island, Tesseralik Island, and Ugpitimik Island are in the vicinity.
