= Kekertelung Island =

Island in Nunavut, Canada

- Location within Nunavut Location within Canada

Geography
- Location: Cumberland Sound
- Coordinates: 66°21′N 66°44′W
- Archipelago: Arctic Archipelago

Administration
- Canada
- Nunavut: Nunavut
- Region: Qikiqtaaluk

Demographics
- Population: Uninhabited

Kekertelung Island is an uninhabited island in the Qikiqtaaluk Region of Nunavut, Canada. It is located in Baffin Island's Cumberland Sound. Anarnittuq Island lies to its west. Aupaluktok Island, Iglunga Island, and Nunatak Island are in the vicinity.

A 1970s archaeological investigation of islands in the vicinity of the Cumberland Sound described a historical Thule culture site, deemed Site Mb Di-1 (P), on a small islet on the west coast of Kekertelung. The site contained 15 poorly preserved house structures, along with 3 burial cairns, meat caches and a tent ring. There are countless other sites, varying in size, in the region surrounding Kekertelung.
