= Tuapait Island =

Island in Nunavut, Canada

- Location within Nunavut Location within Canada

Geography
- Location: Cumberland Sound
- Coordinates: 65°46′N 65°47′W
- Archipelago: Arctic Archipelago

Administration
- Canada
- Territory: Nunavut
- Region: Qikiqtaaluk

Demographics
- Population: Uninhabited

Tuapait Island is an uninhabited island in the Qikiqtaaluk Region of Nunavut, Canada. It is one of the Kikastan Islands, located in the Cumberland Sound, off Baffin Island's Cumberland Peninsula. To its south lie Akulagok Island and Kekerten Island. Aupaluktok Island, Beacon Island, Kekertukdjuak Island, Miliakdjuin Island, Tesseralik Island, and Ugpitimik Island are in the vicinity.
