= Saunik Island =

Island in Nunavut, Canada

- Location within Nunavut Location within Canada

Geography
- Location: Cumberland Sound
- Coordinates: 66°00′N 67°02′W
- Archipelago: Arctic Archipelago

Administration
- Canada
- Territory: Nunavut
- Region: Qikiqtaaluk

Demographics
- Population: Uninhabited

Saunik Island is an uninhabited island in the Qikiqtaaluk Region of Nunavut, Canada. It is located in Baffin Island's Cumberland Sound. Imigen Island lies to its southeast, Ivisa Island to its southwest. Aupaluktok Island, Ekallulik Island, Iglunga Island, and the Kaigosuit Islands are in the vicinity.
