= Kudjak Island =

Island in Nunavut, Canada

- Location within Nunavut Location within Canada

Geography
- Location: Cumberland Sound
- Coordinates: 65°38′N 67°14′W
- Archipelago: Arctic Archipelago

Administration
- Canada
- Nunavut: Nunavut
- Region: Qikiqtaaluk

Demographics
- Population: Uninhabited

Kudjak Island is an uninhabited Baffin Island offshore island located in the Arctic Archipelago in Nunavut's Qikiqtaaluk Region. It lies in Cumberland Sound, between the mouths of Irvine and Brown Inlets
