= Tesseralik Island =

Island in Nunavut, Canada

- Location within Nunavut Location within Canada

Geography
- Location: Cumberland Sound
- Coordinates: 65.93°N 65.93°W
- Archipelago: Arctic Archipelago

Administration
- Canada
- Territory: Nunavut
- Region: Qikiqtaaluk

Demographics
- Population: Uninhabited

Tesseralik Island is an uninhabited island in the Qikiqtaaluk Region of Nunavut, Canada. It is located in the Cumberland Sound, off Baffin Island's Cumberland Peninsula, and is one of the islands forming Brown Harbour. Akulagok Island, Aupaluktok Island, Beacon Island, Kekerten Island, Kekertukdjuak Island, Miliakdjuin Island, Tuapait Island, and Ugpitimik Island are in the vicinity.
