= Kekerten Island =

Island in Nunavut, Canada

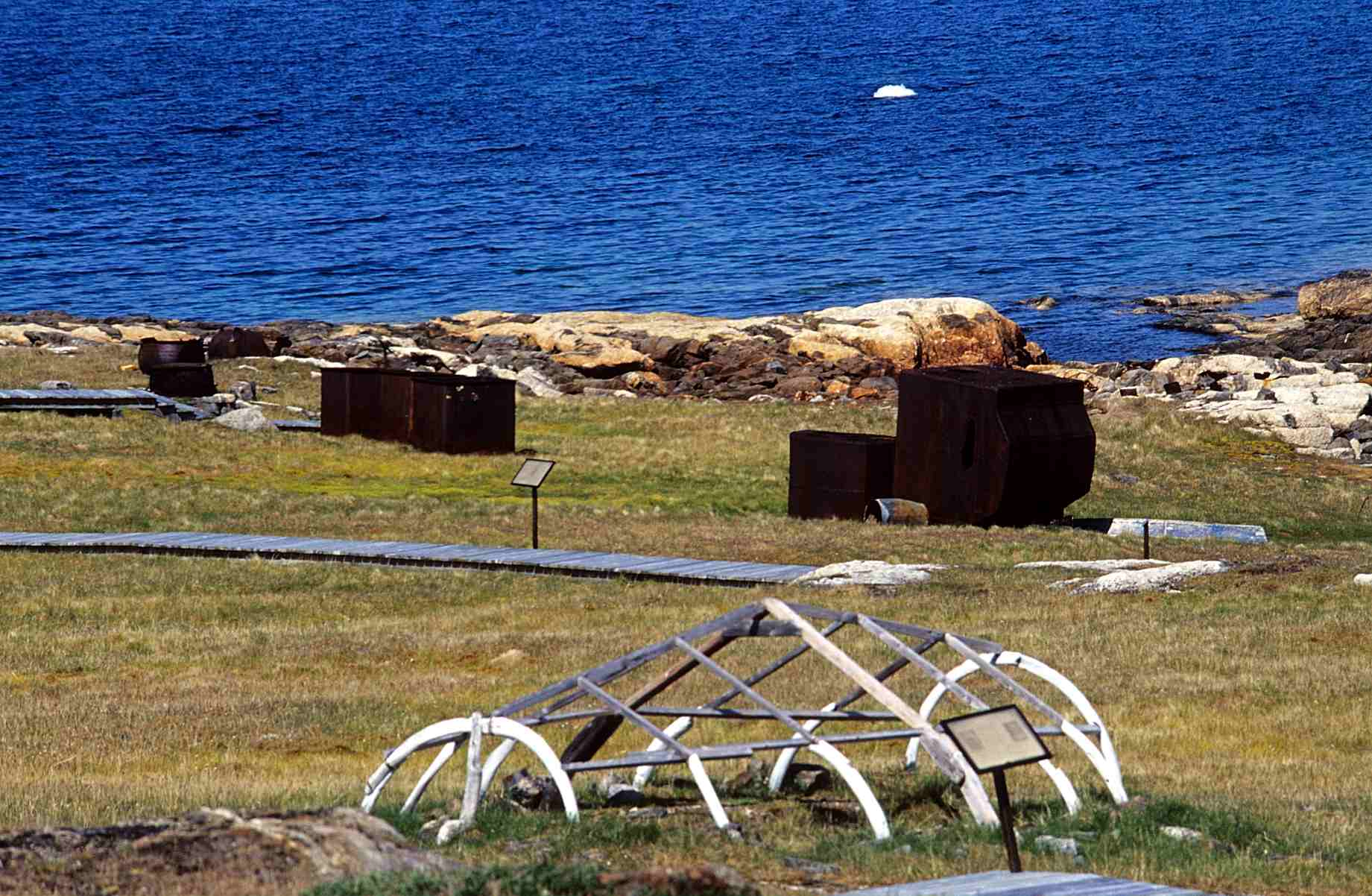
- Kekerten Territorial Park

- Location within Nunavut Location within Canada

Geography
- Location: Cumberland Sound
- Coordinates: 65°42′N 065°48′W
- Archipelago: Arctic Archipelago

Administration
- Canada
- Nunavut: Nunavut
- Region: Qikiqtaaluk

Demographics
- Population: Uninhabited

Kekerten Island is an uninhabited island in the Qikiqtaaluk Region of Nunavut, Canada. Southernmost of the Kikastan Islands, it is located in the Cumberland Sound, off Baffin Island's Cumberland Peninsula. Akulagok Island forms Kekerten Harbour with the island. Tuapait Island lies to the north. Beacon Island, Kekertukdjuak Island, Miliakdjuin Island, Tesseralik Island, and Ugpitimik Island are in the vicinity.

Kekerten Territorial Park is located on the island.

Scottish whalers had been fishing in the Cumberland Sound since the early 19th century and with the arrival of the American whalers in the 1850s winter stations were established. The Aberdeen whaler, Cpt. William Penny spent several winters around 1883–84 at Kekerten. The anthropologist Franz Boas similarly lived at the Kekerten settlement while studying Baffin Island for 13 months starting in August 1883. In 1915, Kekerten was purchased by Robert Kinnes & Co. and operated as a trading post until it was sold to the Hudson's Bay Company in 1923. With the establishment of the main HBC post at Pangnirtung, Kekerten was abandoned in 1925.
