= Shakshukuk Island =

Island in Nunavut, Canada

- Location within Nunavut Location within Canada

Geography
- Location: Cumberland Sound
- Coordinates: 65.26°N 66.86°W
- Archipelago: Arctic Archipelago
- Highest elevation: 30 m (100 ft)

Administration
- Canada
- Territory: Nunavut
- Region: Qikiqtaaluk

Demographics
- Population: Uninhabited

Shakshukuk Island is a Baffin Island offshore island located in the Arctic Archipelago in Nunavut's Qikiqtaaluk Region. It lies in Cumberland Sound, at the mouth of Robert Peel Inlet. Shakshukowshee Island lies along its west side.
