= Cumberland Sound beluga =

Population of belugas

The Cumberland Sound belugas are a distinct population of belugas residing in the Cumberland Sound region of the Labrador Sea off the coast of Nunavut, Canada Individuals of this population reside in the sound year-round, congregating in its extreme north exclusively at Clearwater Fjord during the summer for calving. The Cumberland Sound beluga population is considered fairly isolated and genetically distinct from other beluga populations, with a notable number of haplotypes and microsatellite loci not found elsewhere.

== Biology ==
Adult females and males in the population reach mean lengths of 362 and 428 cm (11.88 and 14.04 ft) respectively and weigh from 800 to 1000 kg (1750 - 2200 Ibs). The peak breeding season appears to occur in May with calves being born in late July or early August after a gestation period of about 14.5 months. Life expectancy is about 16 years, but Belugas in their late 20s have been recorded; the oldest female and male sampled from the catch in Cumberland Sound to date are 26 and 24 years respectively. Research suggests a low reproductive rate, typical of the K-selected species.

Belugas occupy mostly the western side of the Cumberland Sound in spring and early autumn. In summer, they are found mainly in Clearwater Fiord and adjacent bays where they are reported to feed on a large diversity of fish and invertebrate species including squid, tube worms, caplin, Greenland cod and Atlantic cod. In late autumn and early winter, belugas move to the centre of the Sound, diving to depths of 300 m or more to feed on deep-water species such as Greenland halibut. Local hunters also report that belugas at the floe-edge in spring prey mainly on Arctic cod and turbot under the ice. In winter, belugas move to the eastern side of the Sound near the mouth, following open water.

== Hunting ==
=== Commercial ===
Large commercial hunting by the Hudson's Bay Company during the commercial whaling period between 1868 and 1940 reduced the original population of some 5,000 whales to less than 1,000 individuals in the 1970s. This major population decline prompted the government to regulate hunting in the 1980s, with prohibition of commercial beluga harvests.

=== Traditional ===
The Inuit of the southeast Baffin region have long depended on the hunt of belugas in Cumberland Sound for their survival and culture. Local hunters have extensive traditional ecological knowledge of belugas and hunt them mostly in summer, avoiding taking calves and females with calves. As part of 1980s hunting regulations, quotas were set for Inuit harvests: the annual quota for belugas hunted in Cumberland Sound was 35 whales between 1992 and 2001, and was increased to 41 whales in 2002. Total landings between 1992 and 2001 fluctuated between 15 and 50, averaging 36 to 37 belugas per year.

== Conservation status ==
In 1990, the southeast Baffin - Cumberland Sound beluga population was designated as Endangered by the Committee on the Status of Endangered Wildlife in Canada (COSEWIC) based on the historical decline of the population due to overhunting. Aerial surveys in 1999 indicated an estimated Cumberland Sound beluga population of 1,547, indicating an increase from the historical low and the possibility that the population is stable and gradually recovering.

In 2004, the Cumberland Sound population was split off as distinct from the Baffin Island population and assessed as Threatened by COSEWIC, pending listing under the Species at Risk Act. Research and monitoring is under way into the population dynamics and ecology of the population to inform conservation and recovery strategies. While current harvest quotas appear sustainable, there are concerns about the impact of noise from increased boat traffic as well as competition over Greenland halibut with human fisheries.

== See also ==
- List of whale and dolphin species
- Marine biology
