= Iglunga Island =

Island in Nunavut, Canada

- Location within Nunavut Location within Canada

Geography
- Location: Cumberland Sound
- Coordinates: 66°17′15″N 67°09′30″W
- Archipelago: Arctic Archipelago

Administration
- Canada
- Nunavut: Nunavut
- Region: Qikiqtaaluk

Demographics
- Population: Uninhabited

Iglunga Island is an uninhabited island in the Qikiqtaaluk Region of Nunavut, Canada. It is located in Baffin Island's Cumberland Sound, between Kangilo Fiord and Kangerk Fiord. Anarnittuq Island, Clear Passage Island, Imigen Island, Ivisa Island, the Kekertelung Islands, Nunatak Island, and Saunik Island are in the vicinity.
