= Anarnittuq Island =

Island in Nunavut, Canada

- Location within Nunavut Location within Canada

Geography
- Location: Cumberland Sound
- Coordinates: 66°22′N 066°59′W
- Archipelago: Arctic Archipelago

Administration
- Canada
- Territory: Nunavut
- Region: Qikiqtaaluk

Demographics
- Population: Uninhabited
- Ethnic groups: Inuit

Anarnittuq Island is an uninhabited island in the Qikiqtaaluk Region of Nunavut, Canada. It is located in Baffin Island's Cumberland Sound. It lies at the combined mouths of Clearwater and Shark Fiord, between Clear Passage Island (to its west) and Kekertelung Island (to its east). The Sanigut Islands (including Aupaluktok Island), Iglunga Island, and Nunatak Island are in the vicinity.
