= Margaret Penny =

Scottish woman explorer

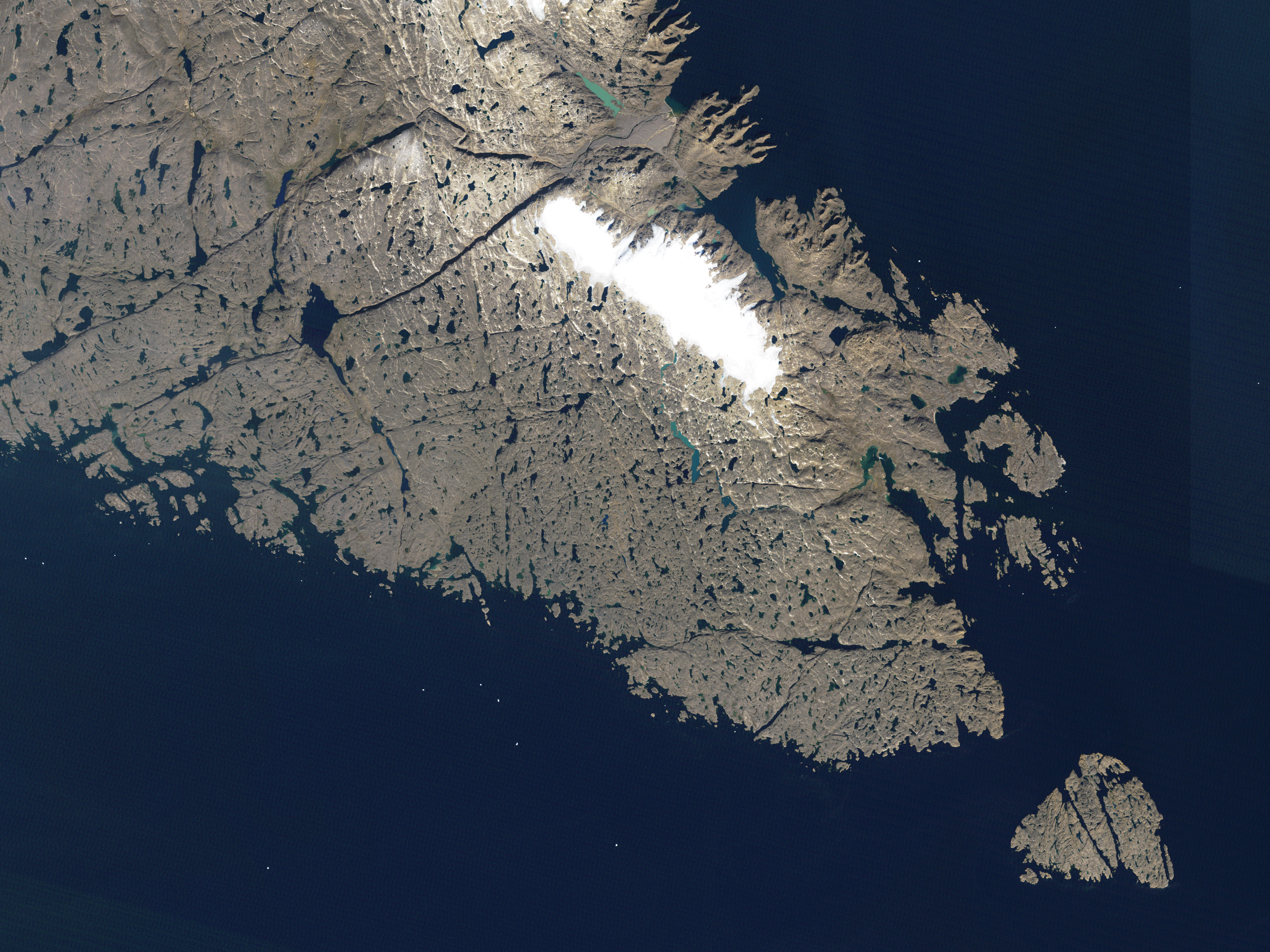
- Baffin Island
- Born: Margaret Irvine; 12 December 1812
- Died: 11 June 1891 (aged 78)
- Known for: Northern pioneer

Margaret Penny née Irvine (12 December 1812 - 11 June 1891) was an explorer and pioneer who was the first Scottish woman to go on an expedition to Baffin Island in Nunavut, Canada.

== Biography ==
In 1857 Penny sailed with her husband, Captain William Penny (1809-1892), on an Arctic whaling voyage. There had been for some time a significant British whaling industry, but very few women ever experienced it directly, and those who did mostly sailed to the South Seas. Penny sailed from Aberdeen on the whaling ship the Lady Franklin in August 1857, returning in August of the following year. On this voyage she was accompanied by her son and the Moravian missionary Mathias Warmow. The ship was named after Jane Franklin, widow of the explorer John Franklin, who had disappeared in the Arctic.

In her voyage diary, Penny wrote about the lives of the Inuit:

"Dec. 15th ... I was on shore in several of their edloos [igloos] ... can now crawl out & in as well as any Esquimaux & eat mactac [muktuk, the skin and blubber of a whale, rich in vitamin C] with pleasure."

At the end of the voyage Penny's contribution to the expedition was recognised by the Aberdeen Arctic Company's shareholders, on her return from the Cumberland Inlet in the Lady Franklin. They presented her with a silver tea service, considered an appropriate gift for a lady who had entertained the Eskimo belles of Kekerten to tea on board the ship. The tea service is now held by the City of Aberdeen Art Gallery and Museum.
