= Diana Island =

Uninhabited island in the Canadian Arctic

- Location within Nunavut Location within Canada

Geography
- Location: Northern Canada
- Coordinates: 60°59′13″N 69°58′30″W
- Archipelago: Arctic Archipelago

Administration
- Canada
- Territory: Nunavut

Demographics
- Population: Uninhabited

Diana Island is an uninhabited island in the Qikiqtaaluk Region of Nunavut, Canada. It lies in Hudson Strait's Diana Bay, in the north-east of Quebec's Ungava Peninsula.
