= Kaigosuit Islands =

Group of islands in Nunavut, Canada

- Location within Nunavut Location within Canada

Geography
- Location: Cumberland Sound
- Coordinates: 65°47′N 67°28′W

Administration
- Canada
- Nunavut: Nunavut
- Region: Qikiqtaaluk

Demographics
- Population: Uninhabited
- Source: Kaigosuit Islands at Atlas of Canada

One of the uninhabited Baffin Island offshore island groups in Cumberland Sound, the Kaigosuit Islands are located long the south side of Nettilling Fiord, and southwest of Pangnirtung. The Kaigosuiyat Islands run parallel to the south. Further south is Irvine Inlet. The Kaigosuits are part of the Qikiqtaaluk Region, in the Canadian territory of Nunavut.
