= Kaigosuiyat Islands =

Island group in Nunavut, Canada

- Location within Nunavut Location within Canada

Geography
- Location: Irvine Inlet
- Coordinates: 65°44′N 67°29′W

Administration
- Canada
- Nunavut: Nunavut
- Region: Qikiqtaaluk

Demographics
- Population: Uninhabited
- Source: Kaigosuiyat Islands at Atlas of Canada

One of the Baffin Island offshore, uninhabited island groups, the Kaigosuiyat Islands are located between Irvine Inlet and Nettilling Fiord, south of Iglunga and southwest of Pangnirtung. They are part of the Qikiqtaaluk Region, in the Canadian territory of Nunavut.
