= Irvine Inlet =

Inlet in Nunavut, Canada

Irvine Inlet (65°40′N 067°40′W) is a body of water in Nunavut, Canada. Located in the Qikiqtaaluk Region, it lies in western Cumberland Sound, forming a wedge into Baffin Island's Hall Peninsula. There are many irregularly shaped islands at the mouth of the inlet.
