= Kekertaluk Island =

Island in Qikiqtaaluk Region, Nunavut, Canada

- Location within Nunavut Location within Canada

Geography
- Location: Davis Strait
- Coordinates: 68°12′N 66°24′W
- Archipelago: Arctic Archipelago

Administration
- Canada
- Nunavut: Nunavut
- Region: Qikiqtaaluk

Demographics
- Population: Uninhabited

"Kekertaluk Island" also refers to an island off the southeastern tip of the Cumberland Peninsula, at 65.545°N 63.185°W.

Kekertaluk Island is an uninhabited island in the Qikiqtaaluk Region of Nunavut, Canada. It is located in Davis Strait, north of Baffin Island's Cumberland Peninsula and north of Auyuittuq National Park Reserve. Other islands in the immediate vicinity include Manitung Island, Nedlukseak Island, Nudlung Island, Pilektuak Island, Rock Island, and Satigsun Island.
