= William Penny =

Scottish shipmaster, whaler and arctic explorer (1809–1892)

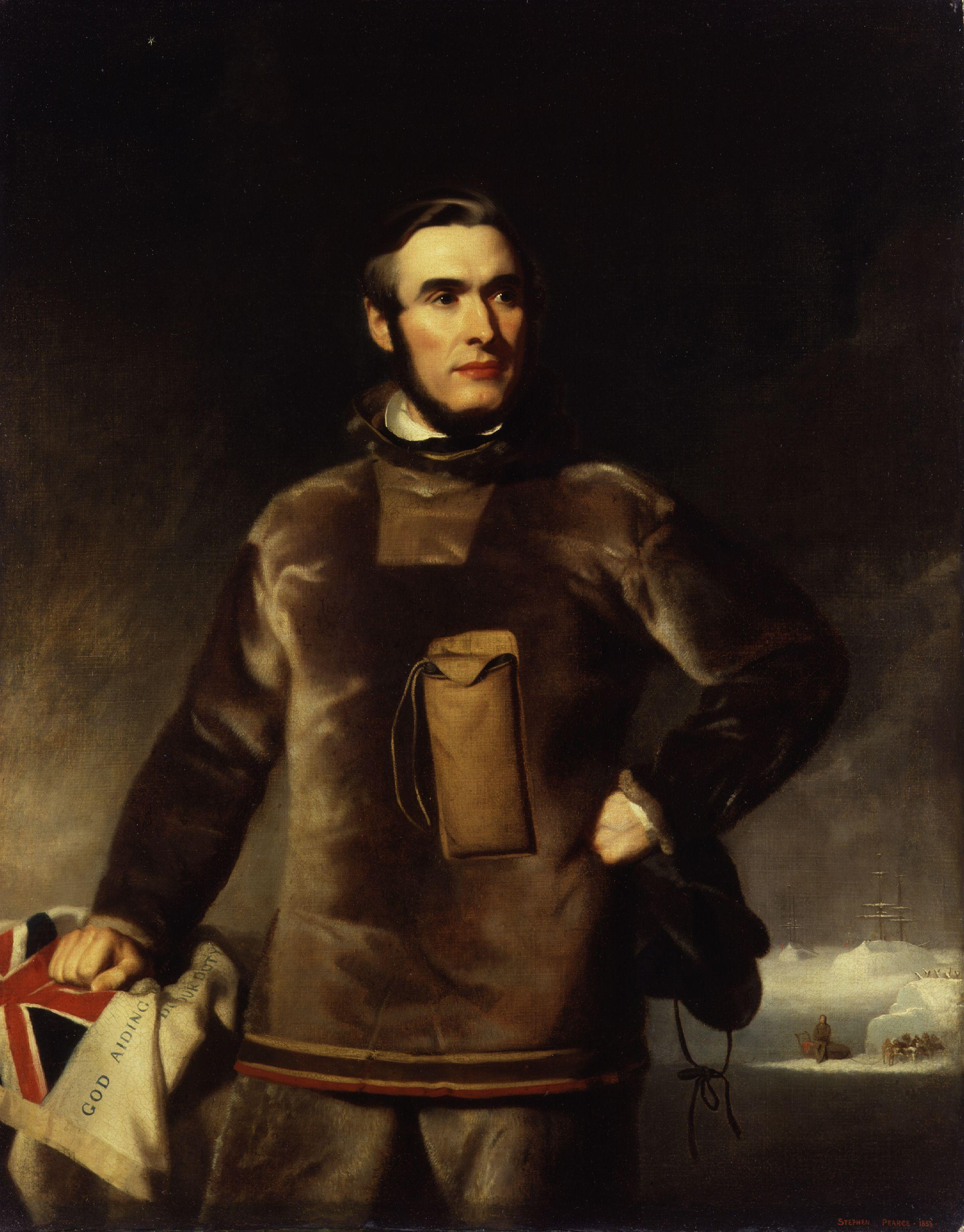
Cpt Penny in a portrait by Stephen Pearce

Captain William Penny (1809–1892) was a Scottish shipmaster, whaler and Arctic explorer. He undertook the first maritime search for the ships of Sir John Franklin. In 1840, Penny established the first whaling station in the Cumberland Sound area on Kekerten Island.

== Biography ==
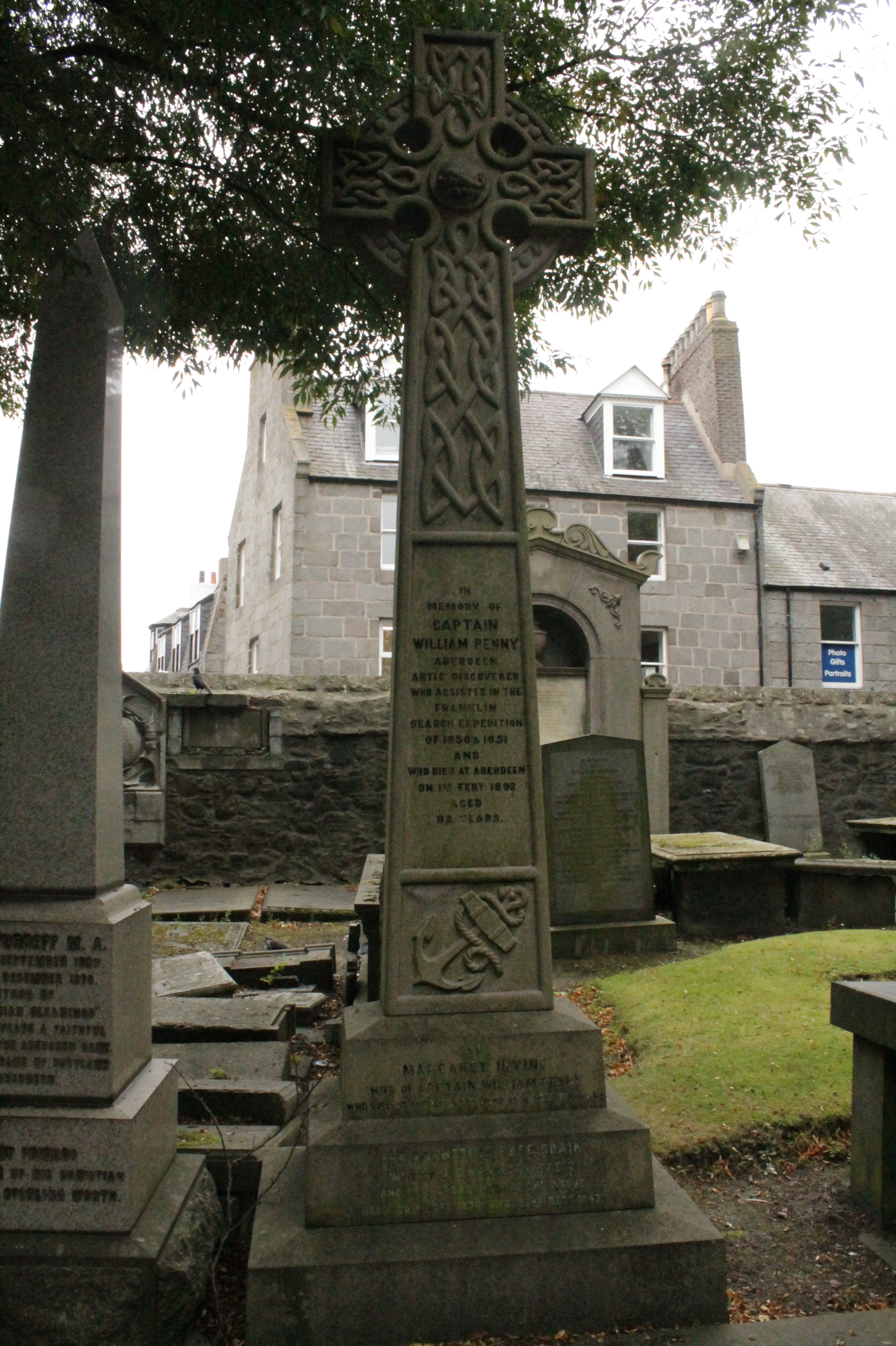
The grave of Cpt William Penny churchyard of the Kirk of St Nicholas, Aberdeen

He was born on 12 July 1809 in Peterhead. He went to sea at the age of 12 his first trip being on the whaler Alert on a trip to Greenland under the command of his father. In 1832 he served as mate on the whaler Traveller under Captain George Simpson in Lancaster Sound and Baffin Bay. On the latter trip in 1833 he was the first known European to see Exeter Sound.

By 1839 he was master of the whaler Neptune and was again in Baffin Bay searching for a whale-rich inlet called Tenudiakbeek, eventually locating in July and renaming it Hogarth's Sound. In fact he had rediscovered Cumberland Sound. After a three year break in Aberdeen he returned to Cumberland Sound in 1844. In 1847 he commanded the whaler St Andrew in Baffin Bay and began a search for the Franklin's lost expedition but failed to get through Lancaster Sound. He returned for a second search in 1849 on the Advice but was again turned back by ice.

In 1850/51, with the financial support of Lady Franklin, he returned in a more official capacity, searching in the Jones Sound and Wellington Channel and beyond Cape Walker. He was in charge of two brigs: HMS Lady Franklin and HMS Sophia. On this trip he joined forces with Captain Horatio Thomas Austin at Beechey Island. Here they found three graves from 1846 proving Franklin's presence.

They wintered at Assistance Bay on Cornwallis Island being joined by Sir John Ross. In spring Penny was charged with exploring the Wellington Channel. During this period he became the first European to see the Queens Channel and gave his name to the Penny Strait there. However, following a dispute with Austin he was forced to return to Scotland and took no further part in the search.

In 1852, he founded the "Royal Arctic Company" (later renamed the "Aberdeen Arctic Company") and was permitted to buy the Lady Franklin and Sophia for the company. He made the first ever winter whaling trip in the Arctic (1853/54) and introduced the practice of floe whaling, which allowed an earlier start to the season.

In 1857, he took the first Christian missionary (a Moravian) to convert the Inuit of Baffin Island and northern Greenland. In 1859 he introduced the first steam whalers. In 1861 he purchased the Dundee steamer Polynia as a whaler.

He retired in 1864 and thereafter lived at South Crown Street in Aberdeen. In later life he lived at 22 Springbank Terrace in Aberdeen.

== Personal life ==
He was married to Margaret Penny (née Irvine), and they had two sons and three daughters.

== Death and recognitions ==
He died on 1 February 1892 and is buried in the churchyard of the Kirk of St Nicholas in central Aberdeen. The grave lies west of the church and is marked by an obelisk relating his connection to the search for Franklin.

The Penny Ice Cap in Auyuittuq National Park on Baffin Island, Nunavut, Canada is named for him.
