= Robert Peel Inlet =

Inlet in Nunavut, Canada

Robert Peel Inlet 65°09′N 066°56′W is a body of water in Nunavut's Qikiqtaaluk Region. It lies in western Cumberland Sound, forming a wedge into Baffin Island's Hall Peninsula. There are many irregularly shaped islands at the mouth of the inlet.
