= Cumberland Peninsula =

Peninsula in Nunavut, Canada

Coordinates: 66°30′N 065°00′W

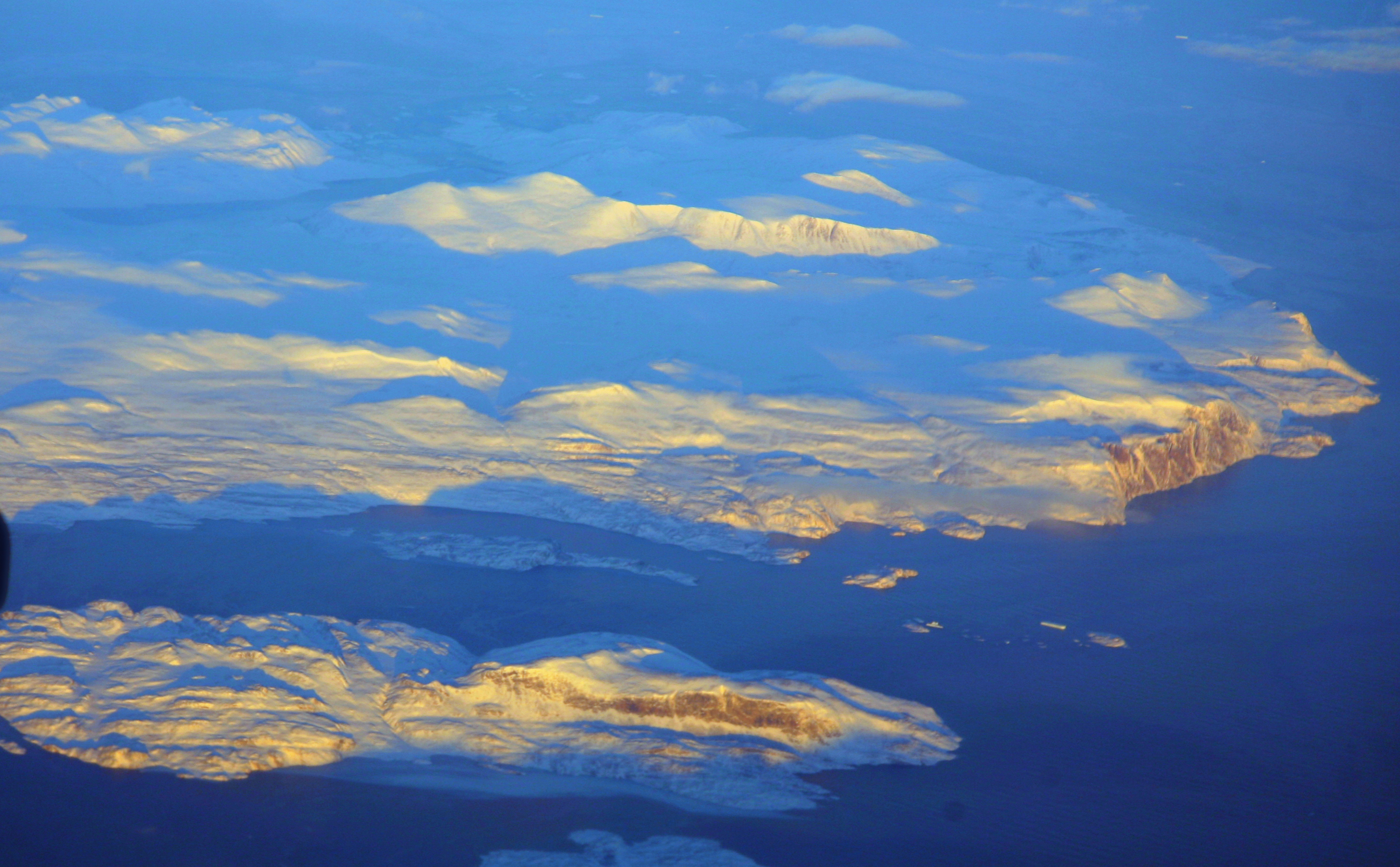
Cumberland Peninsula of Baffin Island, aerial photo by Doc Searls.

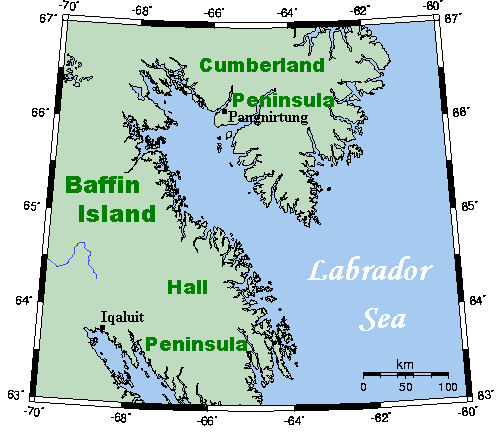

Cumberland Peninsula is a peninsula in the southeastern part of Baffin Island in Nunavut, Canada. It is located between 64°56' and 67°57' north latitude, and 61°56' to 68° west longitude. The Arctic Circle crosses the peninsula, with the Labrador Sea to the southeast, and the Davis Strait to the east, which lies between the peninsula and Greenland. The Cumberland Sound lies to the southwest, separating the Cumberland Peninsula from the Hall Peninsula, which is also part of Baffin Island.

The Cumberland Peninsula is part of the Arctic Tundra biome—the world's coldest and driest biome—as is the rest of Baffin Island. The terrain is mountainous, and Mt. Odin, near the Arctic Circle, rises 7,044 ft (2,147 m).

The peninsula is home to Pangnirtung, which lies on the southwest coast, and the Auyuittuq National Park.
