= Cumberland Sound =

Arctic waterway in Qikiqtaaluk Region, Nunavut, Canada

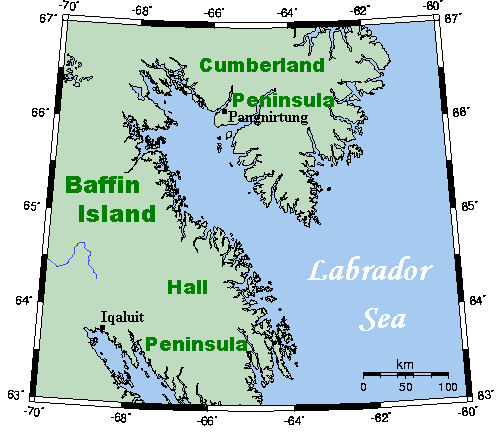
- Cumberland Sound, a part of the Labrador Sea, between Cumberland Peninsula and Hall Peninsula.

- Location within Nunavut Location within Canada
- Location: Labrador Sea
- Coordinates: 65°20′N 066°01′W
- Ocean/sea sources: Atlantic Ocean
- Basin countries: Canada
- Settlements: Pangnirtung

Cumberland Sound (French: Baie Cumberland; Inuit: Kangiqtualuk) is an Arctic waterway in the Qikiqtaaluk Region, Nunavut, Canada. It is a western arm of the Labrador Sea located between Baffin Island's Hall Peninsula and the Cumberland Peninsula. It is approximately 250 km (160 mi) long and 80 km (50 mi) wide. Other names are Cumberland Straits, Hogarth Sound, and Northumberland Inlet.

Small islands litter the stretch of water which was formed from glacial activity and meltwater produced from the receding glacier.

The only settlement located on the shore of the sound on the Cumberland Peninsula is Pangnirtung.

John Davis, the English explorer, went part way up the sound in 1585. After that it was unvisited by Europeans until 1839, when the British whaler and explorer William Penny persuaded Eenoolooapik (brother of interpreter and guide Taqulittuq) to show him the inland sea. The Inuk had described the sound, known to him as Tenudiackbeek, as full of whales, and soon the British set up a whaling station there.

== Fauna ==
Two whale species reside in the sound year-round – the Cumberland Sound beluga and the bowhead whale. Other notable species include marine mammals such as the ringed, bearded, harp, harbour and hooded seals, as well as the polar bear. Significant fish populations include Arctic char and Greenland halibut. Birds such as gulls, ducks, and geese migrate and spend the springs and summers in Cumberland Sound, while birds such as ptarmigan and ravens remain year-round.
