= Lille Kari Rock =

Rock of Bouvet Island

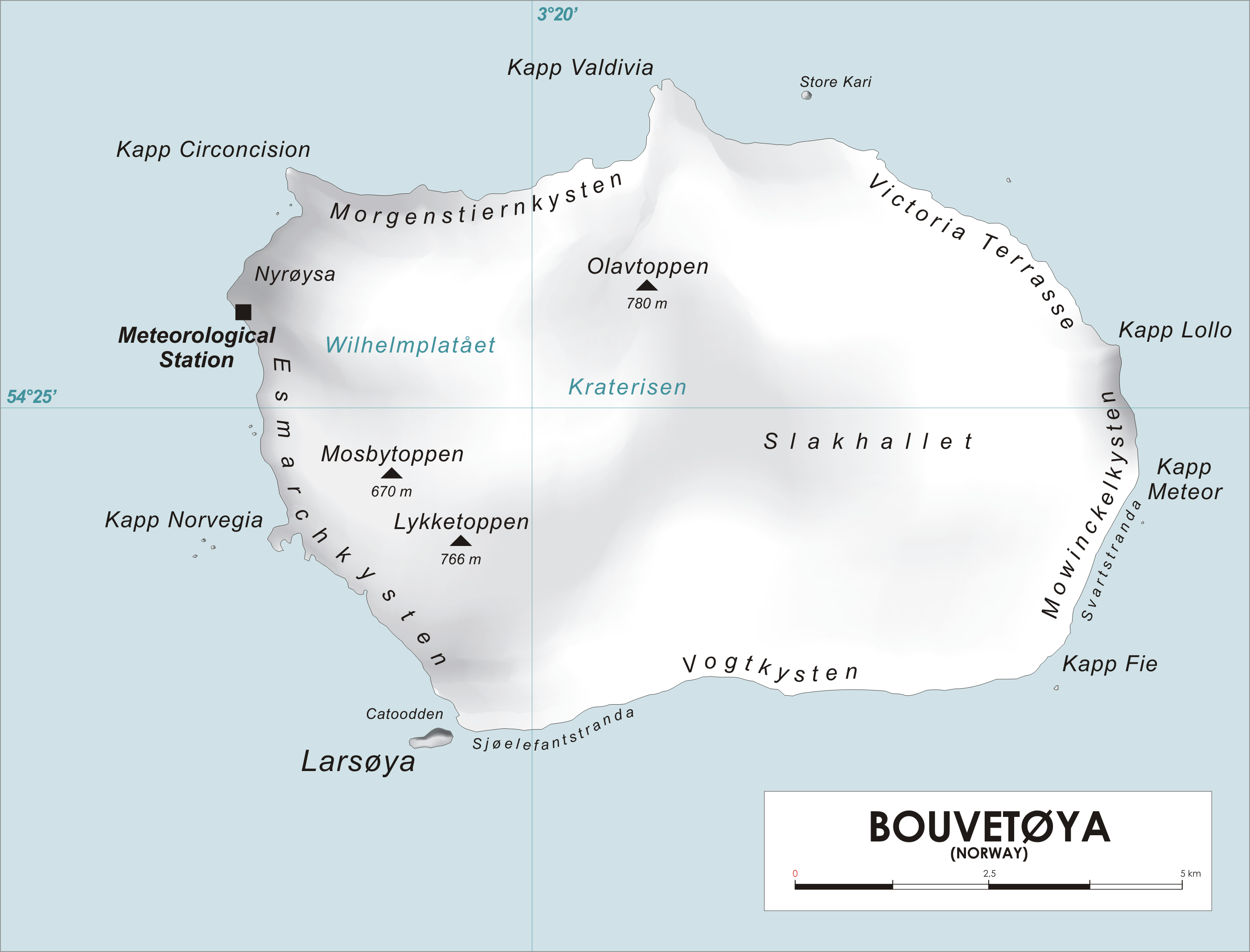
Map of Bouvetøya

Lille Kari Rock (54°24′S 3°28′E) is an insular rock 2 metres (7 ft) high which lies 1.2 nautical miles (2.2 km) northwest of Cape Lollo on the island of Bouvetøya in the South Atlantic Ocean. It was charted from the ship Norvegia in December 1927 by a Norwegian expedition under Captain Harald Horntvedt, and was named by Horntvedt in association with Store Kari Rock which lies 1 nautical mile (2 km) westward.
