= Mowinckelkysten =

Beach on Bouvet Island

Coordinates: 54.4280°S 3.4283°E

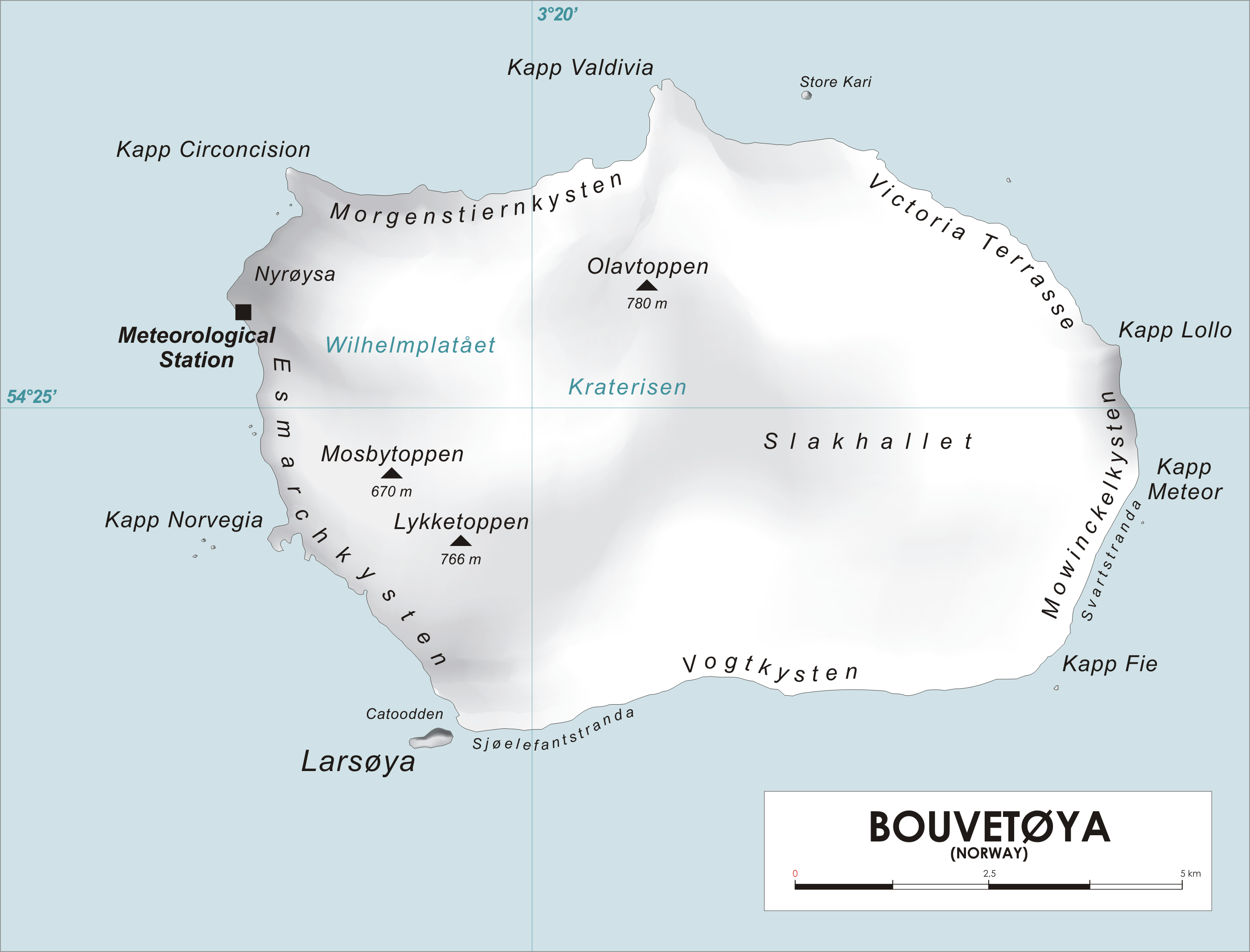
Map of Bouvetøya

Mowinckelkysten is a coastal area at the southeastern side of the island of Bouvetøya. It is named after Johan Ludwig Mowinckel, the Norwegian Prime Minister at the time when Norwegian sovereignty over the island was established. It extends from Kapp Fie to Kapp Lollo. The coast includes Kapp Meteor, the easternmost point of the island. South of Kapp Meteor is the black sandy beach Svartstranda.
