= Olavtoppen =

Mountain on Bouvet Island

Coordinates: 54°25′14″S 3°23′13″E

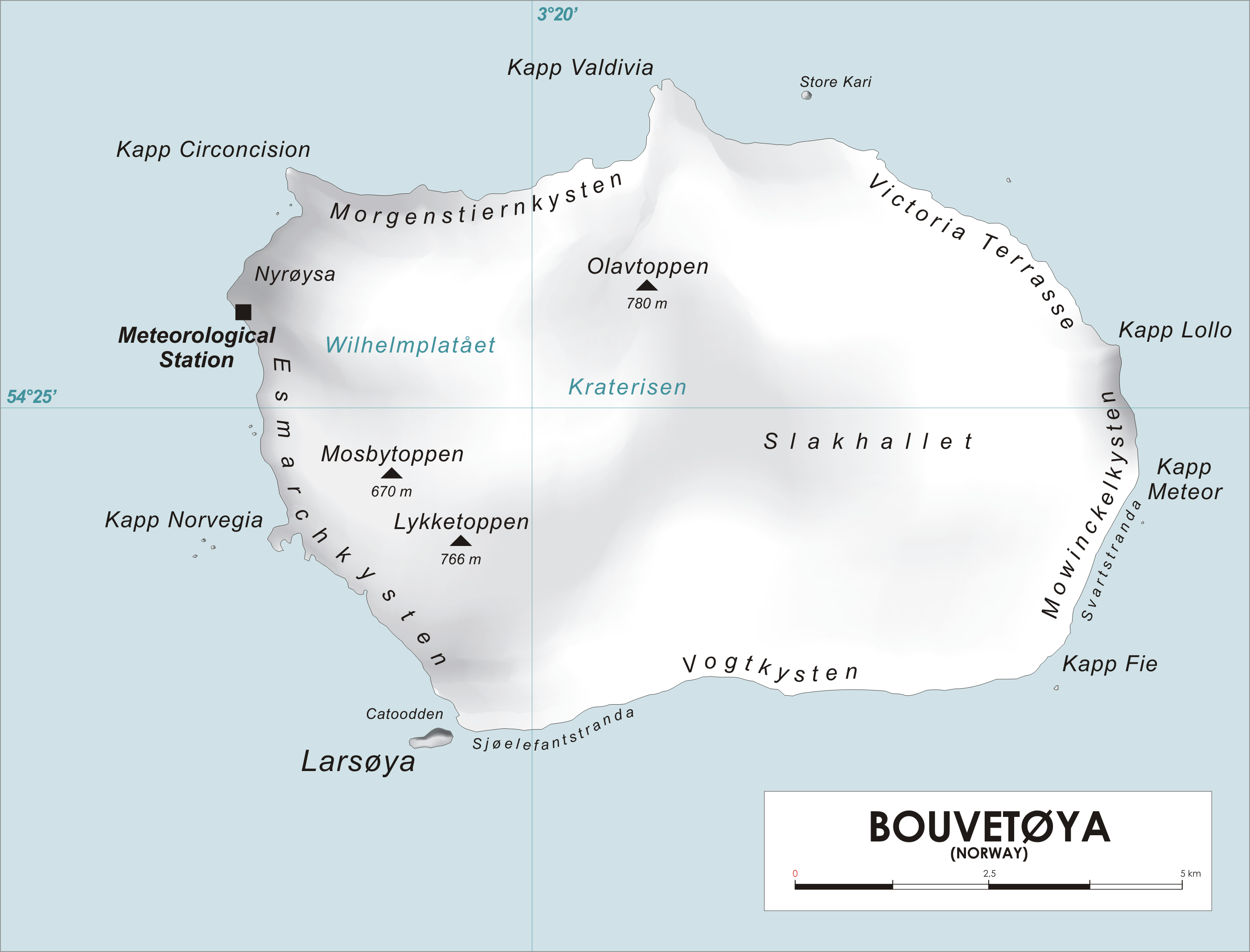
Map of Bouvet Island

Olavtoppen, occasionally anglicised as Olav Peak, is the highest point of Bouvet Island, a volcanic island and dependency of Norway, and the remotest island on Earth. Olavtoppen is located north of the center of the island, immediately south of Kapp Valdivia, and rises 780 meters (2,560 ft) above sea level. It was first ascended on 21 February 2012 by Aaron Halstead, Bruno Rodi and Jason Rodi Olavtoppen is ranked 36th by topographic isolation.
