= Røver Anchorage =

Røver Anchorage (54°27′S 3°21′E) is an open anchorage along the southwest coast of Bouvetøya, approximately midway between Norvegia Point and Lars Island. The anchorage was used in December 1927 by the Norvegia, the vessel of the Norwegian expedition under Captain Harald Horntvedt. They named it Røverhullet ("robber's hole"), a name suggesting a place where only pirates would feel at home.
