= Lykketoppen =

Mountain on Bouvet Island

Coordinates: 54°27′S 3°23′E

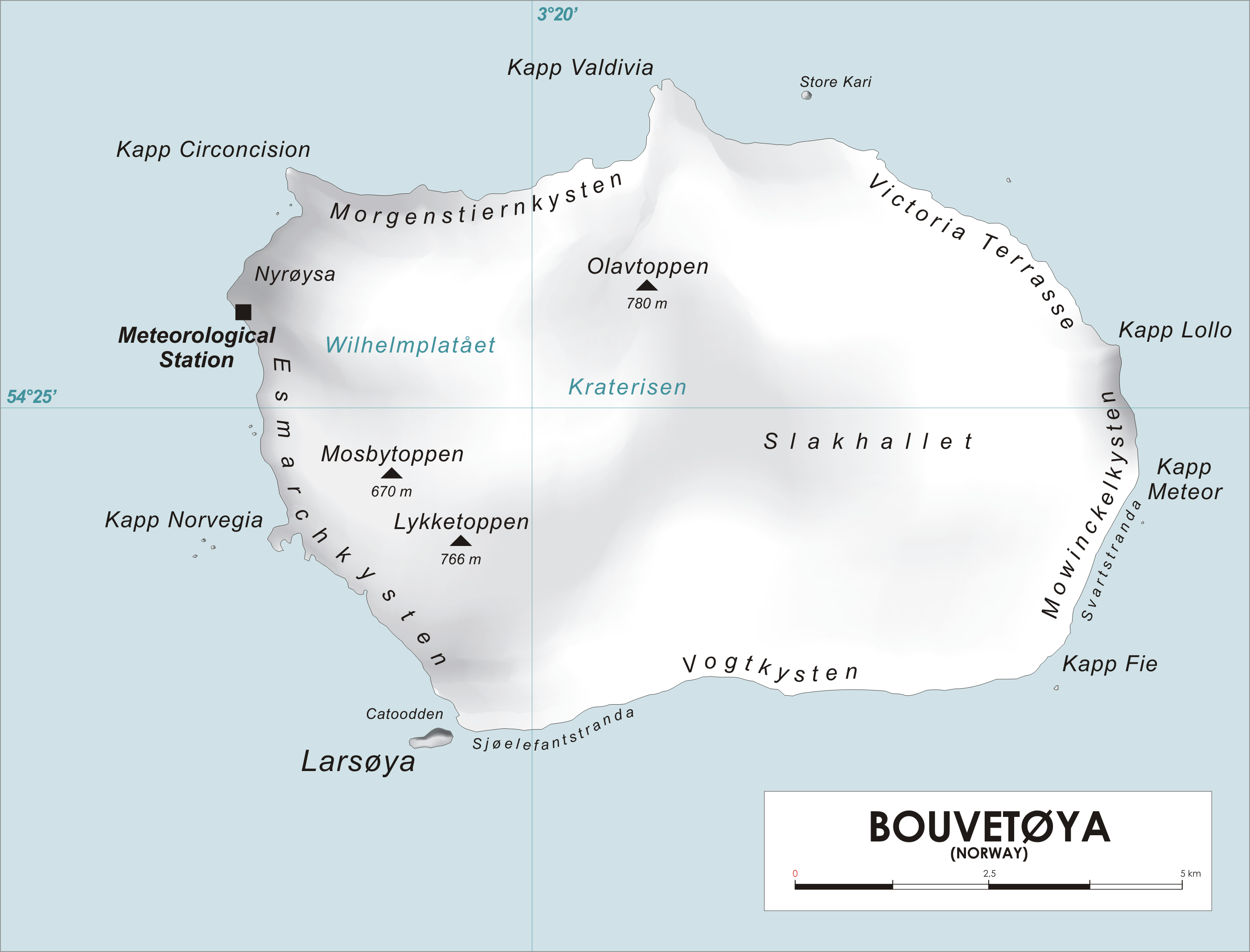
Map of Bouvetøya

Lykketoppen, occasionally anglicized as Lykke Peak, is a snow-covered, 765-meter (2,510 ft) tall summit that surmounts the southwest part of Bouvetøya, standing 1 nautical mile (2 km) east of Norvegia Point. It was first roughly charted in 1898 by a German expedition under Carl Chun, and was recharted and named in December 1927 by the First Norvegia Expedition under Captain Harald Horntvedt.
