= Norvegia Rock =

Offshore rock formation of Bouvet Island

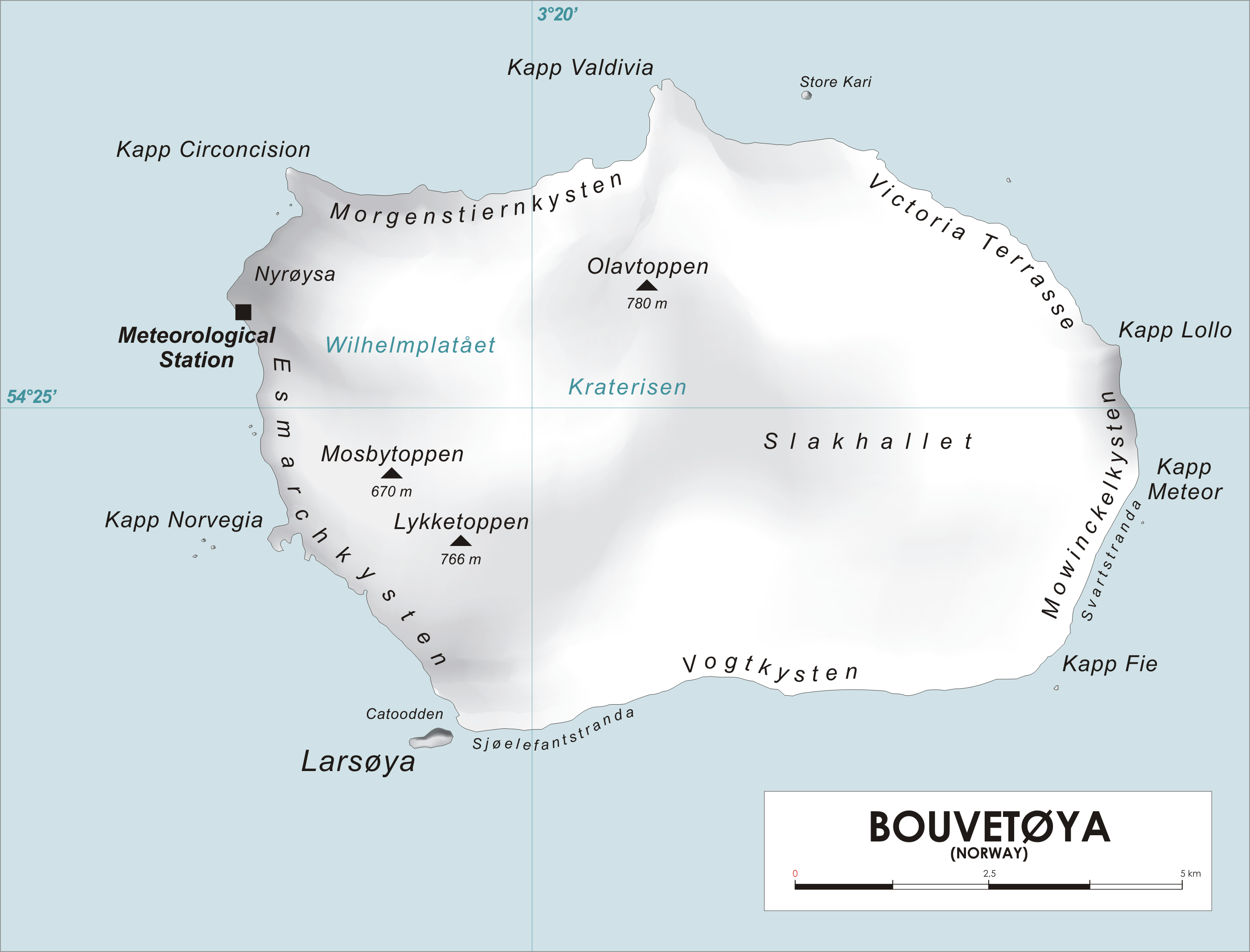
Map of Bouvetøya

Norvegia Rock (54°24′S 3°25′E) is a submerged rock with less than 2 m of water over it, lying off the north coast of the island of Bouvetøya, approximately 0.5 nautical miles (0.9 km) east-northeast of Cape Valdivia. Norvegia I, the ship of the Norwegian expedition under Captain Harald Horntvedt, struck a rock here on December 3, 1927. Named by the expedition after the Norvegia I.
