= Norris Reef =

Naming and charting

Map of Bouvetøya with Norris Reef (Norrisrevet)

Norris Reef (54°25′S 3°20′E) is a reef lying close off the western shore of the island of Bouvetøya, 0.5 nautical miles (0.9 km) southwest of Cape Circoncision. First charted in 1898 by a German expedition under Carl Chun. Recharted in December 1927 by a Norwegian expedition under Captain Harald Horntvedt. Named by the Norwegians after British sealer Captain George Norris who, commanding the sealers Sprightly and Lively, visited Bouvetoya in 1825.

== Other sources ==
- Simpson-Housley, Paul (2002) Antarctica: Exploration, Perception and Metaphor (Routledge) ISBN 9781134891214
