= Bolle Bay =

Bay in Bouvet Island

Map of Bouvetøya with Bolle Bay (Bollevika Bay)

Bolle Bay (54°27′S 3°21′E) is a cove indenting the western shore of Bouvetøya, entered on the southern side of Norvegia Point. Roughly charted in 1898 by the German expedition under Carl Chun, it was re-charted and named in December 1927 by a Norwegian expedition under Captain Harald Horntvedt.

== Other sources ==
- Simpson-Housley, Paul (2002) Antarctica: Exploration, Perception and Metaphor (Routledge) ISBN 9781134891214
