= Store Kari Rock =

Store Kari Rock (54°24′S 3°26′E) is an insular rock 3 m high off the northern side of Bouvetøya. It lies 0.8 nautical miles (1.5 km) east of Cape Valdivia. Charted from the ship Norvegia in December 1927 by a Norwegian expedition under Captain Harald Horntvedt. Named by Horntvedt in association with Lille Kari Rock which lies 1 nautical mile (1.9 km) eastward.
