= Sachse Rocks =

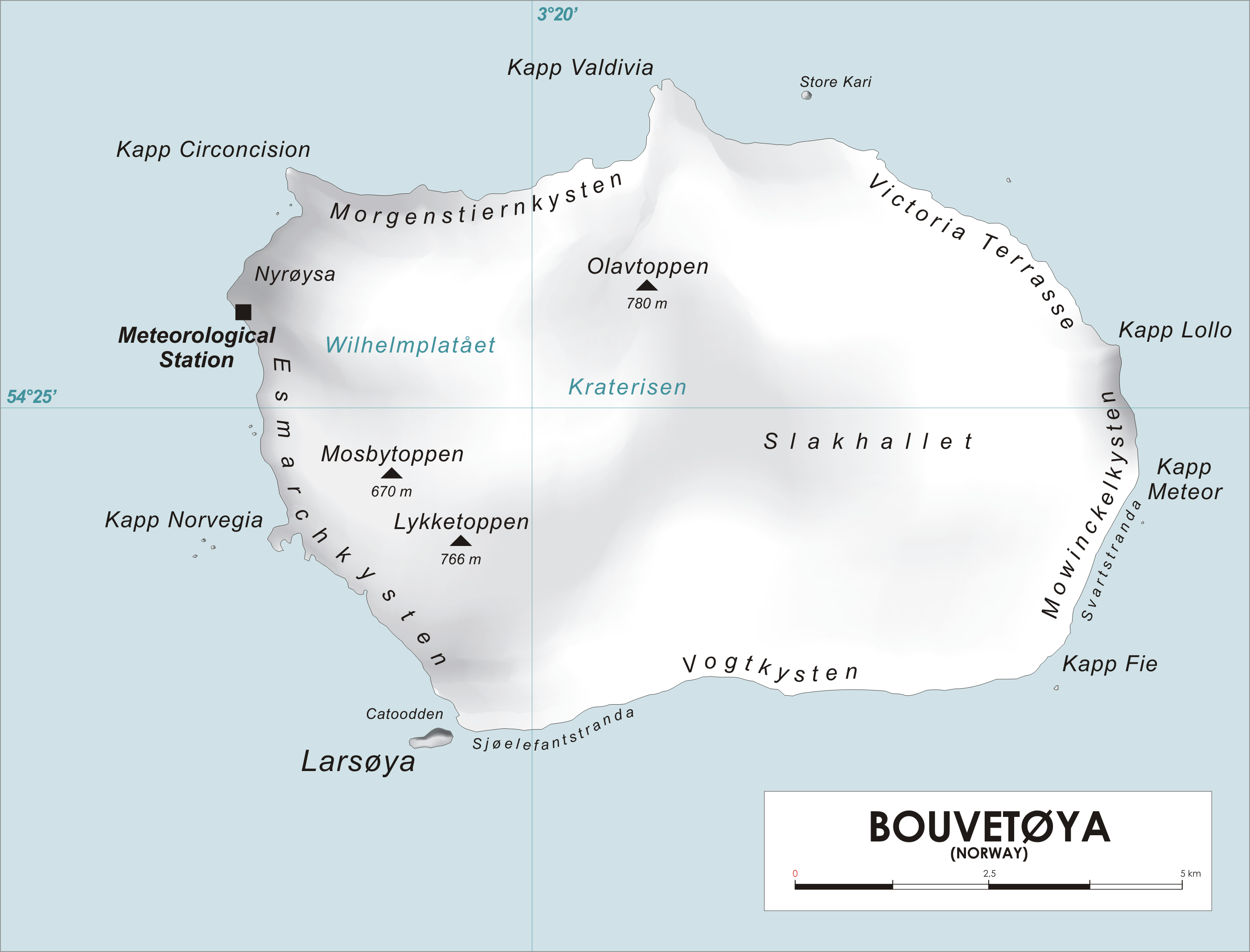
Map of Bouvetøya

Sachse Rocks (54°24′S 3°25′E) is a group of submerged rocks which lie close to the northern coast of the island of Bouvetoya and approximately 0.2 miles (0.3 km) southeast of Cape Valdivia. The rocks were charted and named by the Norwegian expedition, 1927–28, under Captain Harald Horntvedt. Named for Walter Sachse, a navigation officer on the German vessel SS Valdivia who in 1898 accurately fixed the position of the island for the first time.

== Other sources ==
- Simpson-Housley, Paul (2002) Antarctica: Exploration, Perception and Metaphor (Routledge) ISBN 9781134891214
