= Benn Skerries =

Island in Norway

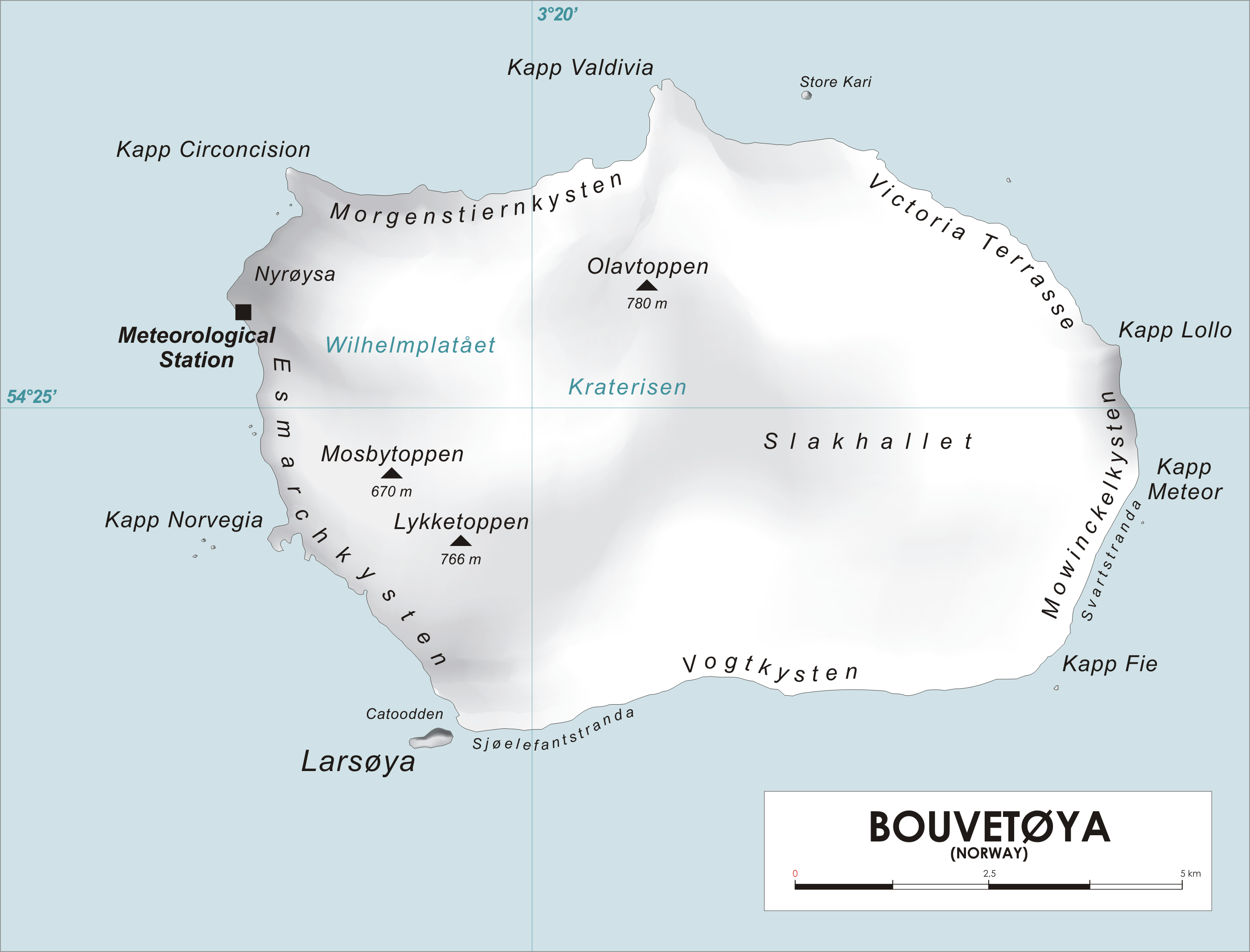
Map of Bouvetøya

Benn Skerries (54°27′S 3°20′E) are a small group of rocks which extend up to 0.25 nautical miles (0.5 km) westward from Norvegia Point on the island of Bouvetøya. They were charted and named in December 1927 by a Norwegian expedition in the Norvegia under Captain Harald Horntvedt.
