= Morrell Reef =

Reef near Bouvet Island

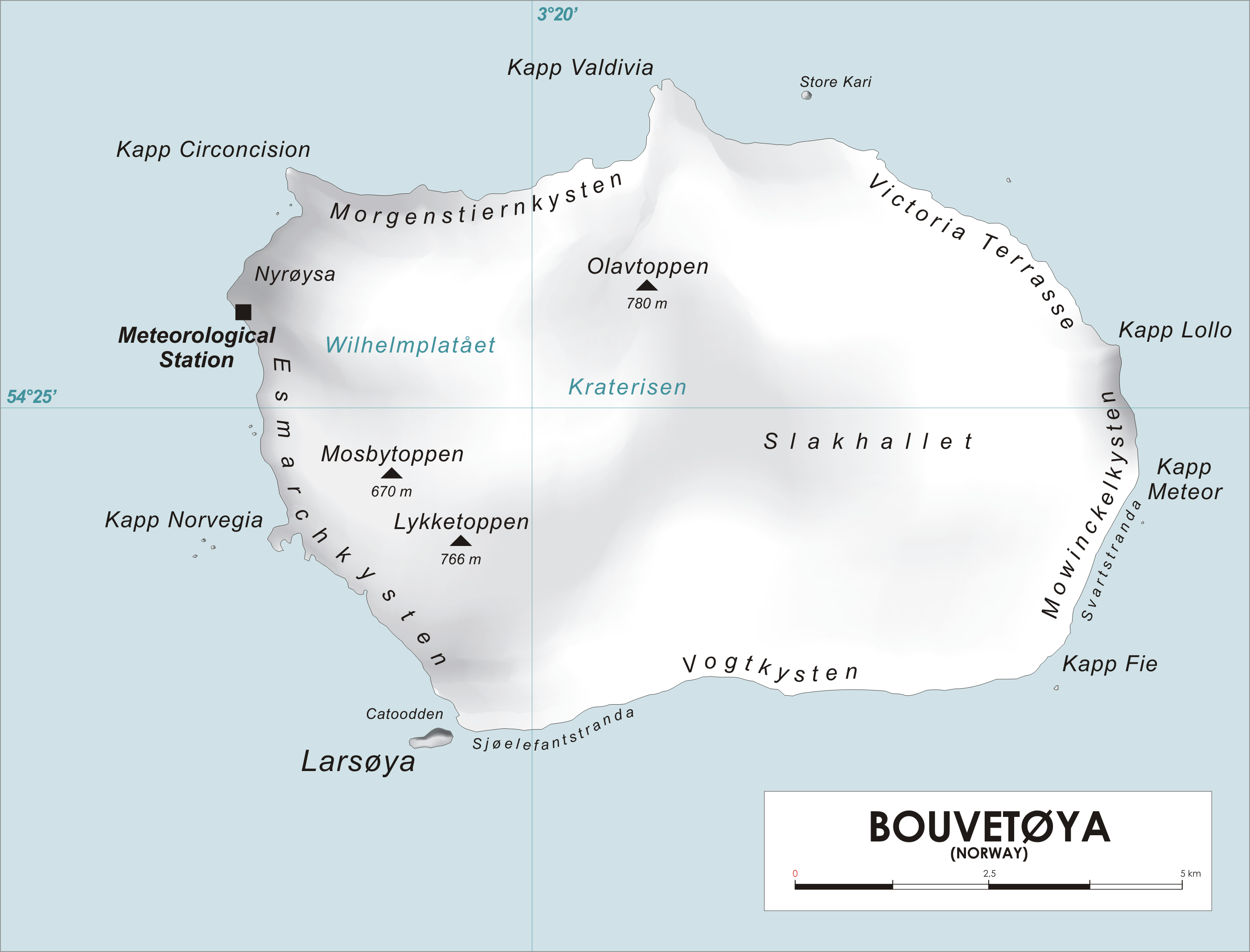
Map of Bouvetøya

Morrell Reef (54°27′S 3°29′E) is a reef reported to lie close off the southeast coast of Bouvetøya, about 0.4 nautical miles (0.7 km) northward of Cape Fie. It was first charted in 1898 by a German expedition under Carl Chun, and was recharted in December 1927 by a Norwegian expedition under Captain Harald Horntvedt. The reef was named by the Norwegians after Captain Benjamin Morrell, an American sealer who visited the northwest side of Bouvetøya in the Wasp in 1822, perhaps making the first landing on the island.

== Other sources ==
- Simpson-Housley, Paul (2002) Antarctica: Exploration, Perception and Metaphor (Routledge) ISBN 9781134891214
