= Williams Reef =

Reef in Norway

Coordinates: 54°28′S 3°28′E

Map of Bouvetøya with Williams Reef (Williamsrevet)

Williams Reef is a reef which extends southward for about 0.5 nautical miles (0.9 km) from Cape Fie in the island of Bouvetøya. The reef was charted in 1898 by a German expedition in the Valdivia under Carl Chun. It was recharted in December 1927 by a Norwegian expedition and named for Captain John Williams, an American sealer who had visited Bouvetoya in the schooner Golden West in 1878, making a landing on the island.
