= Dependencies of Norway =

Territories of Norway in the Southern Hemisphere

Dependency Biland
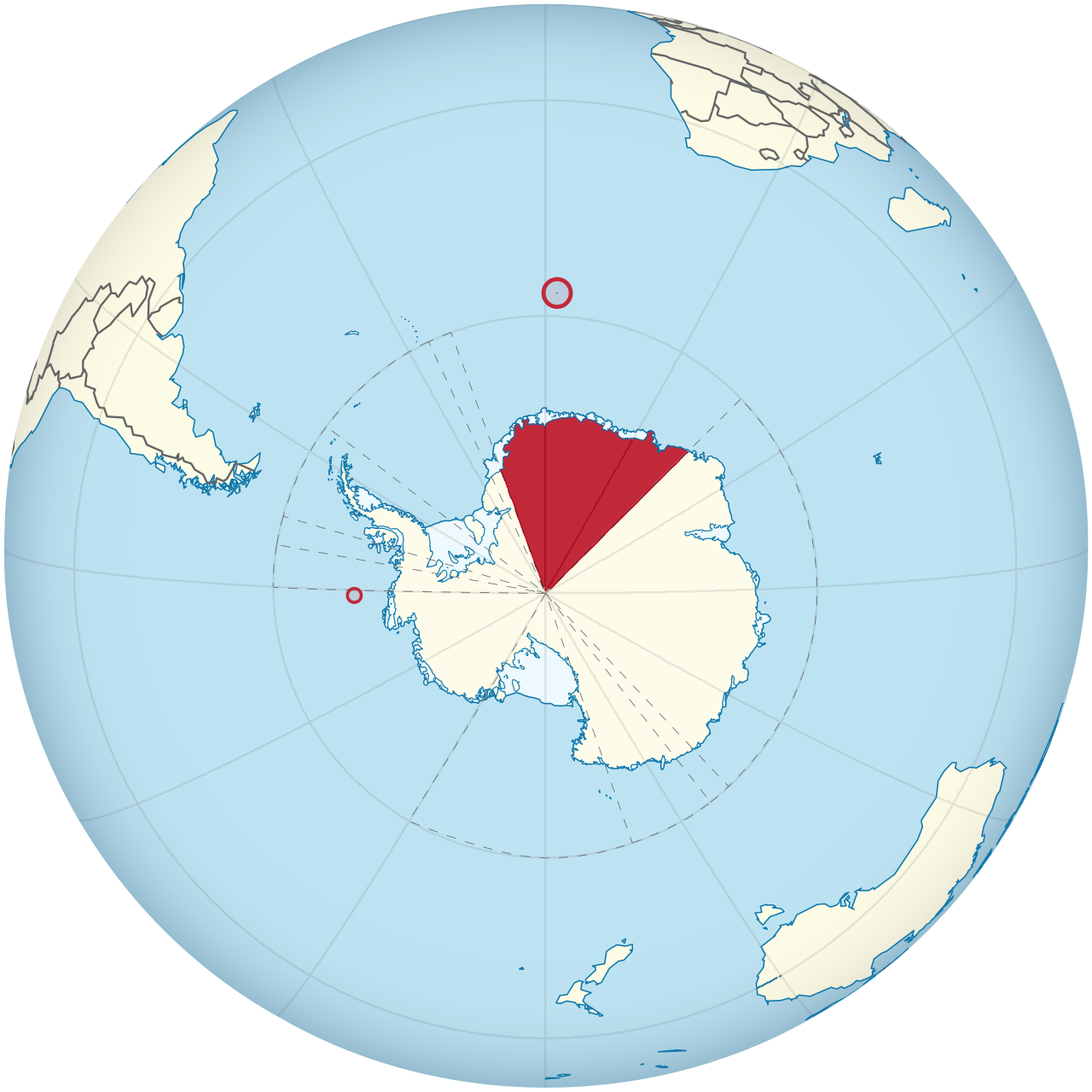
- Dependencies of Norway (red)
- Largest settlements: None (several active research stations)
- Dependencies: Bouvet Island; Peter I Island; Queen Maud Land

Leaders
  - Monarch: Haakon VIII
  - Administrators: Ministry of Justice and Public Security

Area
  - Total: 2,700,203 km^{2} (1,042,554 sq mi)

Population
  - Estimate: Around 40 scientists

Norway has three dependent territories (Norwegian: biland), all uninhabited and located in the Southern Hemisphere. Bouvet Island (Bouvetøya) is a sub-Antarctic island in the South Atlantic Ocean. Queen Maud Land is the sector of Antarctica between the 20th meridian west and the 45th meridian east. Peter I Island is a volcanic island located 450 kilometres (280 mi) off the coast of Ellsworth Land of continental Antarctica. Despite being unincorporated areas, neither Svalbard nor Jan Mayen is formally considered a dependency. While the Svalbard Treaty regulates some aspects of that Arctic territory, it acknowledges that the islands are part of Norway. Similarly, Jan Mayen is recognized as an integral part of Norway.

Both Peter I Island and Queen Maud Land are south of 60°S and are thus part of the Antarctic Treaty System. While the treaty does not affect these claims, the only states that recognize Norwegian sovereignty also have Antarctic claims. Administration of the dependencies is handled by the Polar Affairs Department of the Ministry of Justice and Public Security in Oslo. Norwegian criminal law, private law and procedural law apply to the dependencies, as do other laws that explicitly state they are valid on the dependencies.

== Government and regulations ==
The dependency status entails that each is not part of the Kingdom of Norway but still under Norwegian sovereignty. Specifically, this implies that a dependency can be ceded without violating the first article of the Constitution of Norway. Norwegian administration is handled by the Polar Affairs Department of the Ministry of Justice and the Police, located in Oslo.

The Dependency Act of 24 March 1933 establishes that Norwegian criminal law, private law and procedural law apply to the dependencies, as do other laws that explicitly state they are valid in each dependency. The act further establishes that all land in the dependencies belongs to the state, and prohibits the storage and detonation of nuclear products. Since 5 May 1995, Norwegian law has required all Norwegian activity in Antarctica, including Peter I Island and Queen Maud Land, follow international environmental law for Antarctica. All Norwegian citizens who plan activities must therefore report them the Norwegian Polar Institute, which may deny any non-conforming activity. All people visiting the area must follow laws regarding protection of nature, treatment of waste, pollution and insurance for search and rescue operations.

Bouvetøya has been designated with the ISO 3166-2 code BV and was subsequently awarded the country code top-level domain .bv on 21 August 1997.

== History ==
- On 14 December 1911 five Norwegians, under the leadership of Roald Amundsen, were the first to reach the South Pole.
- Bouvet Island was claimed in 1927 (formally in 1930; in 1935 the island was declared a nature reserve for seals).
- Peter I Island was claimed in 1929 (formally in 1931).
- Queen Maud Land (45°E to 20°E) was formally claimed as a Norwegian possession on 14 January 1938.
- King Harald V became the first reigning monarch to visit Antarctica. He visited Queen Maud Land in 2015.

== Areas ==
=== Bouvetøya ===
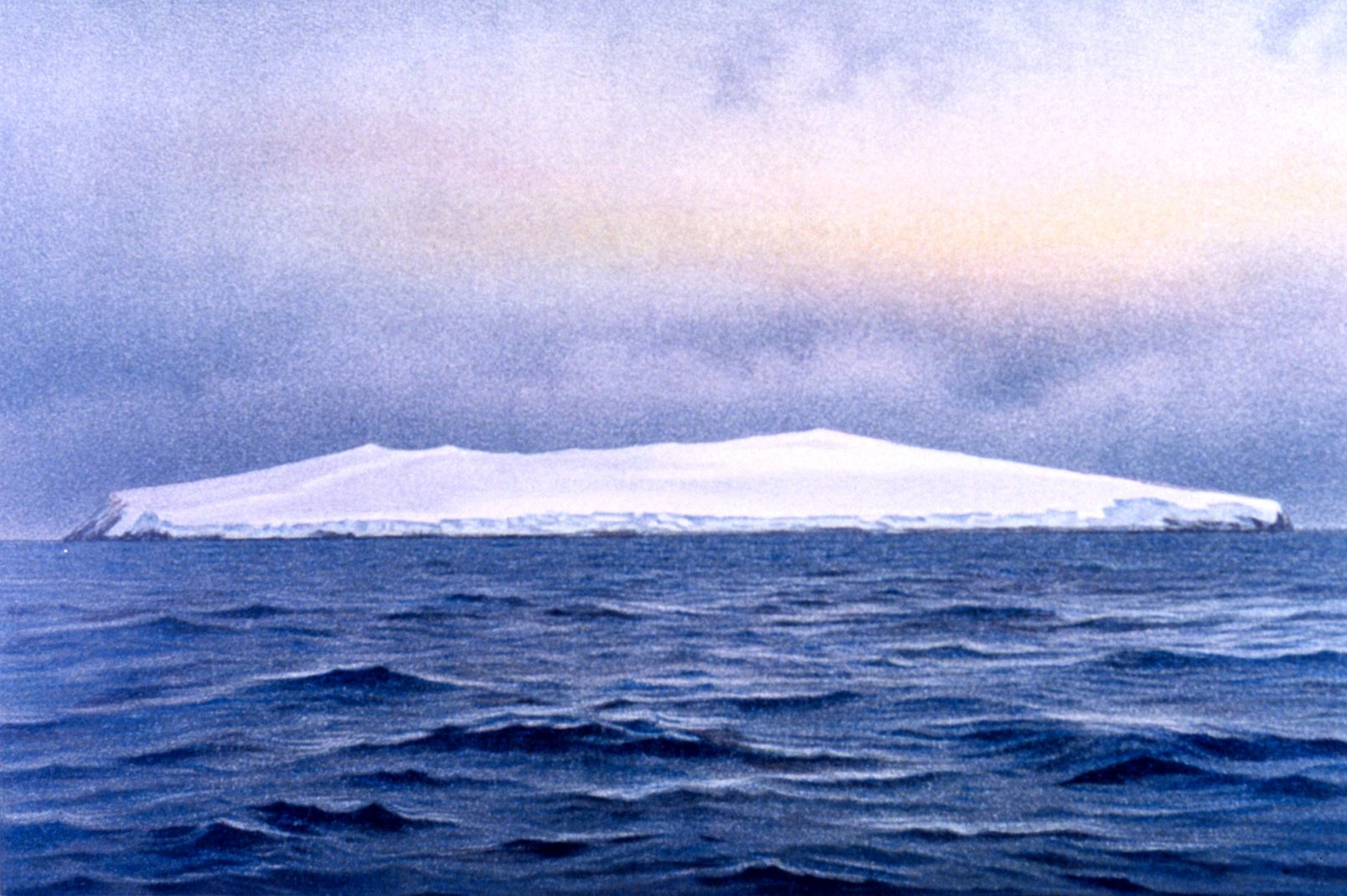
Southeast coast of Bouvet Island in 1898

Bouvetøya (Bouvet Island) is an uninhabited subantarctic volcanic island located in the southern end of the Mid-Atlantic Ridge, either in the South Atlantic Ocean or the Southern Ocean, depending on definition. It is the most remote island in the world, approximately 2,200 kilometres (1,400 mi) south-southwest off the coast of South Africa and approximately 1,700 kilometres (1,100 mi) north of the Princess Astrid Coast of Queen Maud Land, Antarctica. The island has an area of 49 square kilometres (19 sq mi), of which 93 percent is covered by a glacier. The center of the island is an ice-filled crater of an inactive volcano.

Some skerries and one smaller island, Larsøya, lie along the coast. Nyrøysa, created by a rock slide in the late 1950s, is the only easy place to land and is the location of a weather station. Landing on the island is very difficult, as it normally experiences high seas and features a steep coast. During the winter, it is surrounded by pack ice. The exclusive economic zone surrounding the island covers an area of 441,163 square kilometres (170,334 sq mi).

=== Peter I Island ===
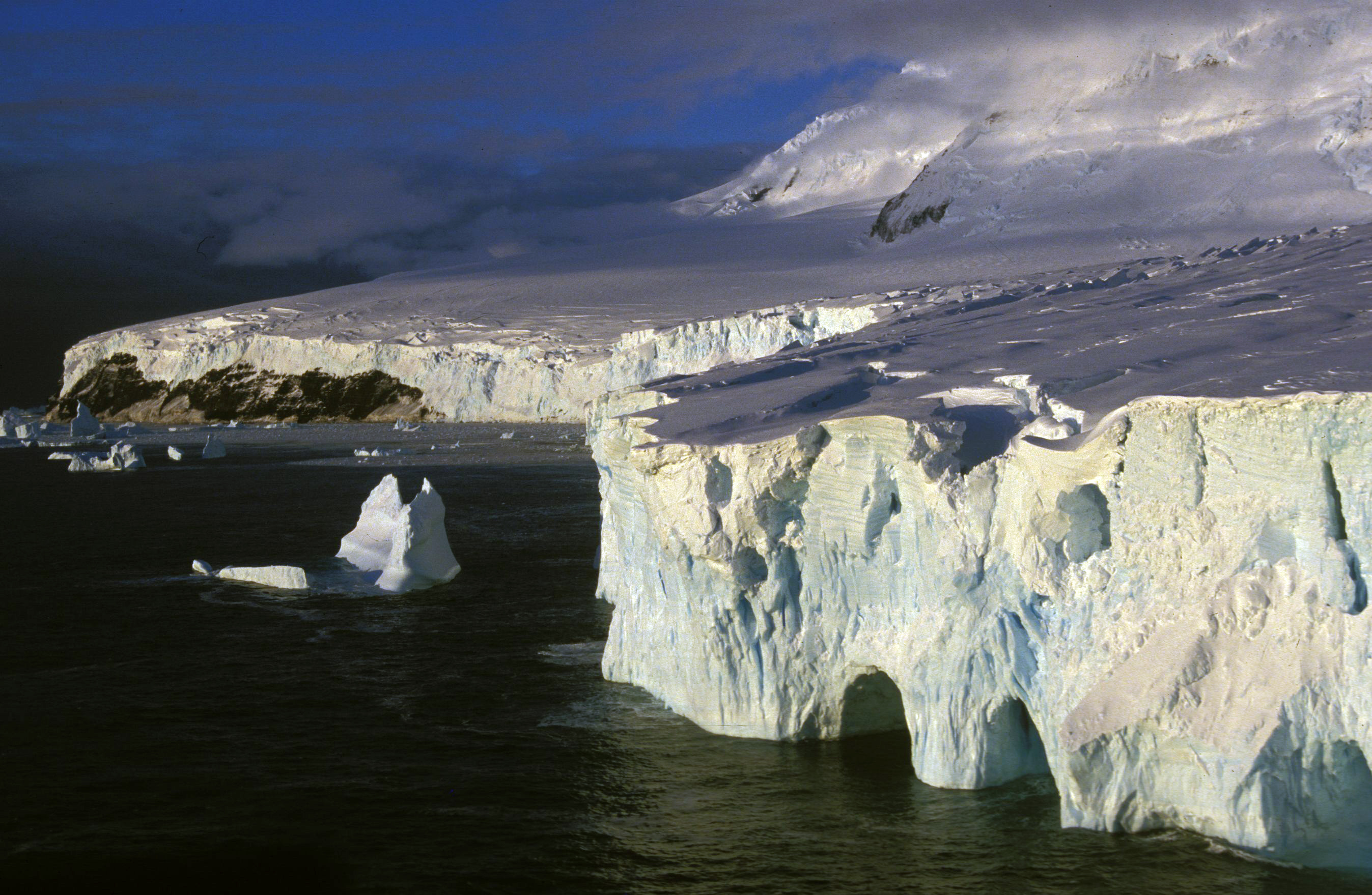
Coastline of Peter I Island, visited during an expedition of RV Polarstern in 1994.

Peter I Island is a volcanic island located 450 kilometres (280 mi) off the coast of Ellsworth Land of continental Antarctica. It has an area of 154 square kilometres (59 sq mi). The island is almost entirely covered by glacier, with about 95% of the surface covered by ice. Surrounding the island is a 40-metre (130 ft) tall ice front and vertical cliffs. The long stretches of ice caps are supplemented with rock outcrops. Landing is only possible at three points, and only during the short period of the year in which the island is not surrounded by pack ice. The island is a shield volcano, although it is not known if it is still active. An ultra prominent peak at 1,640 metres (5,380 ft) elevation, it is named for Lars Christensen. Peter I Island is the only claim between 90°W and 150°W and is also the only claim that is not a sector.

=== Queen Maud Land ===
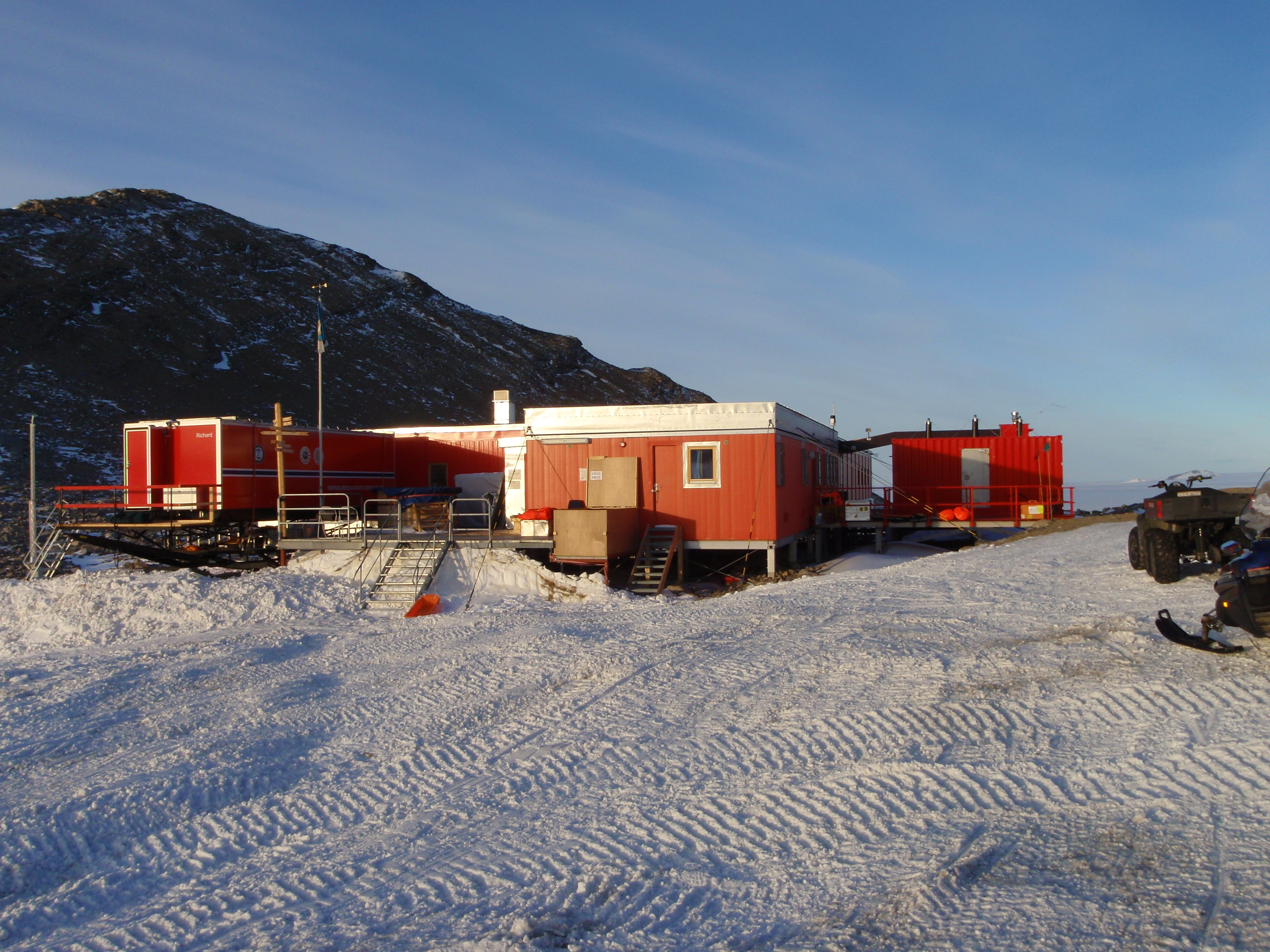
Norway's main research station, Troll, in Queen Maud Land.

Queen Maud Land is a 2.7 million km^{2} (1.7 million sq mi) sector of Antarctica. The territory lies between 20° west and 45° east, between the British Antarctic Territory to the west and the Australian Antarctic Territory to the east. The latitudinal limits of the territory are not officially defined. Positioned in East Antarctica, the territory comprises one-sixth of the total area of Antarctica.

Most of the territory is covered by the Antarctic ice sheet, and a tall ice wall stretches throughout its coast. In some areas further within the ice sheet, mountain ranges breach through the ice, allowing for birds to breed and the growth of a limited flora. The region is divided into the Princess Martha Coast, Princess Astrid Coast, Princess Ragnhild Coast, Prince Harald Coast and Prince Olav Coast. Off the coast is King Haakon VII Sea. There is no ice-free land at the coast; the coast consists of a 20-to-30-metre-high (66 to 98 ft) wall of ice throughout almost the entire territory.

There is no permanent population, although there are 12 active research stations housing a maximum average of 40 scientists, the numbers fluctuating depending on the season. Six are occupied year-round, while the remainder are seasonal summer stations. The main aerodromes for intercontinental flights, corresponding with Cape Town, South Africa, are Troll Airfield, near the Norwegian Troll research station, and a runway at the Russian Novolazarevskaya Station.
