= Spiess Rocks =

Submerged rock formation of Bouvet Island

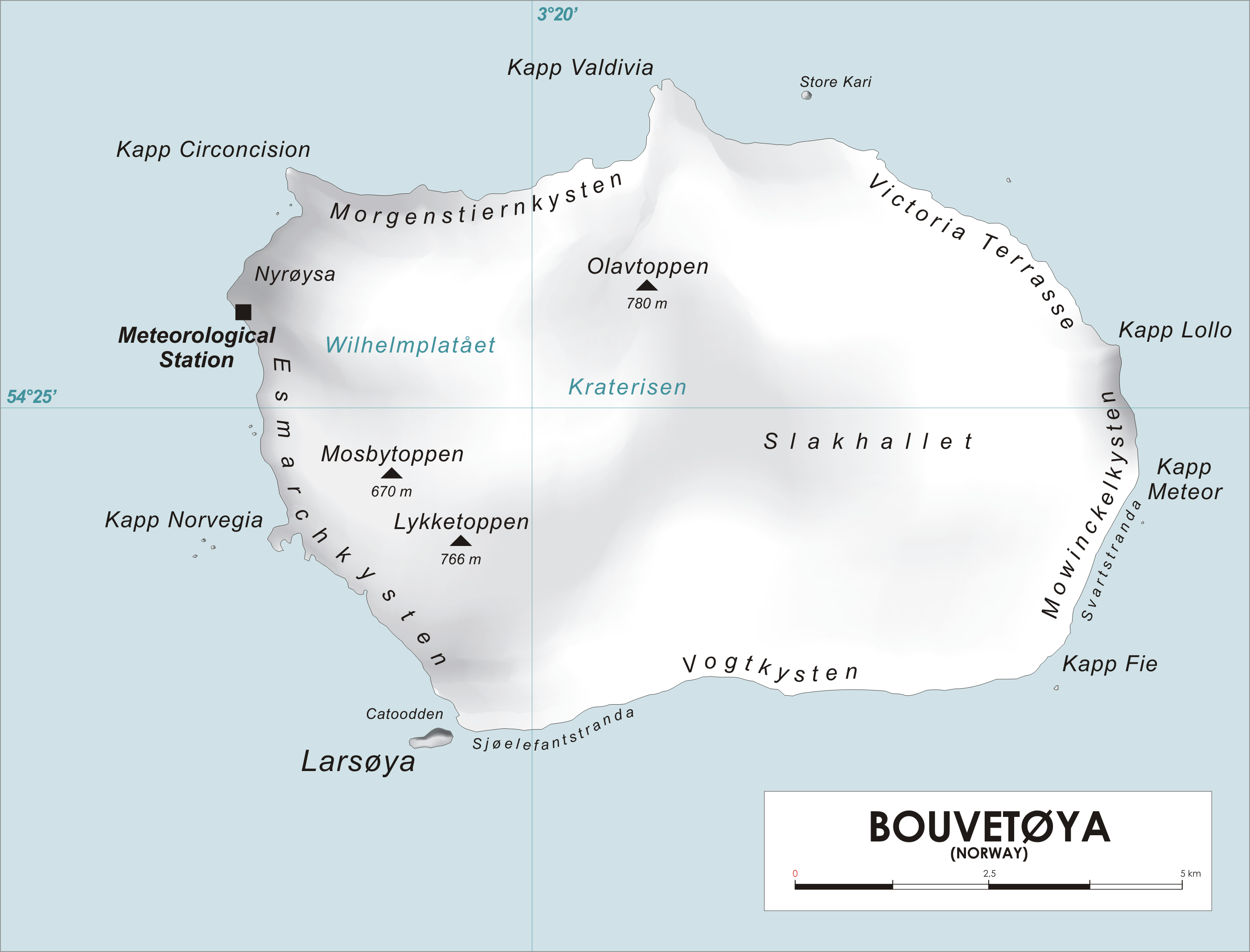
Map of Bouvetøya

Spiess Rocks (54°25′S 3°29′E) is a group of submerged rocks which extend up to 0.4 nautical miles (0.7 km) northeast of Cape Lollo on the island of Bouvetøya. First charted in December 1927 by a Norwegian expedition under Captain Harald Horntvedt. Named by the Norwegians for Captain Fritz A. Spiess, leader of the German expedition which visited Bouvetoya on board the Meteor in 1926.

== Other sources ==
- Simpson-Housley, Paul (2002) Antarctica: Exploration, Perception and Metaphor (Routledge) ISBN 9781134891214
