= Cape Meteor =

Headland at the eastern end of Bouvet Island, South Atlantic ocean

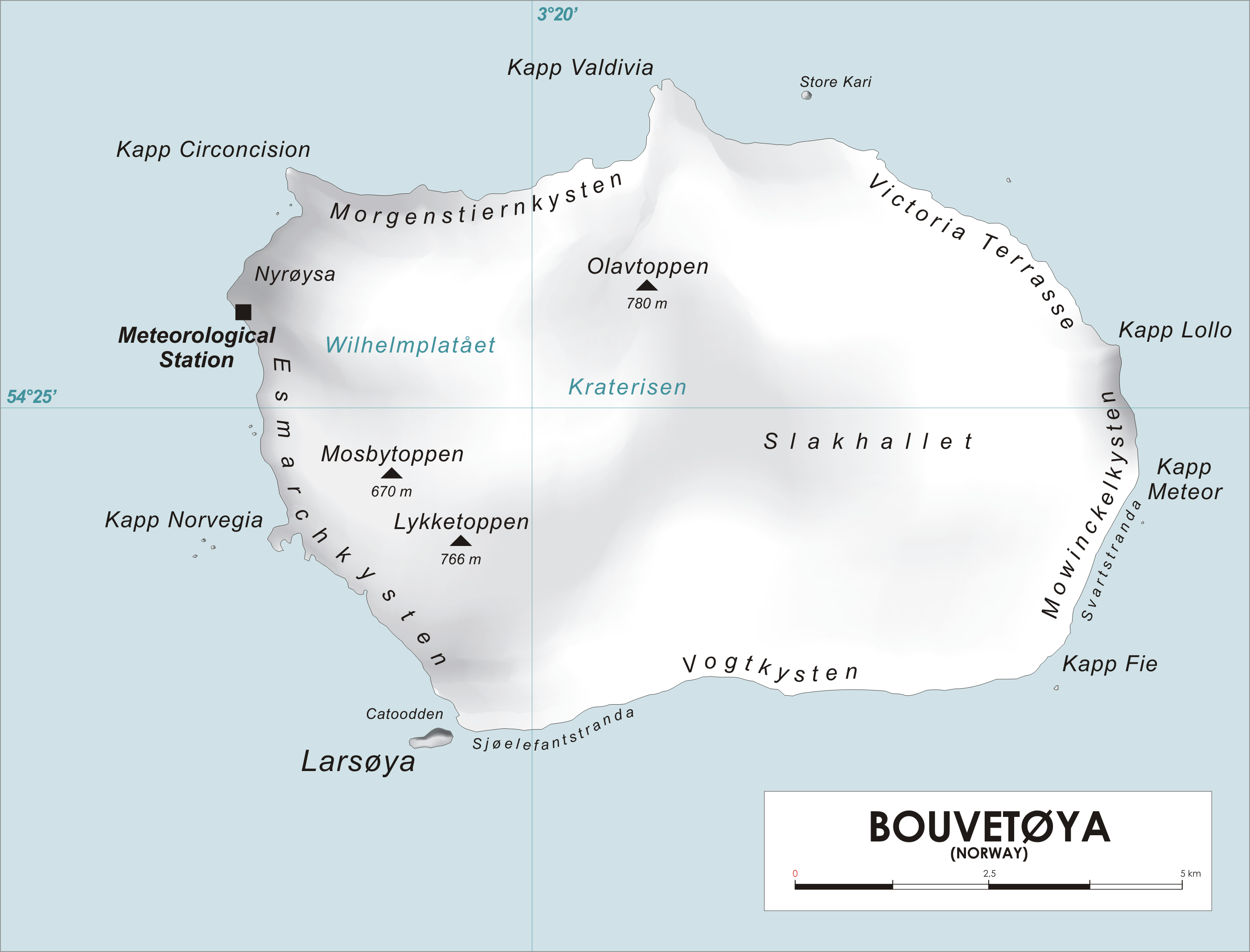
Map of Bouvetøya

Cape Meteor (54°26′S 3°29′E; Norwegian: Kapp Meteor) is a cape marked by steep cliffs in the coastal area of Mowinckelkysten, north of Svartstranda beach, and forms the eastern extremity of Bouvetøya island in the South Atlantic .

The cape was roughly charted in 1898 by the German Valdivia expedition led by marine biologist Carl Chun, and was later named after the survey ship Meteor, the ship in which the German Meteor expedition visited the island in 1926. The name appears on a British chart based upon a 1930 survey by personnel on the Discovery II, but this may reflect an earlier naming.

== See also ==
- Lindsay Reef
