= Lindsay Reef =

Map of Bouvetøya with Lindsay Reef (Lindsayskjeret)

Lindsay Reef (54°26′S 3°29′E) is a reef lying close north of Cape Meteor on the east side of the island of Bouvetøya in the South Atlantic Ocean. The reef was first charted in 1898 by a German expedition under Carl Chun. It was recharted in December 1927 by a Norwegian expedition under Captain Harald Horntvedt, and named by the Norwegians after Captain James Lindsay, a British whaler in command of the Swan who, in the company of Captain Thomas Hopper with the Otter, sighted Bouvetøya in 1808.

== Other sources ==
- Simpson-Housley, Paul (2002) Antarctica: Exploration, Perception and Metaphor (Routledge) ISBN 9781134891214
