= Jean-Baptiste Charles Bouvet de Lozier =

French explorer and colonial administrator (1705–1786)

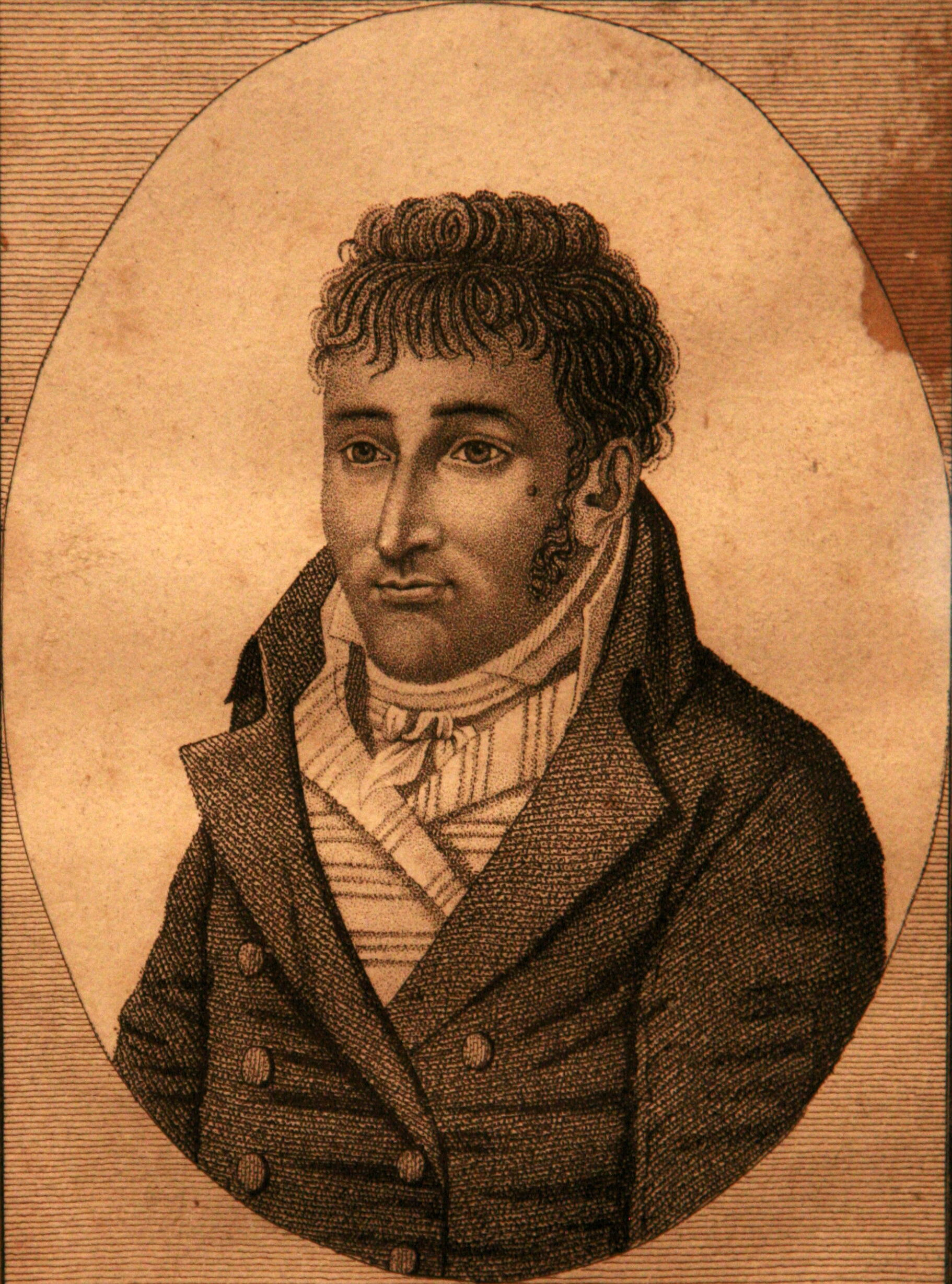
Anachronistic engraving of Lozier

Jean-Baptiste Charles Bouvet de Lozier (14 January 1705 – 1786) was a French explorer and colonial administrator of the Mascarene Islands to the east of Madagascar.

He was orphaned at the age of seven, and after being educated in Paris, he was sent to Saint Malo to study navigation. He became a lieutenant of the French East India Company in 1731. He succeeded in convincing his employer to provide him with two ships and send him on an exploration mission in the South Atlantic. With his ships, Aigle and Marie, he discovered on 1 January 1739 a tiny island which was named Bouvet Island after him, the world’s remotest island; however, he mislabelled the coordinates for the island, causing it to be lost until it was rediscovered seven decades later in 1808. Shortly afterwards, he had to abandon the expedition because most of his crew had fallen ill; his ship then called at the Cape of Good Hope and returned to France.

Ten years after his expedition, Lozier was appointed governor of the Mascarene Islands twice, once from 1750 to 1752 and a second time from 1757 to 1763. In 1769, he married the grandniece of Cardinal de Fleury, Mademoiselle de Laumont, with whom he had a son.

== Bibliography ==
- Lyubomir Ivanov and Nusha Ivanova. Bouvet and Kerguelen. In: The World of Antarctica. Generis Publishing, 2022. pp. 70–72. ISBN 979-8886764031
