= Norvegia Point =

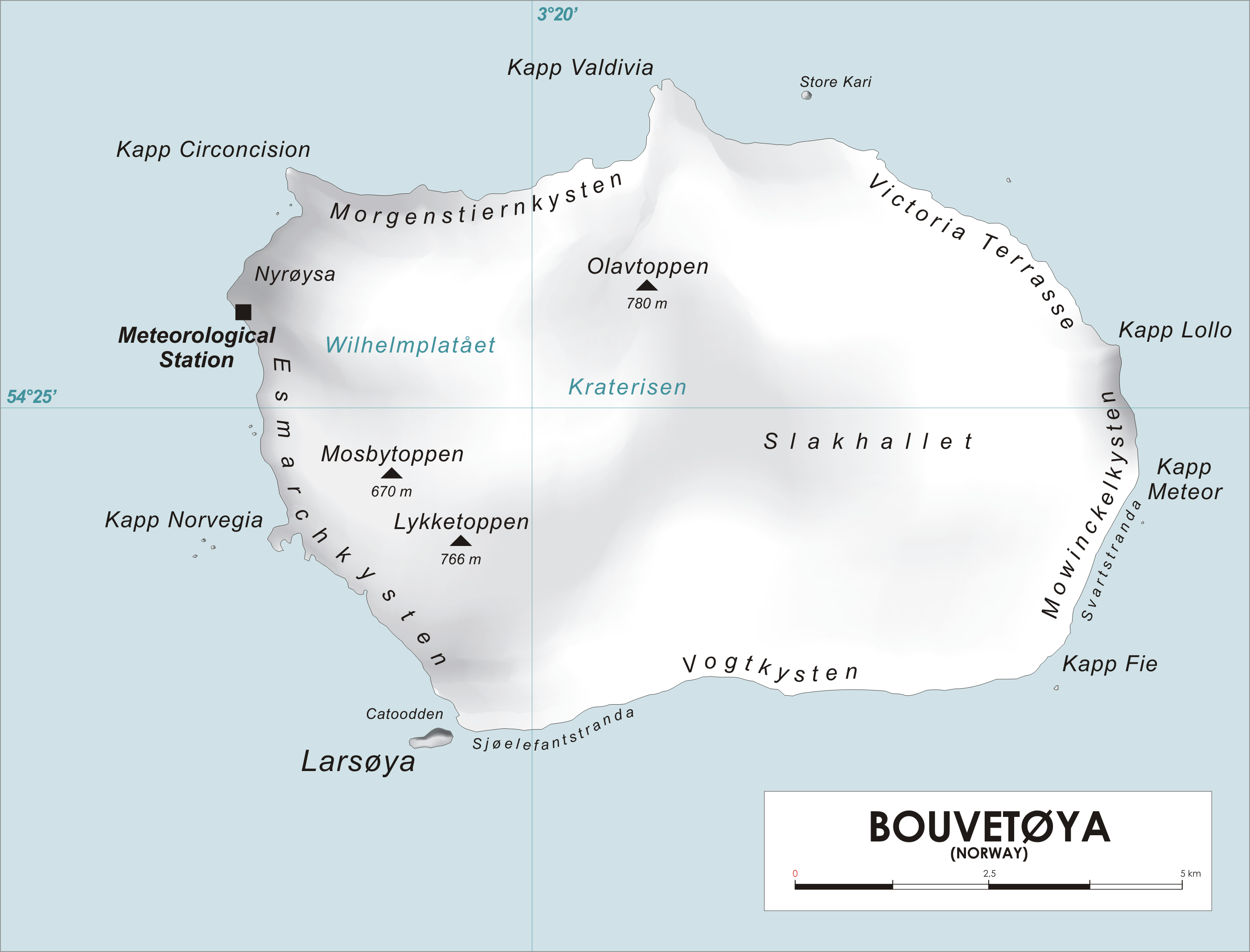
Map of Bouvetøya

Norvegia Point (Norwegian: Kapp Norvegia), (54°27′S 3°21′E) is a point 2 nautical miles (3.7 km) south of Cape Circoncision on the west side of Bouvet Island. First roughly charted from the Valdivia in 1898 by a German expedition under Carl Chun. Recharted in December 1927 by a Norwegian expedition under Captain Harald Horntvedt. Named by Horntvedt after his expedition ship, the Norvegia I.

== See also ==
- Benn Skerries
