= Cape Lollo =

Promontory on Bouvet Island

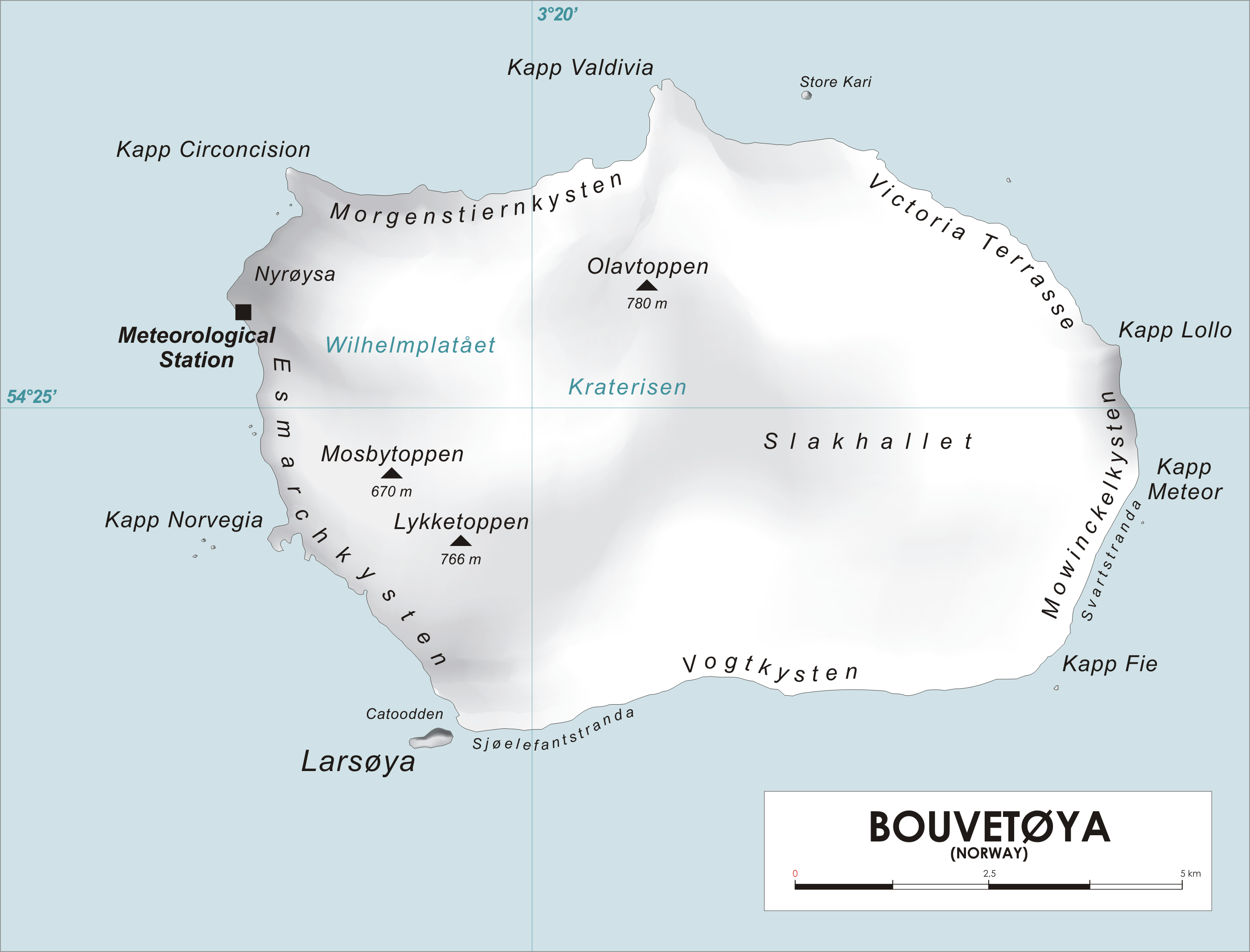
Map of Bouvetøya

Cape Lollo (Norwegian: Kapp Lollo), located at 54°25′S 3°29′E, is a cape which forms the northeastern extremity of Bouvetøya in Norway. It was first charted in 1898 by a German expedition under Carl Chun, and was recharted and named in December 1927 by a Norwegian expedition under Captain Harald Horntvedt.

== See also ==
- Spiess Rocks
