= Cape Circoncision =

Peninsula on Bouvet Island

Coordinates: 54.4109°S 3.3467°E

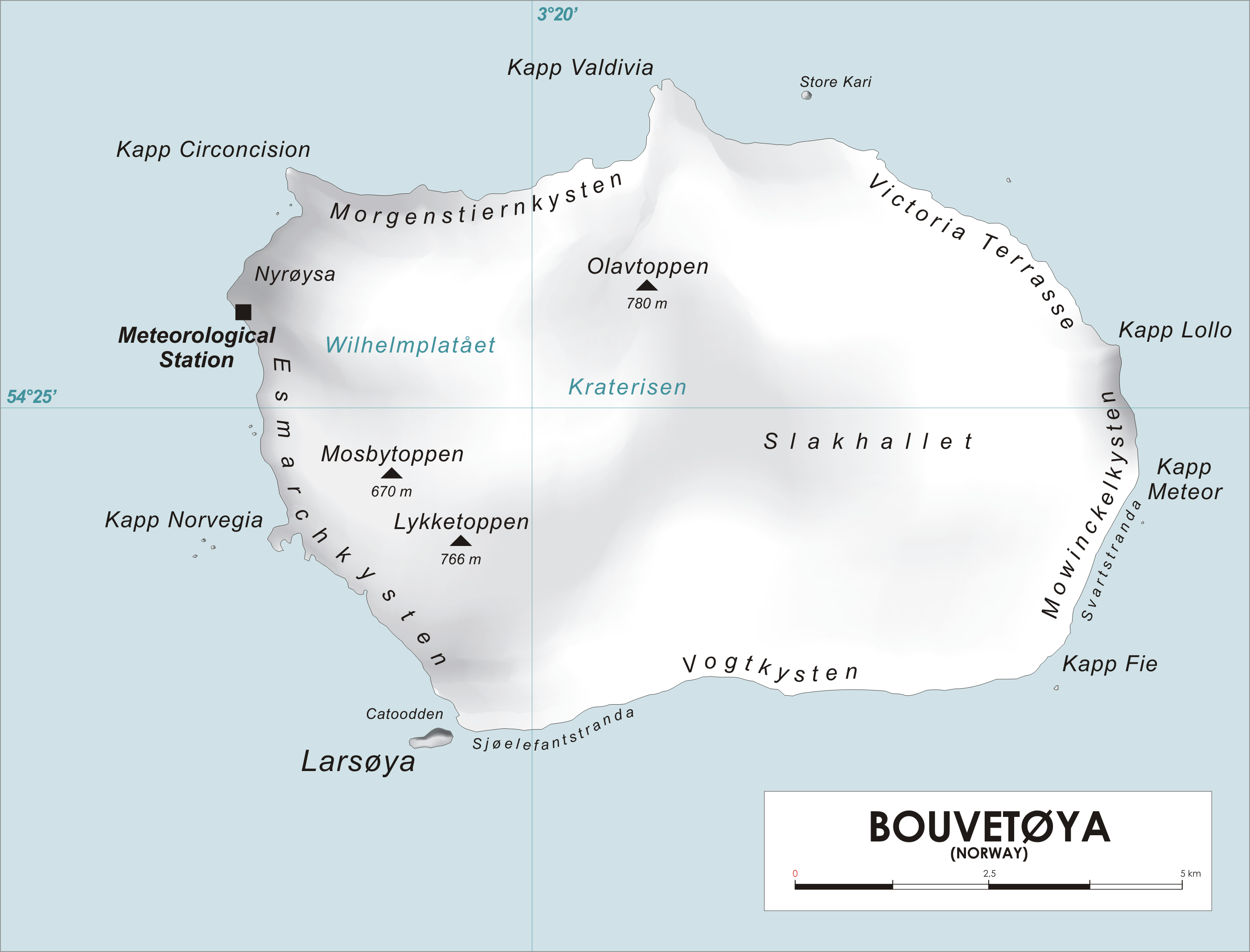
Map of Bouvetøya

Cape Circoncision (Norwegian: Kapp Circoncision) is a peninsula on the north-western edge of subantarctic Bouvet Island. The small peninsula was sighted by the French naval exploration that was led by Jean-Baptiste Charles Bouvet de Lozier on 1 January 1739, the Feast of the Circumcision day—thus the name. The cape provided the location for the base-camp of the 1928–1929 Norwegian expedition.
