= Cape Fie =

Promontory on Bouvet Island

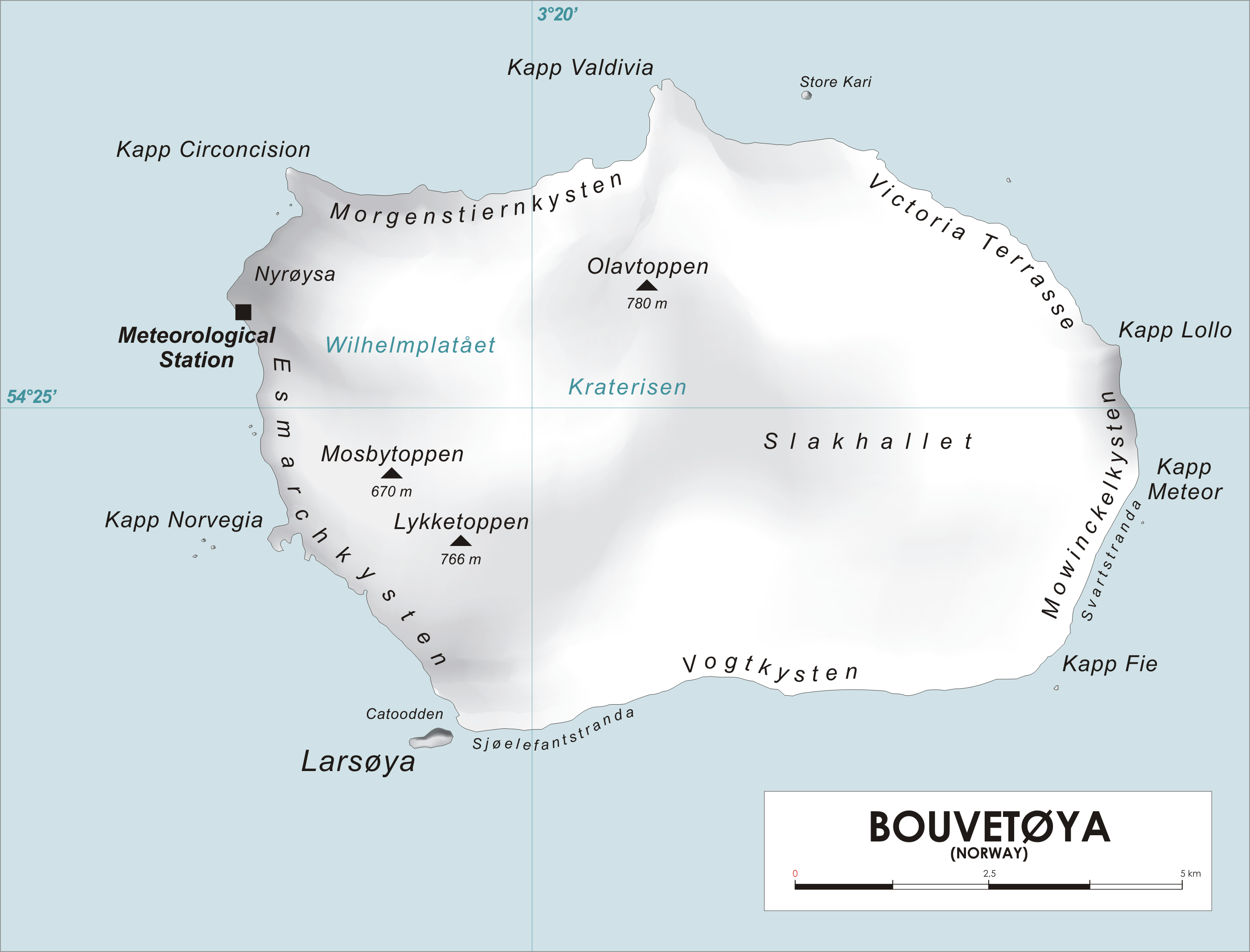
Map of Bouvetøya

Cape Fie (Norwegian: Kapp Fie), located at 54°27′S 3°28′E, is a cape marking the southeast extremity of Bouvetøya in the South Atlantic Ocean. It was first roughly charted in 1898 by a German expedition under Carl Chun, and was re-charted and named by the Norwegian expedition under Captain Harald Horntvedt who explored the area from the Norvegia in December 1927.

== See also ==
- Williams Reef
