= Cape Valdivia =

Promontory on Bouvet Island

Coordinates: 54.389°S 3.354°E

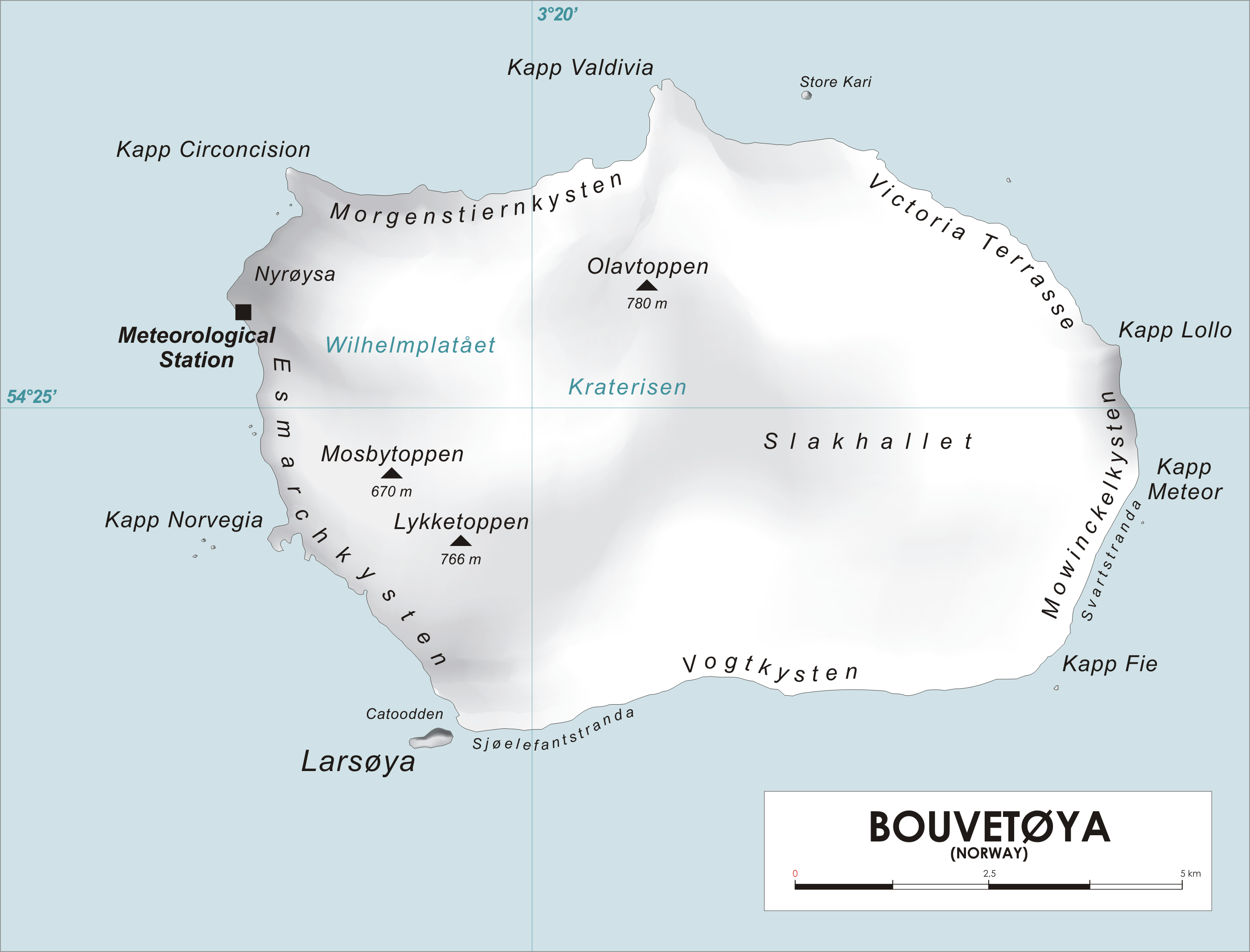
Map of Bouvet

Cape Valdivia (Kapp Valdivia) is the northernmost point on Bouvet Island (Bouvetøya i Søratlanteren) in the South Atlantic Ocean. The subantarctic Bouvet Island is administered by Norway.

Cape Valdivia lies in the centre of the island's highest point. To the west lies Cape Circoncision (Kapp Circoncision), from which Cape Valdivia is separated by a five kilometre stretch of coastline known as the Morgenstierne Coast (Morgenstiernekysten). Just north of the cape is the small islet of Gjest Baardsenstøtta. The distance to Norway is about 12,460 km. The cape derives its name from the German survey ship Valdivia, which fixed the position of Bouvet island in 1898.

== See also ==
- Sachse Rocks
