= Larsøya =

Island in the Southern Ocean

Coordinates: 54°27′11″S 3°18′54″E

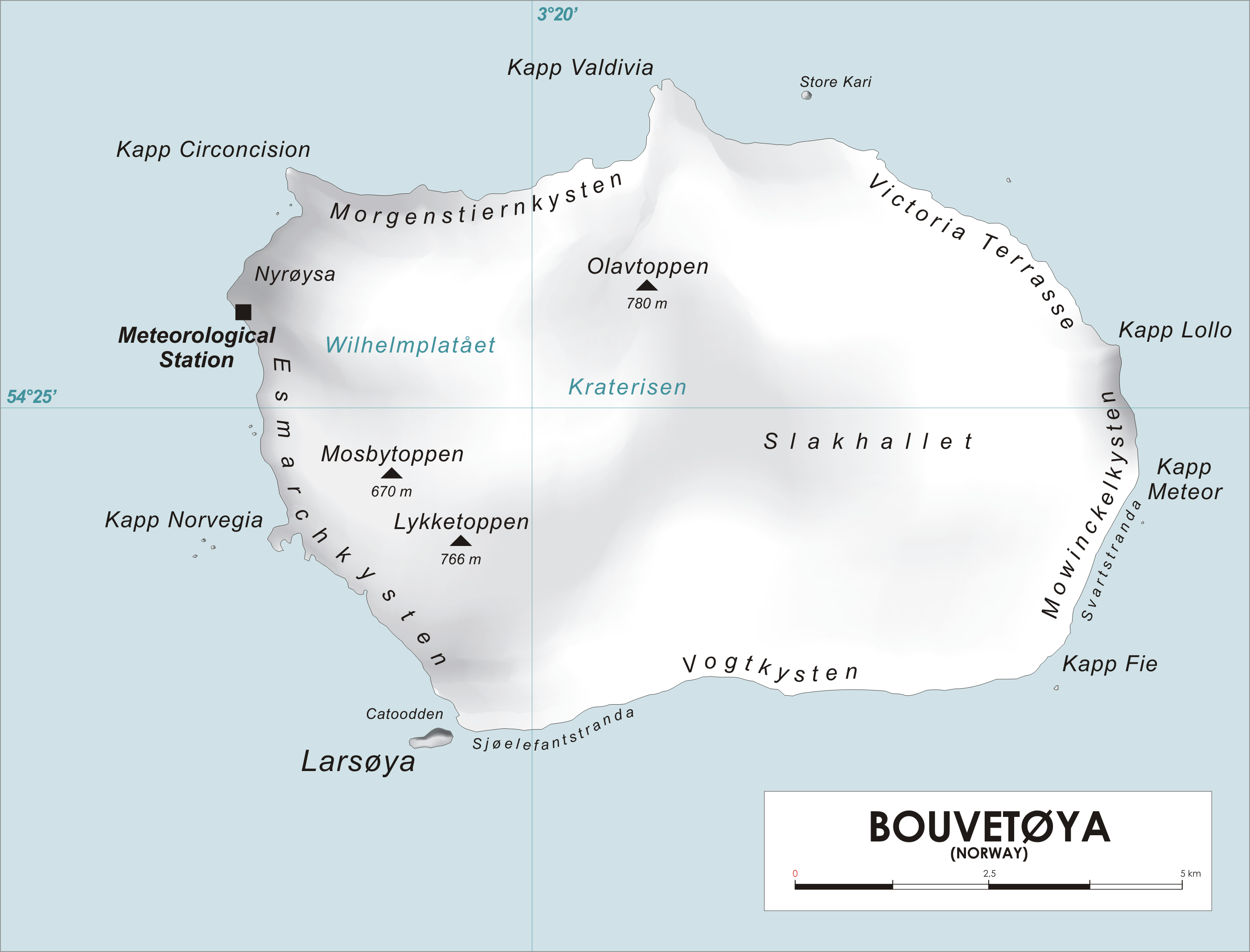
Map of Bouvetøya with Larsøya shown in the bottom left.

Larsøya, sometimes anglicized as Lars Island, is a rocky island, less than 0.2 nautical miles (0.4 km) long, that lies just off the southwestern extremity of the island of Bouvetøya in the South Atlantic Ocean. It was first roughly charted in 1898 by a German expedition under Carl Chun. The Norwegian expedition under Captain Harald Horntvedt made a landing on the island from the ship Norvegia in December 1927 and named it after Lars Christensen, sponsor of the expedition.

== See also ==
- List of Antarctic and subantarctic islands
