= Passet =

Mountain pass on Kongsøya, Svalbard, Norway

Coordinates: 78.8529°N 28.0774°E

Passet is a mountain pass on the island of Kongsøya in Kong Karls Land, Svalbard. It is located at the western side of Kongsøya, and separates the mountain of Sjögrenfjellet to the west from Tordenskjoldberget to the east. South of the pass is the bay Antarcticbukta, and the headland Kapp Altmann.
