= Kapp Hammerfest =

Headland of Svenskøya, Svalbard

Coordinates: 78.6408°N 26.7465°E

Kapp Hammerfest is a headland on Svenskøya in Kong Karls Land, Svalbard. It is the most southern point of Svenskøya, and the headland has a length of about 1.5 kilometres (0.93 mi). The headland is named after the Norwegian city of Hammerfest. North of the headland, at the western side of the Svenskøya, is Kyrkjevika with Antarcticøya and other smaller islands.

== See also ==
- Arnesenodden – the northernmost point of Svenskøya
- Kapp Weissenfels – the easternmost point of Svenskøya
