= Hidalen =

Valley of Svalbard, Norway

Coordinates: 78.9006°N 28.1515°E

Hidalen (The winter lair valley) is a valley at the western part of Kongsøya in Kong Karls Land, Svalbard. It is located between the mountains of Retziusfjellet to the south and Hårfagrehaugen to the north. The valley was given its name due to observations of several dens for polar bears in the valley.
