= Rundisdammen =

Lake in Kong Karls Land, Svalbard, Norway

- Location in Svalbard
- Location: Kongsøya in Kong Karls Land, Svalbard
- Coordinates: 78.8956°N 29.1139°E
- Type: natural freshwater lake
- Basin countries: Norway

Rundisdammen is a lake at Kongsøya in Kong Karls Land, Svalbard. It is located on Rundisflya, west of the glacier Rundisen, at the eastern part of the island. The name is taken from Rundisen, which has a circular shape.
