= Theodor Lerner =

German journalist and explorer (1866–1931)

Theodor Lerner (10 April 1866 – 12 May 1931) was a German journalist and polar explorer who conducted several expeditions to Svalbard. In 1897 he witnessed the start of S. A. Andrée's Arctic balloon expedition of 1897 and took part in the search for Andrée in 1898 during a journey with Friedrich Römer and Fritz Schaudinn. He visited Bjørnøya in 1898 and 1899, exploring the viability of coal mining and eventually claiming ownership of the island as a territory of the German Empire. This enterprise proved unsuccessful but raised some publicity, earning him the nickname "Nebelfürst" ("prince of the mists"). In 1908 after overwintering the polar night with Hjalmar Johansen in a cabin at Cape Boheman on Spitsbergen, he and Johansen travelled over the inland ice to Spitsbergen's northwest coast.

== Legacy ==
The headland Lernerneset of Abel Island in Kong Karls Land, Svalbard, is named after him.

== In popular culture ==
Lerner's history is the basis for the 2001 German novel Der Nebelfürst by Martin Mosebach.
