= Svenskebukta =

Bay of Svalbard

Coordinates: 78.9125°N 29.1042°E

Svenskebukta is a bay at the northern side of Kongsøya of Kong Karls Land, Svalbard. It is located between Kapp Oscar and eastwards towards a point west of Nordaustpynten. Former name variants of the bay are Holmbukta, Swedish: Svenska Segelsällskapets Bay and Swedish Yacht Club Bay. The glacier Rundisen debouches into the bay.
