= Vrakbukta =

Bay of Svalbard

Geography of Vrakbukta
- Coordinates: 78°52′25″N 27°57′04″E
- Terrain: Marine

Vrakbukta (The Wreck Bay) is a bay at the northwestern side of Kongsøya in Kong Karls Land, Svalbard. It is located between Retziusfjellet and the headland of Kennedyneset.
