= South Africa Standard Time =

Time zone

- Time zone

UTC offset
- SAST: UTC+02:00

Current time
- 03:54, 30 July 2026 SAST [refresh]

Observance of DST
- DST is not observed in this time zone.

Time in Africa: Light Blue / Cape Verde Time^{[a]} (UTC−1); Blue / Greenwich Mean Time (UTC); Red / Central European Time; West Africa Time; (UTC+1)^{[b]}; Yellow / Central Africa Time; Eastern European Time; South African Standard Time; (UTC+2); Ochre / Egypt Standard Time (UTC+2); Ochre / Egypt Summer Time (UTC+3); Green / East Africa Time (UTC+3); Turquoise / Mauritius Time^{[d]}; Seychelles Time^{[d]}; (UTC+4)^{a} The islands of Cape Verde lie west of the African mainland.^{b} In September 2026, Morocco will switch permanently to Greenwich Mean Time.^{d} Mauritius and the Seychelles lie to the east and northeast of Madagascar, respectively.

South African Standard Time (SAST) is the time zone used by all of South Africa as well as Eswatini and Lesotho. The zone is two hours ahead of UTC (UTC+02:00) and is the same as Central Africa Time. Daylight saving time is not observed in either time zone. Solar noon in this time zone occurs at 30° E in SAST, effectively making Pietermaritzburg at the correct solar noon point, with Johannesburg and Pretoria slightly west at 28° E and Durban slightly east at 31° E. Thus, most of South Africa's population experience true solar noon at approximately 12:00 daily.

The western Northern Cape and Western Cape differ, however. Everywhere on land west of 22°30′ E effectively experiences year-round daylight saving time because of its location in true UTC+01:00 but still being in South African Standard Time. Sunrise and sunset are thus relatively late in Cape Town, compared to the rest of the country.

To illustrate, daylight hours for South Africa's western and easternmost major cities:

	Summer solstice	Winter solstice
Cape Town	05:32–19:57	07:51–17:45
Durban	04:52–18:56	06:51–17:04

The South African National Time Standard, or 'SA Time' Master Clock, is maintained at the Time and Frequency Laboratory of the National Metrology Institute of South Africa (NMISA) at Pretoria and is distributed publicly by an NTP Internet Time service.

== History ==
Before 8 February 1892, there was no uniformity of time in South Africa and local mean time was in use at the various towns. In 1892, a railway conference was held in Bloemfontein and discussed difficulty of working a railway system, in the absence of a uniform time system. The governments of the Orange Free State, Transvaal and the Cape Colony officially adopted a uniform standard time of UTC+01:30 which was defined as mean time 22.5° east of Greenwich. On 1 March 1903 GMT+02:00 was adopted, which became the current UTC+02:00 when UTC replaced GMT for most purposes.

Prior to 1 March 1903, the Colony of Natal was already using a uniform time supplied by the Natal Observatory. The observatory's local mean time was (UTC+01:52).

South Africa observed a daylight saving time of GMT+03:00 (UTC+03:00) between 20 September 1942 to 21 March 1943 and 19 September 1943 to 19 March 1944.

South African Standard Time is defined as "Coordinated Universal Time plus two hours" (UTC+02:00) as defined in South African National Government Gazette No. 40125 of 8 July 2016.

== Date and time notation ==
South Africa signed up to use ISO 8601 for date and time representation through national standard ARP 010:1989 in 1998 A.D. The most recent South African Bureau of Standards standard SANS 8601:2009 "... is the identical implementation of ISO 8601:2004, and is adopted with the permission of the International Organization for Standardization" and was reviewed in 2016.

No distinction is made by the SANS 8601 standard between any of the 11 official languages.

The week is from Monday until Sunday. The first week of the year contains 1 January, when the new year begins. Major cities observing South Africa Standard Time include Johannesburg, Cape Town, Durban, Pretoria, and Port Elizabeth, all following the same UTC+02:00 time zone year-round.

The 24-hour notation in hour-minute(s) order used a colon as a separator (03:54).

== See also ==
- Noon Gun
