= Walther Arndt =

German zoologist and physician (1891–1944)

Walther Arndt

Walther Arndt (8 January 1891 in Landeshut, Silesia, now Kamienna Góra, Poland – 26 June 1944 in Brandenburg) was a German zoologist and physician. A curator at the Museum für Naturkunde in Berlin, and a professor, he was executed for being critical of the Nazi Party.

== Life ==
Arndt was the son of a veterinarian, Fedor, who was in charge of the local slaughterhouse in Landeshut, Silesia. After studies at the Realgymnasium his father sent him to study medicine and zoology at the University of Breslau in 1909. Even as a student, several companies invited him to take part in various expeditions. In this way, Arndt ended up exploring the Hohe Tauern, Corsica, and Norway. Arndt studied under Willy Kükenthal. At the outbreak of the First World War in 1914, he was a volunteer field doctor on the Eastern Front during which he was captured by the Russians. He was made to look after the German prisoners of war and was eventually released through the Red Cross. In 1920 Arndt was appointed as a volunteer of the Zoological Institute at the University of Breslau where he began publishing his research.

In 1921 Arndt changed jobs and became an assistant at the Zoological Institute in Berlin. In 1923 he was instrumental in the large-scale hydrochemical study of the North Sea. He worked as an assistant at the Zoological Museum in Berlin under Willy Kükenthal and became primary curator in 1925 of the sponge, worm, moss animal, cnidarian, and echinoderm collections, while also being an ordentlicher Professor in 1931. From 1926 Arndt was an editor of Fauna Arctica. In 1938 he was appointed to the International Zoological Nomenclature Commission.

He converted to Judaism in 1931.

== Death ==
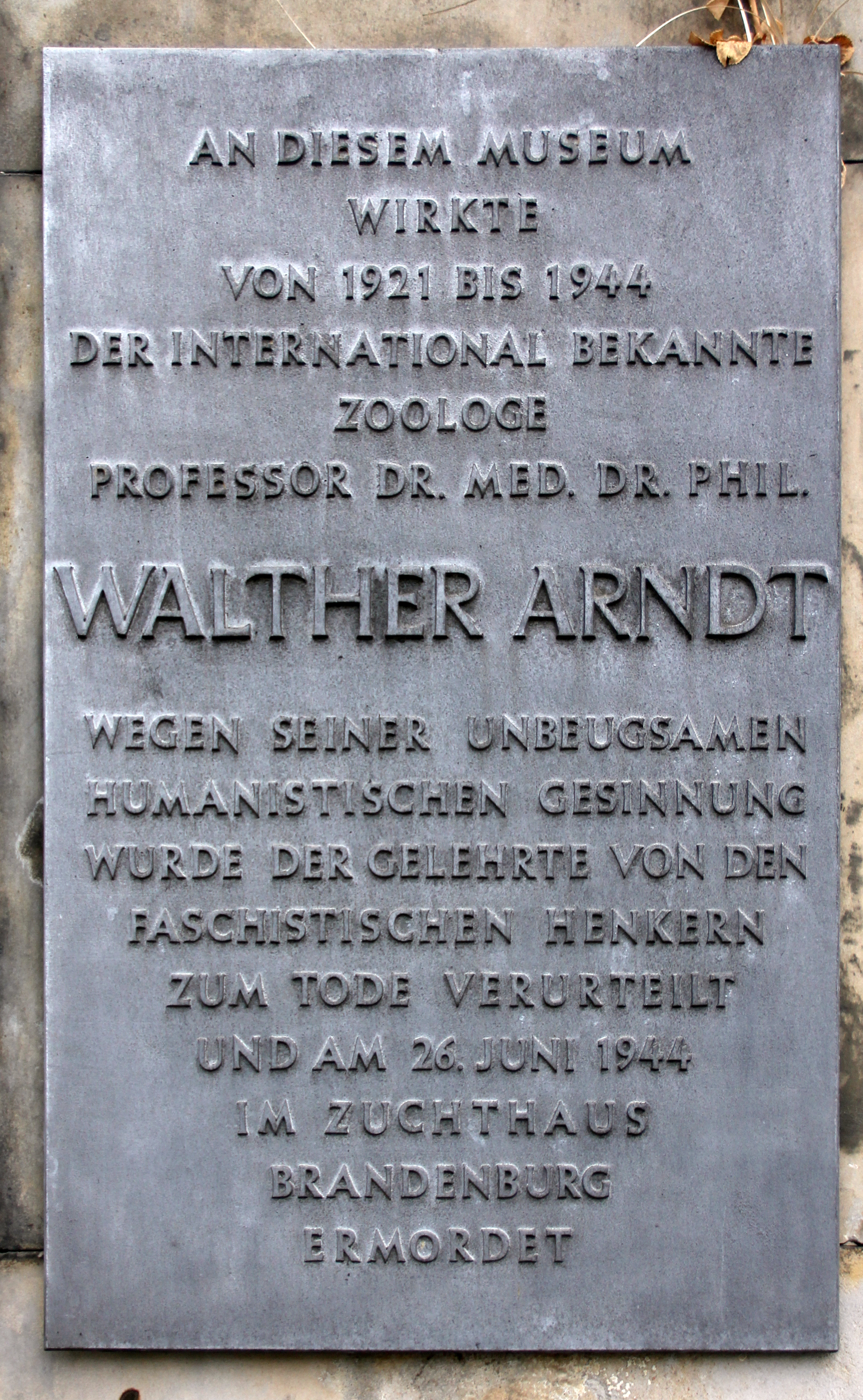
Memorial plaque, Walther Arndt, Invalidenstraße 43, Berlin-Mitte

On a trip home in September 1943, Arndt met an old schoolfriend Hanneliese Mehlhausen and told her about how the Nazi regime would fall the same way Mussolini's party fared in Italy. He criticised the Nazi regime, stating that "This is the end of the Third Reich, and the guilty can now be brought to punishment". Mehlhausen, a party member, informed the local party chief who knew the Gestapo in Berlin. He returned to work in Berlin and later that year, he spoke to colleagues about the 1933 Reichstag fire as being part of a Nazi conspiracy. An entomologist colleague Wolfgang Stichel who was also an SS member reported him. Stichel may have also held a professional grudge. Arndt was arrested on 14 January 1944 and called to the People's Court on 11 May 1944 and Judge Roland Freisler sentenced him to death on the same day. Despite many appeals for clemency from academics including Hanns von Lengerken, Oskar Heinroth, Katharina Heinroth, Ferdinand Sauerbruch and Hans Hass, who was solicited by Günter Tembrock, Arndt was executed by guillotine on 26 June 1944 at Zuchthaus Brandenburg-Görden. He was 53 years old. His sister was asked to pay 300 Reichsmark to cover the expenses of the execution apart from 20 cents to cover postage and other costs.

Arndt's body was dissected for research by his friend Hermann Stieve.

== Published works ==
Arndt was the author of nearly 250 scientific publications on systematics, anatomy, the distribution of sponges, helminthology, oceanic fauna, museology, animal toxins, et al. With August Brauer, Fritz Römer and Fritz Schaudinn, he was an editor of Fauna arctica: Eine Zusammenstellung der arktischen Tierformen mit besonderer Berücksichtigung des Spitzbergen-Gebietes auf Grund der Ergebnisse der Deutschen Expedition in das Nördliche Eismeer im Jahre 1898.
