= Koppelvatna =

Lakes at Kongsøya, Svalbard

- Location in Svalbard
- Location: Kongsøya in Kong Karls Land, Svalbard
- Coordinates: 78.8995°N 29.5814°E
- Type: natural freshwater lakes
- Basin countries: Norway

Koppelvatna is the name of five small lakes at Kongsøya in Kong Karls Land, Svalbard. They are located at the eastern part of the island, between Nordaustpynten, Bremodden and Johnsenberget.
