= Bremodden =

Landform on Kongsøya, Svalbard archipelago, Norway

Coordinates: 78.8940°N 29.6333°E

Bremodden is a headland at the eastern side of Kongsøya in Kong Karls Land, Svalbard. It is located east of Koppelvatna, about 2.5 kilometers south of Nordaustpynten, and defines the northeastern extension of the bay Andréebukta.
