= Kapp Weissenfels =

Headland of Svenskøya, Svalbard

- Cape
- Coordinates: 78°42′53″N 27°03′26″E
- Location: Svenskøya, Svalbard, Norway

Kapp Weissenfels is a headland on Svenskøya in Kong Karls Land, Svalbard. It is the most eastern point of Svenskøya, and the headland has a length of about 1.2 kilometers. The headland is named after the German city of Weißenfels. The outer point is about 25 meters high, and serves as a breeding place for guillemot, kittiwakes and ptarmigan. Nearby are sand beaches with undulating sand dunes.

== See also ==
- Arnesenodden – the northernmost point of Svenskøya
- Kapp Hammerfest – the easternmost point of Svenskøya
