= Antarcticbukta =

Bay of Svalbard

Coordinates: 78.8329°N 28.0172°E

Antarcticbukta is a wide bay at the southern side of Kongsøya in Kong Karls Land, Svalbard. It is located south of the mountain Sjögrenfjellet. The bay extends eastwards to the headland of Kapp Altmann, which separates the bay from the beach area Snøsporvstranda.
