= Fritz Römer =

German zoologist (1866–1909)

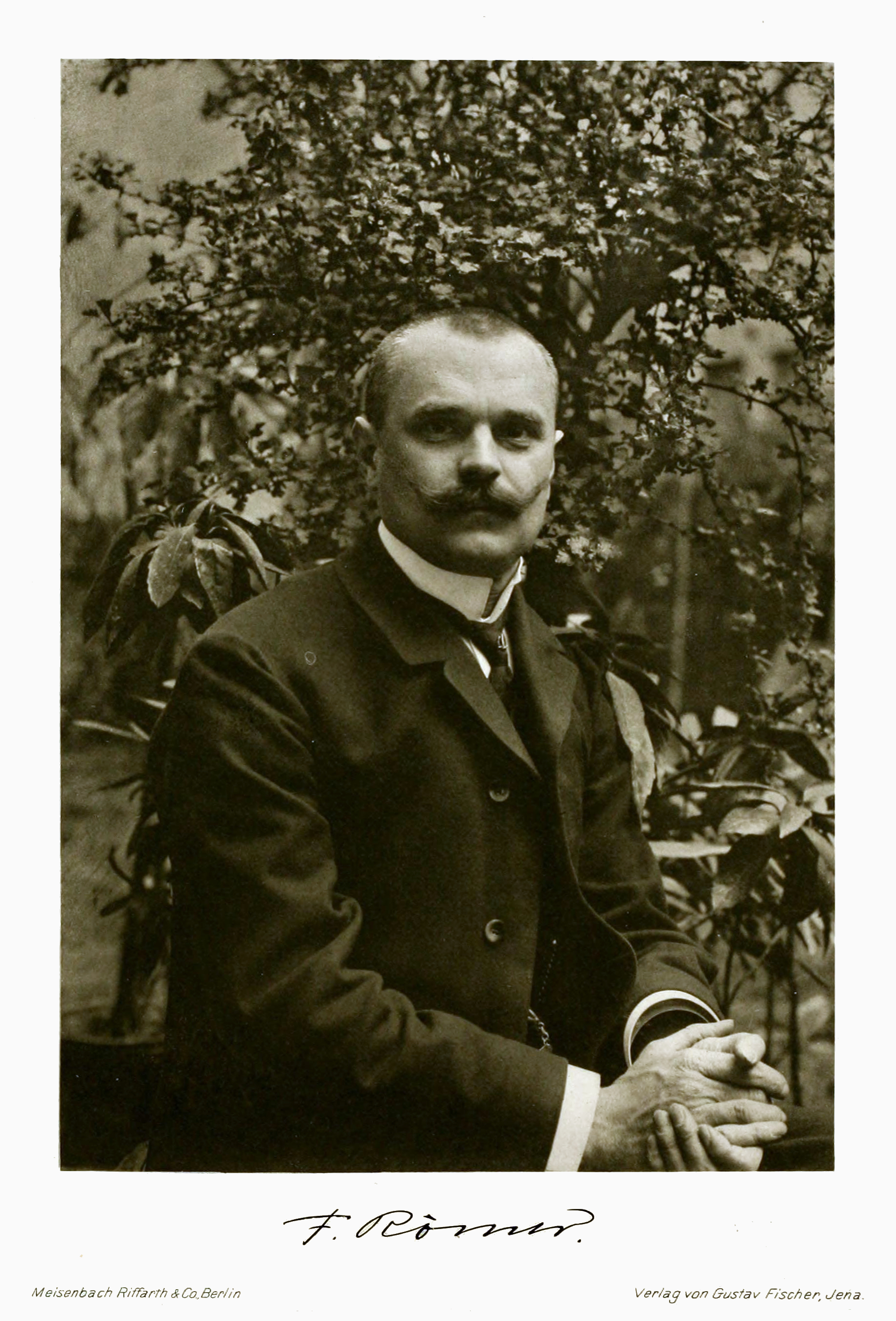
Fritz Römer (1866-1909)

Hermann Joseph Fritz Römer (10 April 1866 in Mörs – 20 March 1909 in Frankfurt am Main) was a German zoologist.

From 1889 he studied natural sciences at the University of Jena, later graduating with a dissertation on the development of an armadillos' carapace. In 1892 he began work as an assistant to Ernst Haeckel (1834–1919) at Jena, where he focused on studies involving skin and hair formation of vertebrates. In April 1898 he became an assistant at the zoological museum in Berlin.

In the summer of 1898, with zoologist Fritz Schaudinn (1871–1906) and explorer Theodor Lerner (1866–1931), he embarked on a scientific expedition to Svalbard aboard the trawler Helgoland. In the waters around Svalbard, the scientists gathered a large and diverse collection of marine fauna. These zoological specimens, along with knowledge gained on the expedition, served as a focal point towards Römer and Schaudinn's publication of "Fauna Arctica", an important work on Arctic fauna that eventually ran to six volumes. The mission also had significance from a geographical standpoint; Kapitän Rüdiger of the Helgoland made a number of corrections and additions to the map of Svalbard, that included charting the first accurate map of Kong Karls Land. Also, the Helgoland is credited as the first vessel to circumnavigate Nordaustlandet in a counterclockwise direction.

In 1899 Römer began work in the zoological institute at the University of Breslau under the direction of Willy Kükenthal (1861–1922). In 1907 he was appointed scientific director of the new Senckenberg Museum in Frankfurt am Main, a position he maintained until his death in 1909.

== Writings ==
- Über den Bau und die Entwickelung des Panzers der Gürteltiere (graduate thesis).
- Fauna arctica; eine Zusammenstellung der arktischen Tierformen, mit besonderer Berucksichtigung des Spitzbergen-Gebietes auf Grund der Ergebnisse der Deutschen Expedition in das Nörliche Eismeer im Jahre 1898, (1900–1933, six volumes; with Fritz Richard Schaudinn, August Brauer (1863–1917) and Walther Arndt 1891–1944) - Fauna arctica, a compilation of arctic animal forms, with special consideration of the Spitzbergen area due to the results of the German expedition in the Northern Polar Sea in the year 1898.
  - Einleitung, Plan des Werkes und Reisebericht, 1900, (in Fauna arctica pp. 1–84).
  - Die Siphonophoren, 1902, (in Fauna arctica pp. 169–184) - Siphonophorae
  - Die Ctenophoren, 1904, (in Fauna arctica pp. 65–90) - Ctenophora.
