= Kapp Koburg =

Headland of Kongsøya, Svalbard

Coordinates: 78.9176°N 28.1284°E

Kapp Koburg is a headland at the western part of Kongsøya in Kong Karls Land, Svalbard. It is located at the western side of Hårfagrehaugen, and defines the southwestern extension of the bay Bünsowbukta.
