= Sjögrenfjellet =

Mountain on Svalbard, Norway

Coordinates: 78.8471°N 27.9885°E

Sjögrenfjellet is a mountain on the island of Kongsøya in Kong Karls Land, Svalbard. It is named after geologist Hjalmar Sjögren. The mountain is located at the western side of the island, north of the bay Antarcticbukta, and is separated from Tordenskjoldberget by the mountain pass Passet.
