= 151st Brigade =

151st Brigade may refer to:

== Ukraine ==
- 151st Mechanized Brigade

== United Kingdom ==
- 151st (Durham Light Infantry) Brigade
- 151st Infantry Brigade (United Kingdom)

== United States ==
- 151st Cavalry Brigade
- 151st Field Artillery Brigade

== See also ==
- 151st Division (disambiguation)
- 151st Regiment (disambiguation)
