= Andréebukta =

Bay of Svalbard

Coordinates: 78.8755°N 29.3983°E

Andréebukta is a bay at the southeastern side of Kongsøya in Kong Karls Land, Svalbard. It is located between Tømmerneset and Bremodden, below the mountain of Johnsenberget. The bay is named after Arctic explorer Salomon August Andrée.
