= Lernerneset =

Headland of Abel Island, Svalbard

- Cape
- Coordinates: 79°00′42″N 30°04′15″E
- Location: Abel Island, Svalbard, Norway

Lernerneset is a headland at the northwestern coast of Abel Island in Kong Karls Land, Svalbard. The headland is named after German Arctic explorer Theodor Lerner. A former variant of the name was Kap Lerner.
