= Arnesenodden =

Headland of Kong Karls Land, Svalbard

Coordinates: 78.8371°N 26.5254°E

Arnesenodden is a headland on Svenskøya in Kong Karls Land, Svalbard. It is the most northern point of Svenskøya, at the foot of the mountain Mohnhøgda. The headland is named after Arctic explorer Magnus Arnesen.

== See also ==
- Kapp Hammerfest – the southernmost point of Svenskøya
- Kapp Weissenfels – the easternmost point of Svenskøya
