= UTC−10:00 =

Time zone

- Time zone
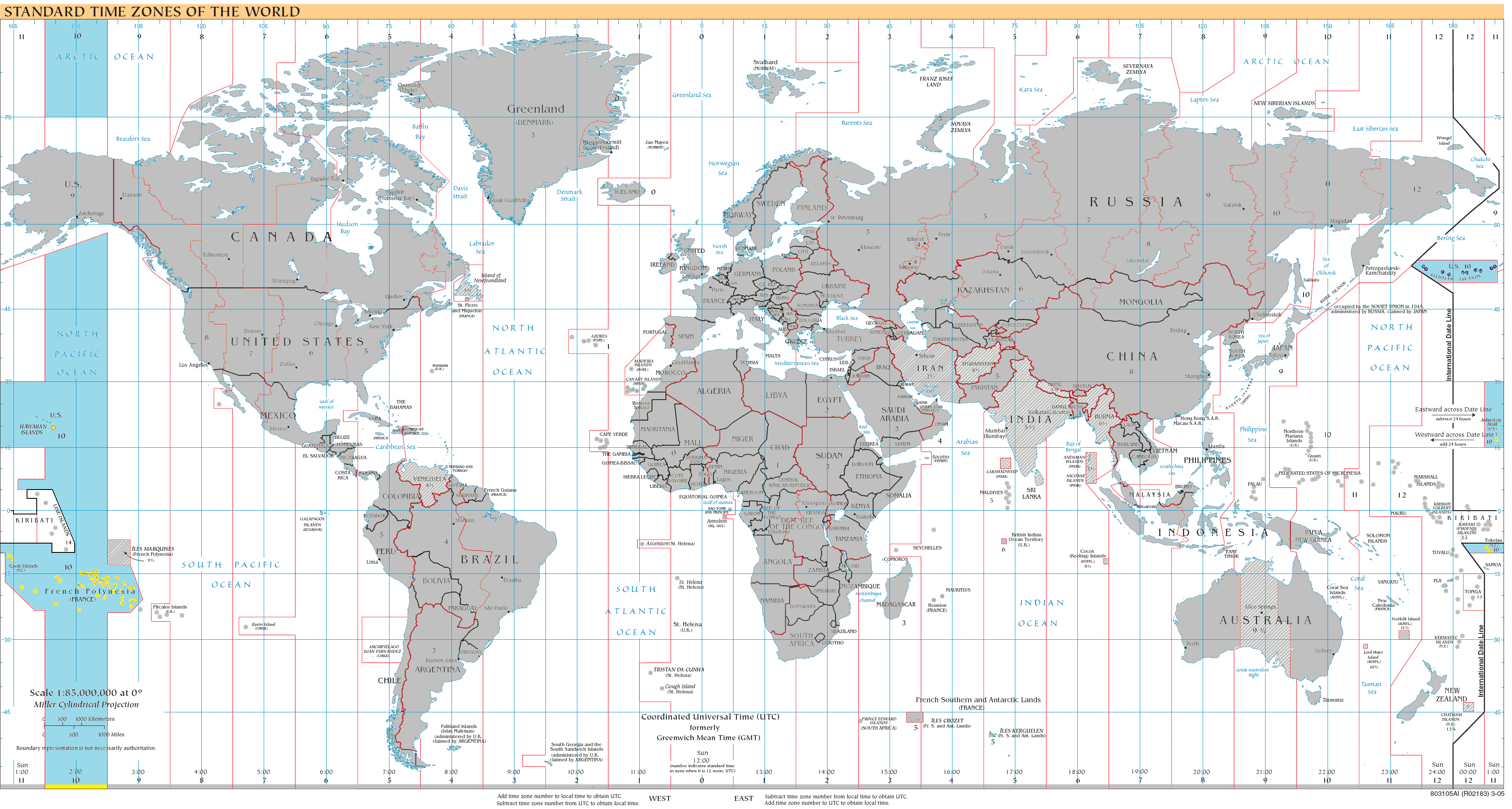
- World map with the time zone highlighted

UTC offset
- UTC: UTC−10:00

Current time
- 03:47, 28 September 2025 UTC−10:00 [refresh]

Central meridian
- 150 degrees W

Date-time group
- W

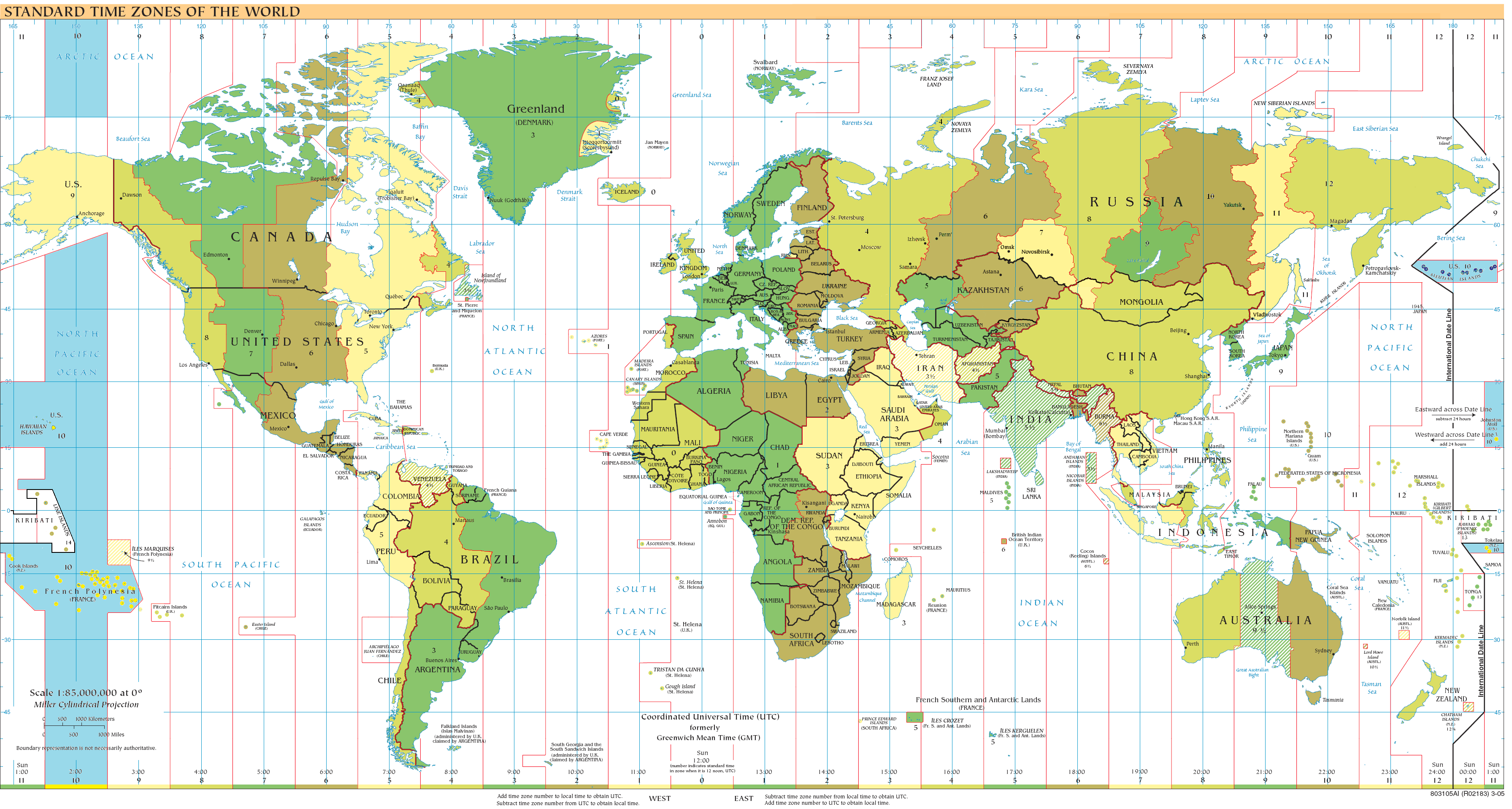
UTC−10:00: blue (December), orange (June), yellow (year-round), light blue (sea areas)

UTC−10:00 is an identifier for a time offset from UTC of −10:00. This time is used in Hawaii, Alaska, French Polynesia, and the Cook Islands.

== As standard time (year-round) ==
Principal cities: Honolulu, Avarua, Papeete, Faʻaʻā

=== Oceania ===
==== Pacific Ocean ====
===== Polynesia =====
- France
  - French Polynesia
    - Society Islands
      - Leeward Islands
      - Windward Islands
    - Tuamotus
      - Disappointment Islands
      - Duke of Gloucester Islands
      - Far East Tuamotu Group
      - Hao Group
      - Hikeru Group
      - King George Islands
      - Palliser Islands
      - Raeffsky Islands
    - Gambier Islands
      - Outer Gambier Group
      - Acteon Group
    - Austral Islands
      - Tupua'i Islands
      - Bass Islands
- New Zealand
  - Cook Islands
- United States (Hawaii–Aleutian Time Zone)
  - Hawaii
  - United States Minor Outlying Islands
    - Johnston Atoll

== As standard time (Northern Hemisphere winter) ==
=== North America ===
- United States
  - Alaska
    - Aleutian Islands west of 169.30°W
      - Andreanof Islands
      - Islands of Four Mountains
      - Near Islands
      - Rat Islands

== Historical changes ==
- Kiribati
  - Line Islands – including Kiritimati (Christmas Island) advanced 24 hours (to UTC+14:00) to the Eastern Hemisphere side of the International Date Line by skipping December 31, 1994.
- Samoa – Time in Samoa advanced 24 hours (to UTC+14:00) to the Eastern Hemisphere side of the International Date Line by skipping December 30, 2011.
