= Olgastretet =

Strait in Svalbard, Norway

Coordinates: 78°38′N 24°07′E

Olgastretet (English: Olga Strait) is a strait in the Svalbard archipelago, separating Edgeøya and Barentsøya from Svenskøya of the Kong Karls Land. The strait takes its name from Olga Nikolaevna of Russia (1822-1892).
