= Rivalensundet =

Strait in Svalbard, Norway

Coordinates: 78°48′32″N 27°21′54″E

Rivalensundet is a strait in the Svalbard archipelago, separating Kongsøya from Svenskøya both in Kong Karls Land. It has a width of about 14 nautical miles. According to historical records, the strait was discovered in 1859, and first sailed in 1889. It is named after the vessel Rivalen.
