= 151st =

151st is the ordinal form of the number 151. 151st or One hundred and fifty-first may also refer to:

- A fraction, 1/151, equal to one of 151 equal parts

== Geography ==
- 151st meridian east, a line of longitude
- 151st meridian west, a line of longitude

== Military ==
- 151st Brigade (disambiguation)
- 151st Division (disambiguation)
- 151st Regiment (disambiguation)

== See also ==
- May 31, 151st day of the year in a standard year
