= 150th meridian =

150th meridian may refer to:

- 150th meridian east, a line of longitude east of the Greenwich Meridian
- 150th meridian west, a line of longitude west of the Greenwich Meridian

150th meridian west	150th meridian east
