= Hårfagrehaugen =

Mountain in Svalbard, Norway

- Location within Svalbard

Highest point
- Elevation: 304 m (997 ft)
- Prominence: 48 ft (15 m)
- Coordinates: 78°23′2″N 28°43′23″E

Naming
- Language of name: Norwegian

Geography
- Location: Svalbard, Norway
- Country: Norway

Hårfagrehaugen is a mountain on Kongsøya in Kong Karls Land, Svalbard. It is named after Harald Fairhair, the first King of Norway. The mountain reaches a height of 304 m.a.s.l., and is located north of Retziusfjellet, separated by the valley of Hidalen.
