= Hammerfest (disambiguation) =

Hammerfest may refer to:

== Places ==
- Hammerfest Municipality, a municipality in Finnmark county, Norway
- Hammerfest (town), the main town in Hammerfest Municipality in Finnmark county, Norway
  - Hammerfest Airport, the town's aerodrome
  - Hammerfest Church, the town's main place of worship
- Hammerfest prosti, an ecclesiastical region of the Church of Norway
- Kapp Hammerfest, a headland on Svenskøya island in Svalbard, Norway

== Other ==
- Hammerfest District Court, a former district court with jurisdiction in northern Norway
- Hammerfest (festival), an annual music festival in north Wales, UK
- Hammerfest FK, an association football team based in the Norwegian town
- The Caverns of Hammerfest, a browser-based video game by Motion-Twin
