= Snøsporvstranda =

Beach in Svalbard, Norway

Coordinates: 78.8496°N 28.1720°E

Snøsporvstranda is a beach at the western part of Kongsøya in Kong Karls Land, Svalbard. It has a length of about six kilometers, and is located south of the mountain Tordenskjoldberget.
