= 28th meridian =

28th meridian may refer to:

- 28th meridian east, a line of longitude east of the Greenwich Meridian
- 28th meridian west, a line of longitude west of the Greenwich Meridian
