= 152nd meridian =

152nd meridian may refer to:

- 152nd meridian east, a line of longitude east of the Greenwich Meridian
- 152nd meridian west, a line of longitude west of the Greenwich Meridian

152nd meridian west	152nd meridian east
