= 30th meridian east =

Line of longitude

30th meridian east

The meridian 30° east of Greenwich is a line of longitude that extends from the North Pole across the Arctic Ocean, Europe, Turkey, Africa, the Indian Ocean, the Southern Ocean, and Antarctica to the South Pole.

The 30th meridian east forms a great circle with the 150th meridian west.

The meridian is the mid point of Eastern European Time.

The 1992 BBC travel documentary Pole to Pole followed Michael Palin's journey along the 30° east meridian, which was selected as his travel axis as it covered the most land.

== From Pole to Pole ==
Starting at the North Pole and heading south to the South Pole, the 30th meridian east passes through:

Co-ordinates	Country, territory or sea	Notes
90°0′N 30°0′E	Arctic Ocean	
80°9′N 30°0′E	Barents Sea	Passing between the islands of Kongsøya and Abel Island, Svalbard, Norway
70°42′N 30°0′E	Norway	
70°4′N 30°0′E	Varangerfjord	
69°51′N 30°0′E	Norway	Passing just west of Kirkenes
69°25′N 30°0′E	Russia	
67°41′N 30°0′E	Finland	For about 8 km
67°37′N 30°0′E	Russia	
66°0′N 30°0′E	Finland	
65°41′N 30°0′E	Russia	
64°47′N 30°0′E	Finland	
63°45′N 30°0′E	Russia	For about 2 km
63°44′N 30°0′E	Finland	
61°45′N 30°0′E	Russia	
60°0′N 30°0′E	Baltic Sea	Gulf of Finland, 300 meters of Lisy Nos, Saint Petersburg coast
59°52′N 30°0′E	Russia	Passing just west of Saint Petersburg proper
55°51′N 30°0′E	Belarus	
51°29′N 30°0′E	Ukraine	
46°30′N 30°0′E	Moldova	For about 12 km
46°23′N 30°0′E	Ukraine	
45°44′N 30°0′E	Black Sea	
41°8′N 30°0′E	Turkey	
36°13′N 30°0′E	Mediterranean Sea	
31°17′N 30°0′E	Egypt	
22°0′N 30°0′E	Sudan	
10°17′N 30°0′E	South Sudan	
4°13′N 30°0′E	Democratic Republic of the Congo	
0°51′N 30°0′E	Uganda	
1°26′S 30°0′E	Rwanda	Passing just west of Kigali
2°21′S 30°0′E	Burundi	
4°18′S 30°0′E	Tanzania	
6°29′S 30°0′E	Lake Tanganyika	
7°8′S 30°0′E	Democratic Republic of the Congo	
8°19′S 30°0′E	Zambia	
15°38′S 30°0′E	Zimbabwe	
22°13′S 30°0′E	South Africa	Limpopo; Mpumalanga; KwaZulu-Natal; Eastern Cape
31°18′S 30°0′E	Indian Ocean	
60°0′S 30°0′E	Southern Ocean	
69°18′S 30°0′E	Antarctica	Queen Maud Land, claimed by Norway

== See also ==
- 29th meridian east
- 31st meridian east
- 169th meridian west, the meridian that crosses the least land
