= Nordneset =

Headland of Kongsøya, Svalbard

Coordinates: 78.9645°N 28.3736°E

Nordneset is a headland at the northern side of Kongsøya in Kong Karls Land, Svalbard. It defines the northeastern extension of the bay Bünsowbukta.
