= Tirpitzøya =

Island in Norway

Coordinates: 78°46′N 28°37′E

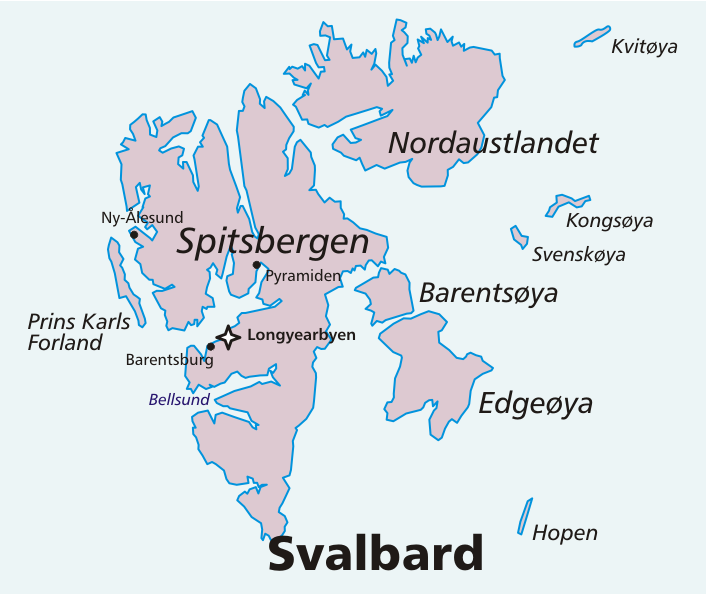
Svalbard peninsula

Tirpitzøya is an island in the Svalbard archipelago, one of the islands of Kong Karls Land. It has a length of about 3.3 kilometers, and is located outside the bay of Breibukta of Kongsøya. The island is named after German admiral Alfred von Tirpitz.

== See also ==
- List of islands of Norway
