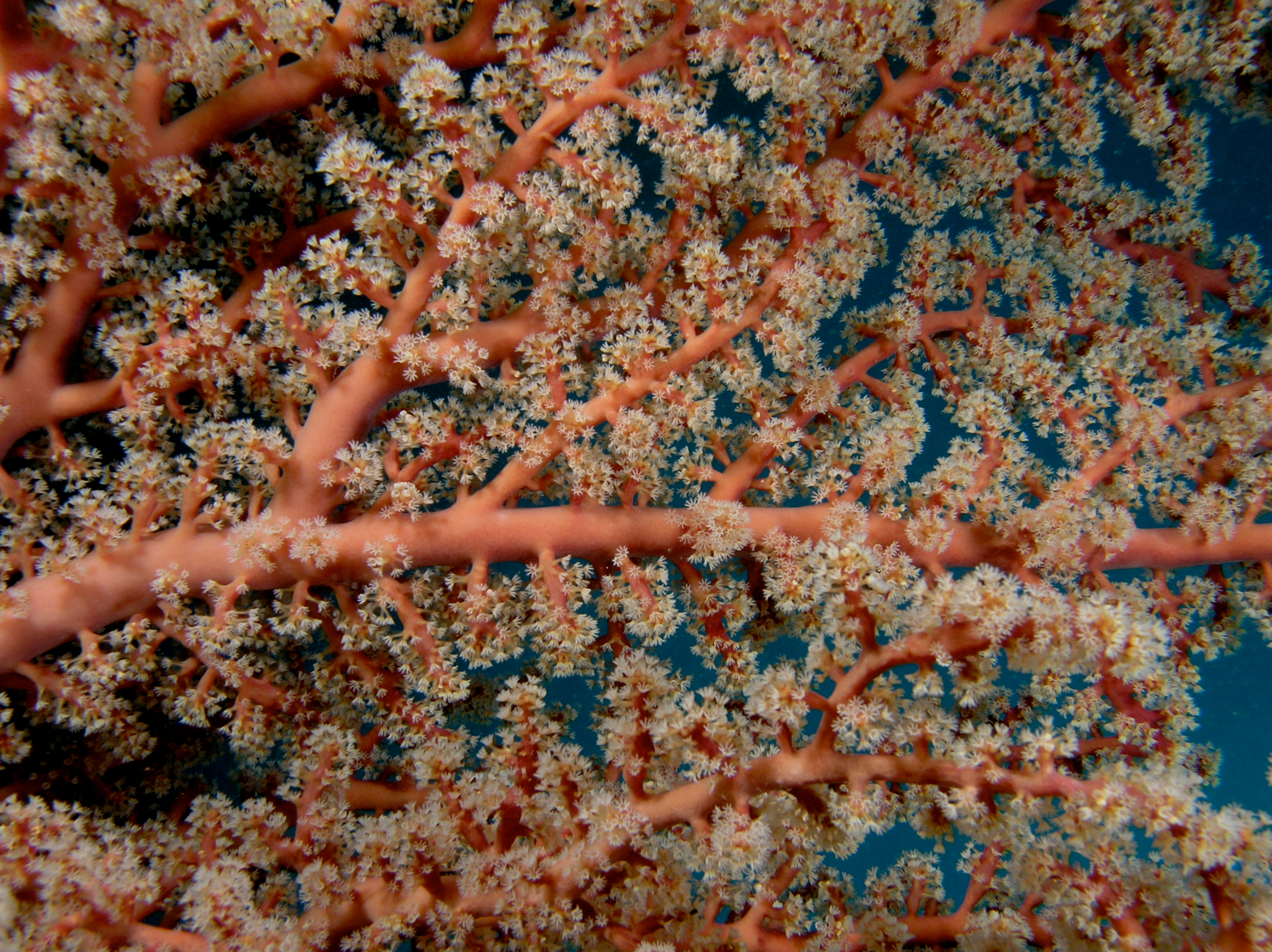

Scientific classification
- Kingdom: Animalia
- Phylum: Cnidaria
- Subphylum: Anthozoa
- Class: Octocorallia
- Order: Malacalcyonacea
- Family: Nidaliidae
- Genus: Siphonogorgia
- Species: S. godeffroyi

Binomial name
- Siphonogorgia godeffroyi Kölliker, 1874

= Siphonogorgia godeffroyi =

Species of coral

Siphonogorgia godeffroyi, the cherry blossom coral or Godeffroy's Soft Coral, is a species of soft coral in the family Nidaliidae. It is native to the central Indo-Pacific region. Its range includes Indonesia, the Philippines and Papua New Guinea. This species was first described in 1874 by the Swiss biologist Albert von Kölliker.

== Description ==
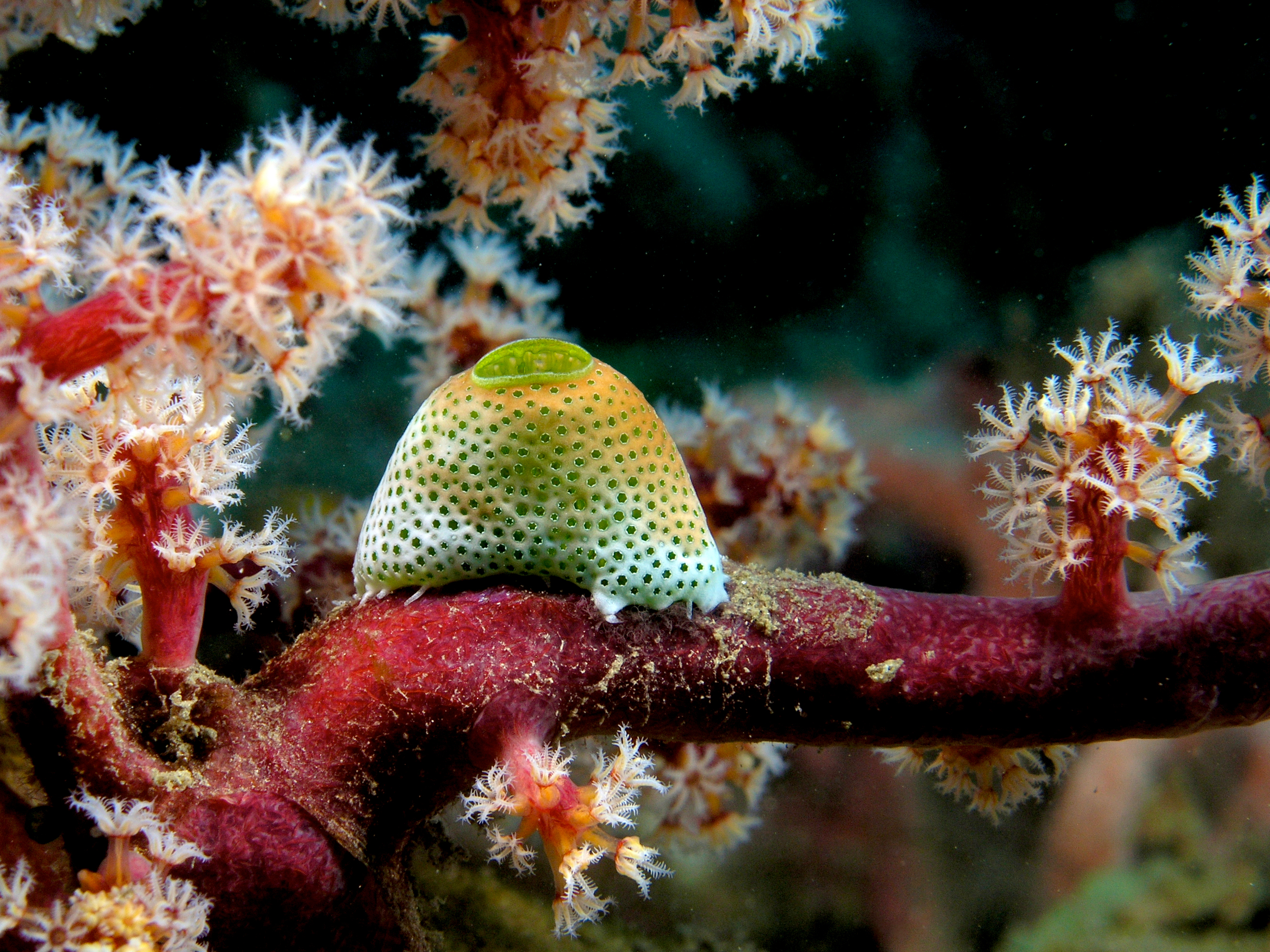
The tunicate Atriolum robustum on Siphonogorgia godeffroyi

Siphonogorgia godeffroyi is an arborescent coral with red or pink bare branches. The polyps are white and star-like and are concentrated on the tips of small branches. This species feeds on plankton. It is found at depths between 10 and 20 m (33 and 66 ft) and grows on both rocky and coral reefs, on rock ledges, on reef slopes and under overhangs.
