= 29th meridian =

29th meridian may refer to:

- 29th meridian east, a line of longitude east of the Greenwich Meridian
- 29th meridian west, a line of longitude west of the Greenwich Meridian
