= 151st meridian =

151st meridian can refer to:

- 151st meridian east, a line of longitude east of the Greenwich Meridian
- 151st meridian west, a line of longitude west of the Greenwich Meridian

151st meridian west	151st meridian east
