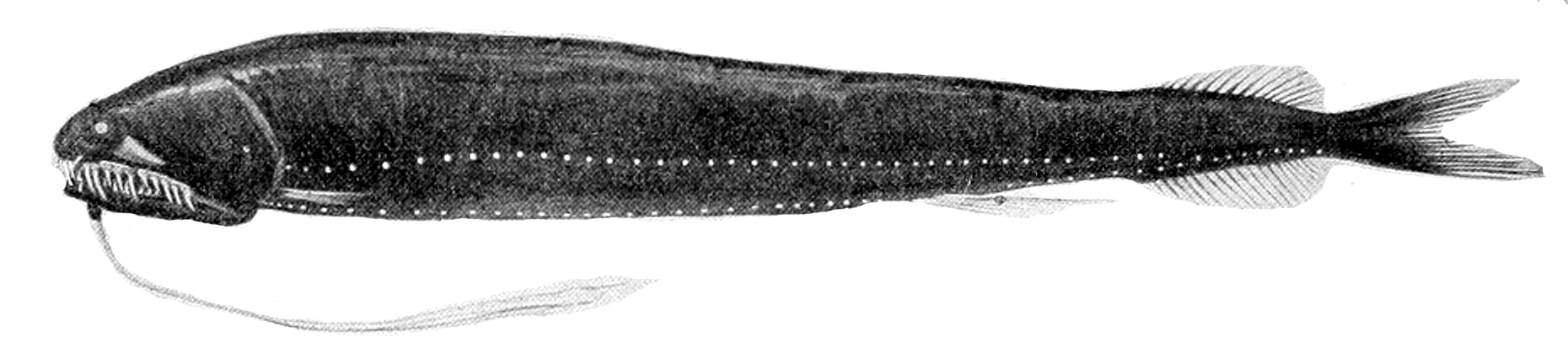
- Melanostomias melanops

Scientific classification
- Kingdom: Animalia
- Phylum: Chordata
- Class: Actinopterygii
- Order: Stomiiformes
- Family: Stomiidae
- Subfamily: Melanostomiinae
- Genus: Melanostomias; A. B. Brauer, 1902

= Melanostomias =

Genus of fishes

Melanostomias is a genus of barbeled dragonfishes.

== Species ==
There are currently 17 recognized species in this genus:

- Melanostomias bartonbeani A. E. Parr, 1927 (Scaleless black dragonfish)
- Melanostomias biseriatus Regan & Trewavas, 1930
- Melanostomias dio Bárbara Teixeira Villarins, Luciano Gomes Fischer, Prokofiev and Michael Maia Mincarone. 2023
- Melanostomias globulifer Fowler, 1934 (Brightchin dragonfish)
- Melanostomias macrophotus Regan & Trewavas, 1930
- Melanostomias margaritifer Regan & Trewavas, 1930
- Melanostomias melanopogon Regan & Trewavas, 1930
- Melanostomias melanops A. B. Brauer, 1902
- Melanostomias niger Gilchrist & von Bonde, 1924 (Fangtooth dragonfish)
- Melanostomias nigroaxialis Parin & Pokhil'skaya, 1978
- Melanostomias paucilaternatus Parin & Pokhil'skaya, 1978 (Spothead dragonfish)
- Melanostomias pauciradius Matsubara, 1938 (Three-ray dragonfish)
- Melanostomias pollicifer Parin & Pokhil'skaya, 1978
- Melanostomias stewarti Fowler, 1934
- Melanostomias tentaculatus (Regan & Trewavas, 1930) (Tentacle dragonfish)
- Melanostomias valdiviae A. B. Brauer, 1902 (Valdivia black dragonfish)
- Melanostomias vierecki Fowler, 1934
