= Bünsowbukta =

Bay of Svalbard

Coordinates: 78.9304°N 28.3554°E

Bünsowbukta is a bay at the western part of Kongsøya in Kong Karls Land, Svalbard. It is located between the headlands of Kapp Koburg and Nordneset, at the northwestern side of the island. The bay is named after Friedrich Christian Ernestus Bünsow.
