= Kyrkjevika =

Bay of Svalbard

Coordinates: 78.6720°N 26.6990°E

Kyrkjevika (The Church Bay) is a bay at the southwestern coast of Svenskøya in Kong Karls Land, Svalbard. Kyrkjevika is partly sheltered by Antarcticøya and other islands.
