= Antarcticøya =

Island in Svalbard, Norway

Coordinates: 78.6727°N 26.6303°E

Antarcticøya is an island at the southwestern coast of Svenskøya in Kong Karls Land, Svalbard. It is located outside the bay of Kyrkjevika. The island is named after the ship Antarctic. Antarcticøya is the largest among several small islands at the outer part of Kyrkjevika.
