= Kennedyneset =

Headland of Kongsøya, Svalbard

Coordinates: 78.8707°N 27.8199°E

Kennedyneset is a headland at Kongsøya in Kong Karls Land, Svalbard. It is the most western point of the island. The headland is named after Swedish businessperson George Douglas Kennedy. Kennedyneset defines the southwestern extension of the bay Vrakbukta.
