= Kükenthal =

Kükenthal is a German surname. Notable people with the surname include:

- Willy Kükenthal (1861–1922), German zoologist
- Georg Kükenthal (1864–1955), German pastor and botanist, brother of Willy
- Fitz Kükenthal (1893–1974), German illustrator
