= Tordenskjoldberget =

Mountain in Svalbard, Norway

Coordinates: 78.8695°N 28.1861°E

Tordenskjoldberget is a mountain on the island of Kongsøya in Kong Karls Land, Svalbard. It is named after naval officer Peter Tordenskjold. The mountain is located at the western side of the island, south of Retziusfjellet and is separated from Sjögrenfjellet by the mountain pass Passet.
