= Lydiannasundet =

Strait in Svalbard, Norway

Coordinates: 78°56′46″N 29°55′16″E

Lydiannasundet is a strait in the Svalbard archipelago, separating Kongsøya from Abel Island, both in Kong Karls Land. It is named after the vessel Lydianna, used for exploration of Kong Karls Land in 1872.
