= Johnsenberget =

Mountain in Svalbard, Norway

Coordinates: 78.8958°N 29.4467°E

Johnsenberget is a mountain at Kongsøya of the Kong Karls Land, Svalbard. It has a height of 235 m.a.s.l., and is located at the eastern part of the island, between Koppelvatna and Rundisflya, north of Andréebukta. The mountain is named after captain Nils Johnsen, who climbed the mountain in 1872.

== Geology ==
Johnsenberget has a basaltic top overlying Jurassic sediments.
