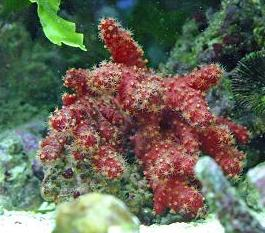

Scientific classification
- Kingdom: Animalia
- Phylum: Cnidaria
- Subphylum: Anthozoa
- Class: Octocorallia
- Order: Malacalcyonacea
- Family: Nephthyigorgiidae; McFadden, van Ofwegen & Quattrini, 2024
- Genus: Nephthyigorgia; Kükenthal, 1910

= Nephthyigorgia =

Genus of corals

Nephthyigorgia is a genus of soft corals of the monotypic family Nephthyigorgiidae. The genus was formerly place in family Nidaliidae.

== Species ==
The World Register of Marine Species lists the following species as accepted.

- Nephthyigorgia annectans. (Thomson & Simpson, 1909)
- Nephthyigorgia aurantiaca. Kükenthal, 1910
- Nephthyigorgia crassa. Kükenthal, 1910
- Nephthyigorgia kükenthali. Broch, 1916
- Nephthyigorgia pinnata. Kükenthal, 1910
