= Melanostomias niger =

Scientific classification
- Kingdom: Animalia
- Phylum: Chordata
- Class: Actinopterygii
- Order: Stomiiformes
- Family: Stomiidae
- Genus: Melanostomias
- Species: M. niger

Binomial name
- Melanostomias niger Gilchrist & von Bonde, 1924

Species of fish

Melanostomias niger, the fangtooth dragonfish, is a species of fish from the Melanostomias genus that is native to the Eastern Indian Ocean, Southeast Atlantic and Southwest Pacific. It measures up to 26 cm (10 in) in length, and has between 17 and 20 anal soft rays and 15 to 17 anal spines.
