= Melanostomias pollicifer =

Conservation status
- Least Concern (IUCN 3.1)

Scientific classification
- Kingdom: Animalia
- Phylum: Chordata
- Class: Actinopterygii
- Order: Stomiiformes
- Family: Stomiidae
- Genus: Melanostomias
- Species: M. pollicifer

Binomial name
- Melanostomias pollicifer Parin & Pokhil'skaya, 1978

Species of fish

Melanostomias pollicifer is a species of fish endemic to the Indo-Pacific. It's a mesopelagic fish that inhabit waters in the tropical and subtropical zones.
