= Melanostomias globulifer =

Conservation status
- Least Concern (IUCN 3.1)

Scientific classification
- Kingdom: Animalia
- Phylum: Chordata
- Class: Actinopterygii
- Order: Stomiiformes
- Family: Stomiidae
- Genus: Melanostomias
- Species: M. globulifer

Binomial name
- Melanostomias globulifer Fowler, 1934

Species of fish

Melanostomias globulifer, the brightchin dragonfish, is a species of fish native to the Western Pacific. It is a mesopelagic fish and is found in depths of 544 m (1,785 ft).
