= Emoia kuekenthali =

Conservation status
- Least Concern (IUCN 3.1)

Scientific classification
- Kingdom: Animalia
- Phylum: Chordata
- Class: Reptilia
- Order: Squamata
- Family: Scincidae
- Genus: Emoia
- Species: E. kuekenthali

Binomial name
- Emoia kuekenthali (Boettger, 1895)

Synonyms
- Lygosoma kuekenthali Boettger, 1895

Species of lizard

Kuekenthal's emo skink (Emoia kuekenthali) is a species of lizard in the subfamily Eugongylinae of the family Scincidae. The species is native to Indonesia and the Admiralty Islands. There are two recognized subspecies.

== Etymology ==
The specific name, kuekenthali, is in honor of German zoologist Wilhelm "Willy" Georg Kükenthal.

== Habitat ==
The preferred natural habitat of E. kuekenthali is forest.

== Reproduction ==
E. kuekenthali is oviparous.

== Subspecies ==
Two subspecies are recognized as being valid, including the nominotypical subspecies.

- Emoia kuekenthali kuekenthali (Boettger, 1895)
- Emoia kuekenthali notomoluccense (Brongersma, 1931)

Nota bene: A trinomial authority in parentheses indicates that the subspecies was originally described in a genus other than Emoia.
