= Melanostomias pauciradius =

Scientific classification
- Kingdom: Animalia
- Phylum: Chordata
- Class: Actinopterygii
- Order: Stomiiformes
- Family: Stomiidae
- Genus: Melanostomias
- Species: M. pauciradius

Binomial name
- Melanostomias pauciradius Matsubara, 1938

Species of fish

Melanostomias pauciradius, the three-ray dragonfish, is a species of barbeled dragonfish native to the Western Pacific. It has 18 to 20 anal soft rays, and 15 to 16 dorsal soft rays.
