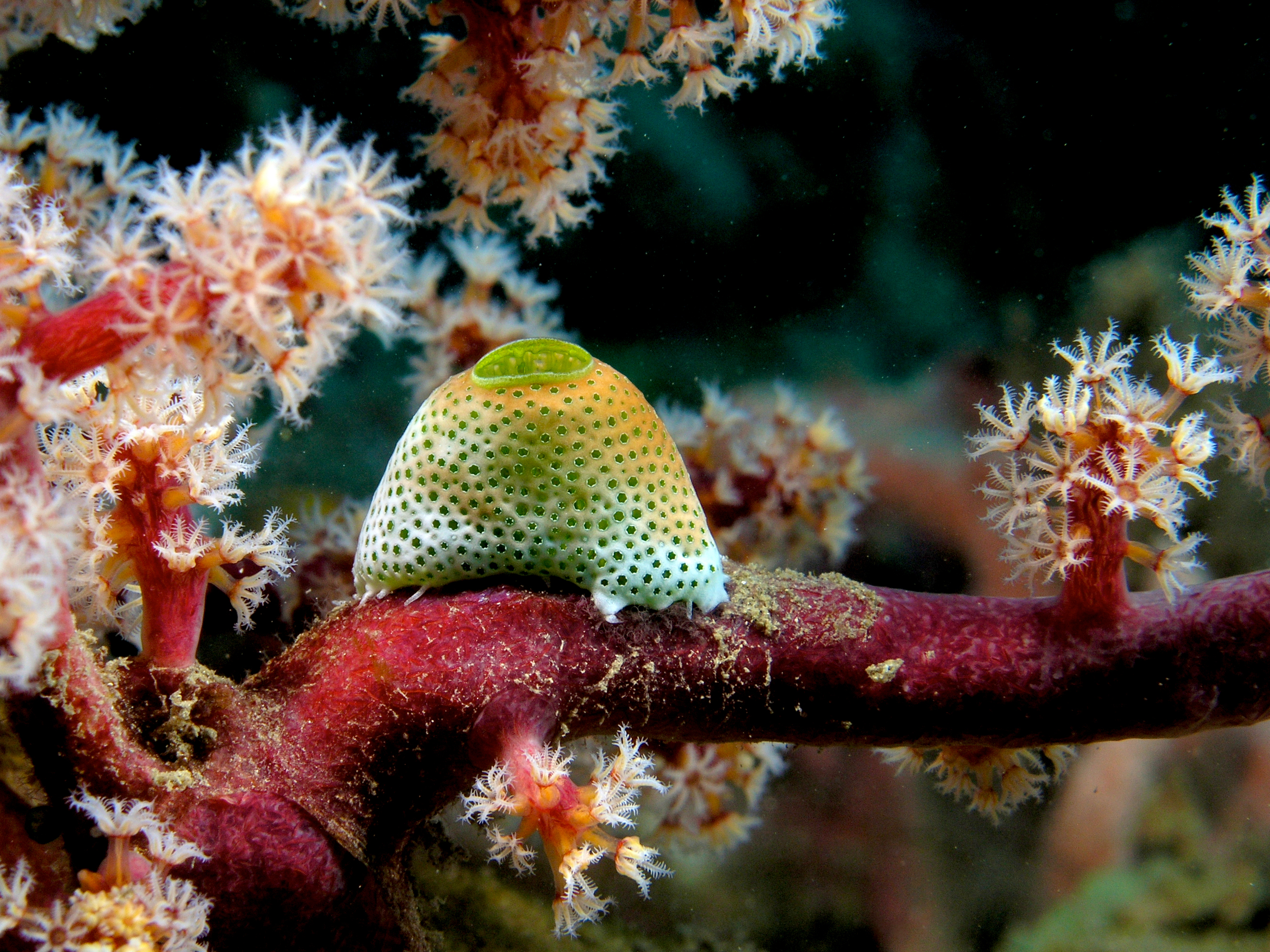
- Siphonogorgia godeffroyi with the tunicate Atriolum robustum

Scientific classification
- Kingdom: Animalia
- Phylum: Cnidaria
- Subphylum: Anthozoa
- Class: Octocorallia
- Order: Malacalcyonacea
- Family: Nidaliidae
- Genus: Siphonogorgia; Kölliker, 1874

Species
- See text

= Siphonogorgia =

Genus of corals

Siphonogorgia is a genus of soft corals in the family Nidaliidae. Like other members of this family, these corals do not contain symbiotic zooxanthellae.

== Species ==
The World Register of Marine Species includes the following species in the genus:

- Siphonogorgia agassizii (Deichmann, 1936)
- Siphonogorgia alba Utinomi, 1960
- Siphonogorgia alexandri (Nutting, 1908)
- Siphonogorgia annectens Thomson & Simpson, 1909
- Siphonogorgia annulata (Harrison, 1908)
- Siphonogorgia asperula Thomson & Simpson, 1909
- Siphonogorgia boschmai Verseveldt, 1966
- Siphonogorgia caribaea (Deichmann, 1936)
- Siphonogorgia chalmersae Verseveldt, 1966
- Siphonogorgia collaris Nutting, 1908
- Siphonogorgia crassa (Wright & Studer, 1889)
- Siphonogorgia cylindrita Kükenthal, 1896
- Siphonogorgia densa Chalmers, 1928
- Siphonogorgia dipsacea (Wright & Studer, 1889)
- Siphonogorgia dofleini Kükenthal, 1906
- Siphonogorgia duriuscula Thomson & Simpson, 1909
- Siphonogorgia eminens Chalmers, 1928
- Siphonogorgia flavocapitata (Harrison, 1908)
- Siphonogorgia fragilis Verseveldt, 1965
- Siphonogorgia godeffroyi Kölliker, 1874
- Siphonogorgia gracilis (Harrison, 1908)
- Siphonogorgia grandior Chalmers, 1928
- Siphonogorgia harrisoni Thomson & Mackinnon, 1910
- Siphonogorgia hicksoni Thomson & Mackinnon, 1910
- Siphonogorgia indica Thomson, 1905
- Siphonogorgia intermedia Thomson & Henderson, 1906
- Siphonogorgia koellikeri Wright & Studer, 1889
- Siphonogorgia lobata Verseveldt, 1982
- Siphonogorgia macrospiculata (Thomson & Henderson, 1906)
- Siphonogorgia macrospina Whitelegge, 1897
- Siphonogorgia media Thomson & Simpson, 1909
- Siphonogorgia miniacea Kükenthal, 1896
- Siphonogorgia mirabilis Klunziger, 1877
- Siphonogorgia obspiculata Chalmers, 1928
- Siphonogorgia obtusa Chalmers, 1928
- Siphonogorgia pallida Studer, 1889
- Siphonogorgia palmata Thomson & Simpson, 1909
- Siphonogorgia pauciflora Chalmers, 1928
- Siphonogorgia pendula Studer, 1889
- Siphonogorgia pichoni Verseveldt, 1971
- Siphonogorgia planoramosa Harrison, 1908
- Siphonogorgia purpurea (Harrison, 1908)
- Siphonogorgia pustulosa Studer, 1889
- Siphonogorgia ramosa Chalmers, 1928
- Siphonogorgia retractilis (Harrison, 1908)
- Siphonogorgia robusta Thomson & Mackinnon, 1910
- Siphonogorgia rotunda Harrison, 1908
- Siphonogorgia rugosa Chalmers, 1928
- Siphonogorgia scoparia Wright & Studer, 1889
- Siphonogorgia simplex Chalmers, 1928
- Siphonogorgia siphonogorgica (Harrison, 1908)
- Siphonogorgia splendens Kükenthal, 1906
- Siphonogorgia squarrosa Studer, 1878
- Siphonogorgia variabilis (Hickson, 1903)
