= Erik Eriksen (explorer) =

Norwegian explorer

Erik Eriksen (25 February 1820 - died 1888) was a Norwegian polar captain. Eriksen was the first to sight and shore Kong Karls Land, commemorated by the strait Erik Eriksenstretet. Eriksen also contributed to the invention of the grenade harpoon used in modern whaling.

== Biography ==
Erik Eriksen was born at Lyngør in Aust-Agder, Norway. In 1844, he moved to Hammerfest in Finnmark, Norway. He sailed as a helmsman and from 1846 as skipper in the surrounding fishing grounds. He also married Anna Birgitte Dehle (1825–1895) with whom he had 10 children. Eriksen was the first to sight and shore Kong Karls Land; the strait Erik Eriksenstretet between Kong Karls Land and Nordaustlandet, commemorates him.

He later designed a whale harpoon which he carved into a wooden model. He subsequently travelled to Tønsberg to meet with whaling and shipping magnate Svend Foyn to present him with the model of a proposed grenade harpoon. In July 1868 Erik Eriksen emigrated to the United States leaving his wife and children in Norway. In 1870, Svend Foyn successfully patented and pioneered the modern exploding whaling harpoon and gun. He industrialized production and use of the deck cannons and heavy-caliber harpoons. Erik Eriksen gained neither profits nor the honor for his contribution as Foyn had financed production and development of the harpoon and it was designed while Eriksen was employed by him. However, Svend Foyn did provide financial assistance to Eriksen's family in Hammerfest.

Erik Eriksen later died during a blizzard in Dakota Territory. (Most likely the "Schoolhouse Blizzard" of 1888).

== See also ==
- Whaling in Norway
