= Melanostomias macrophotus =

Scientific classification
- Kingdom: Animalia
- Phylum: Chordata
- Class: Actinopterygii
- Order: Stomiiformes
- Family: Stomiidae
- Genus: Melanostomias
- Species: M. macrophotus

Binomial name
- Melanostomias macrophotus Regan & Trewavas, 1930

Species of fish

Melanostomias macrophotus is a species of fish of the genus Melanostomias. It is endemic to the Eastern and Western Central Atlantic. It's bathypelagic and can be found in depths of 530 to 945 m (1,739 to 3,100 ft). The longest specimen of the species measured 23.0 cm (9.1 in). The species is black, and has around 14 to 15 dorsal soft rays and 18 anal soft rays. This quite thin and long fish has a dull snout.
