= Melanostomias paucilaternatus =

Scientific classification
- Kingdom: Animalia
- Phylum: Chordata
- Class: Actinopterygii
- Order: Stomiiformes
- Family: Stomiidae
- Genus: Melanostomias
- Species: M. paucilaternatus

Binomial name
- Melanostomias paucilaternatus Parin & Pokhil'skaya, 1978

Species of fish

Melanostomias paucilaternatus, the spothead dragonfish, is a species of fish from the Melanostomias genus. It is found in the South Atlantic and the Indo-West Pacific in a depth of about 1,000 m (3,300 ft). It has a maximum length of 20.1 cm (7.9 in). It has 16 to 18 anal soft rays and 13 to 16 dorsal soft rays.
