= Melanostomias stewarti =

Scientific classification
- Kingdom: Animalia
- Phylum: Chordata
- Class: Actinopterygii
- Order: Stomiiformes
- Family: Stomiidae
- Genus: Melanostomias
- Species: M. stewarti

Binomial name
- Melanostomias stewarti Fowler, 1934

Species of fish

Melanostomias stewarti is a species of fish that inhabits bathypelagic marine environments in the Philippines. It's also found in the Pacific Ocean.
