= Melanostomias nigroaxialis =

Scientific classification
- Kingdom: Animalia
- Phylum: Chordata
- Class: Actinopterygii
- Order: Stomiiformes
- Family: Stomiidae
- Genus: Melanostomias
- Species: M. nigroaxialis

Binomial name
- Melanostomias nigroaxialis Parin & Pokhil'skaya, 1978

Species of barbeled dragonfish

Melanostomias nigroaxialis is a species of barbeled dragonfish native to the Western Central Pacific. The species is bathypelagic and inhabits deep water.
