= Rundisflya =

Plain in Kong Karls Land, Svalbard, Norway

Coordinates: 78.8820°N 29.1834°E

Rundisflya is a plain at the eastern part of Kongsøya in Kong Karls Land, Svalbard. It is located west of the mountain Johnsenberget, and generally has a height of 50 m.a.s.l. or higher. Rundisflya is named after the glacier Rundisen, which covers part of the plain.
