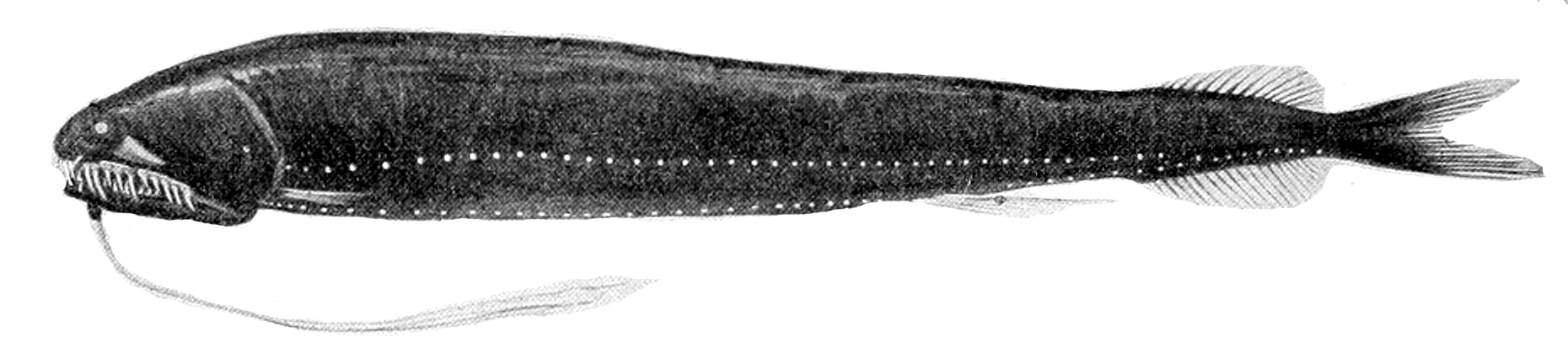

Scientific classification
- Domain: Eukaryota
- Kingdom: Animalia
- Phylum: Chordata
- Class: Actinopterygii
- Order: Stomiiformes
- Family: Stomiidae
- Genus: Melanostomias
- Species: M. melanops

Binomial name
- Melanostomias melanops Brauer, 1902

= Melanostomias melanops =

Species of fish

Melanostomias melanops is a species of fish endemic to the Atlantic, Indian and Pacific oceans. It occurs in depths of 350 to 1,024 m (1,148 to 3,360 ft), meaning they are a bathypelagic fish. Its hue is black and it has dark blotches. It has 13 and 15 dorsal and anal soft rays, respectively. The longest specimen was 26 cm (10 in) in length.
