= 29th meridian east =

Line of longitude

29th meridian east

The meridian 29° east of Greenwich is a line of longitude that extends from the North Pole across the Arctic Ocean, Europe, Africa, the Indian Ocean, the Southern Ocean, and Antarctica to the South Pole.

The 29th meridian east forms a great circle with the 151st meridian west.

The meridian defines the eastern border of the Abyei area, which is disputed between Sudan and South Sudan.

== From Pole to Pole ==
Starting at the North Pole and heading south to the South Pole, the 29th meridian east passes through:

| Co-ordinates | Country, territory or sea | Notes |
|---|---|---|
| 90°0′N 29°0′E | Arctic Ocean | |
| 78°56′N 29°0′E | Norway | Island of Kongsøya, Svalbard |
| 78°53′N 29°0′E | Barents Sea | |
| 70°52′N 29°0′E | Norway | |
| 69°43′N 29°0′E | Finland | |
| 69°18′N 29°0′E | Norway | |
| 69°2′N 29°0′E | Russia | |
| 68°8′N 29°0′E | Finland | |
| 61°11′N 29°0′E | Russia | |
| 60°12′N 29°0′E | Baltic Sea | Gulf of Finland |
| 59°49′N 29°0′E | Russia | |
| 56°2′N 29°0′E | Belarus | |
| 51°34′N 29°0′E | Ukraine | |
| 47°58′N 29°0′E | Moldova | Passing through the de facto independent, but unrecognised state of Transnistria |
| 46°29′N 29°0′E | Ukraine | |
| 46°14′N 29°0′E | Moldova | For about 11 km |
| 46°9′N 29°0′E | Ukraine | For about 7 km |
| 46°4′N 29°0′E | Moldova | For about 4 km |
| 46°2′N 29°0′E | Ukraine | |
| 45°21′N 29°0′E | Romania | |
| 44°40′N 29°0′E | Black Sea | |
| 41°15′N 29°0′E | Turkey | 25 km. Thrace, Passing through Istanbul and neighbouring areas |
| 41°2′N 29°0′E | Sea of Marmara | |
| 40°39′N 29°0′E | Turkey | 19 km. Anatolia (Armutlu Peninsula) |
| 40°28′N 29°0′E | Sea of Marmara | Gemlik Bay |
| 40°22′N 29°0′E | Turkey | 430 km. Anatolia |
| 36°43′N 29°0′E | Mediterranean Sea | |
| 30°50′N 29°0′E | Egypt | |
| 22°0′N 29°0′E | Sudan | |
| 10°10′N 29°0′E | Border of Abyei and Sudan proper | Abyei is controlled by Sudan, and claimed by South Sudan |
| 9°40′N 29°0′E | South Sudan | |
| 4°29′N 29°0′E | Democratic Republic of the Congo | |
| 2°18′S 29°0′E | Rwanda | |
| 2°42′S 29°0′E | Democratic Republic of the Congo | For about 8 km |
| 2°47′S 29°0′E | Burundi | For about 4 km |
| 2°49′S 29°0′E | Democratic Republic of the Congo | |
| 8°27′S 29°0′E | Zambia | Passing through Lake Mweru |
| 12°17′S 29°0′E | Democratic Republic of the Congo | |
| 13°25′S 29°0′E | Zambia | |
| 15°56′S 29°0′E | Zimbabwe | Passing through Lake Kariba |
| 21°46′S 29°0′E | Botswana | |
| 22°16′S 29°0′E | South Africa | Limpopo; Mpumalanga; Gauteng - for about 14 km Mpumalanga; Free State; KwaZulu-Natal |
| 28°55′S 29°0′E | Lesotho | |
| 30°1′S 29°0′E | South Africa | Eastern Cape |
| 32°9′S 29°0′E | Indian Ocean | |
| 60°0′S 29°0′E | Southern Ocean | |
| 69°45′S 29°0′E | Antarctica | Queen Maud Land, claimed by Norway |

== See also ==
- 28th meridian east
- 30th meridian east
