= Melanostomias melanopogon =

Scientific classification
- Kingdom: Animalia
- Phylum: Chordata
- Class: Actinopterygii
- Order: Stomiiformes
- Family: Stomiidae
- Genus: Melanostomias
- Species: M. melanopogon

Binomial name
- Melanostomias melanopogon Regan & Trewavas, 1930

Species of fish

Melanostomias melanopogon is a species of fish from the family Stomiidae and the Stomiiformes order. The species can be found in the deep waters of the Eastern and Western Atlantic. It has a maximum length of 15.3 cm (6.0 in), and a long, slim body, dull snout and black scales.
