= Calamorhabdium =

Scientific classification
- Kingdom: Animalia
- Phylum: Chordata
- Class: Reptilia
- Order: Squamata
- Suborder: Serpentes
- Family: Colubridae
- Subfamily: Calamariinae
- Genus: Calamorhabdium; Boettger, 1898

Species
- Two recognized species, see article.

Genus of snakes

Calamorhabdium is a small genus of snakes, commonly known as iridescent snakes, in the family Colubridae. The genus contains two described species. Both species are burrowing snakes found in Asia.

== Species ==
- Calamorhabdium acuticeps Ahl, 1933 – Sulawesi iridescent snake
- Calamorhabdium kuekenthali Boettger, 1898 – Batjan iridescent snake

== Etymology ==
The specific name, kuekenthali, is in honor of German zoologist Willy Kükenthal.
