= Melanostomias valdiviae =

Scientific classification
- Domain: Eukaryota
- Kingdom: Animalia
- Phylum: Chordata
- Class: Actinopterygii
- Order: Stomiiformes
- Family: Stomiidae
- Genus: Melanostomias
- Species: M. valdiviae

Binomial name
- Melanostomias valdiviae Brauer, 1902

Species of fish

Melanostomias valdiviae is a species of dragonfish native to the Pacific, Atlantic, and Indian oceans. This long and thin fish is bathypelagic and can be found in depths of 40–1,600 m (130–5,250 ft). The species, with its black hue and dull snout, can grow up to 24.1 cm (9.5 in).
