= Erik Eriksenstretet =

Strait in Svalbard, Norway

Coordinates: 79°09′N 26°33′E

Erik Eriksenstretet is a strait in the Svalbard archipelago, separating Kong Karls Land from Nordaustlandet. It is named after skipper and seal hunter Erik Eriksen, who reportedly discovered Kong Karls Land in 1853, and was the first to enter the islands six years later.
