= Melanostomias biseriatus =

Scientific classification
- Kingdom: Animalia
- Phylum: Chordata
- Class: Actinopterygii
- Order: Stomiiformes
- Family: Stomiidae
- Genus: Melanostomias
- Species: M. biseriatus

Binomial name
- Melanostomias biseriatus Regan & Trewavas, 1930

Species of fish

Melanostomias biseriatus is a species of ray-finned fish native to the deep waters of the Eastern Atlantic. It's a fairly long fish and the longest specimen measured 25 cm (9.8 in). It's bathypelagic and can be found in depths of 620–760 m (2,030–2,490 ft).
