= Melanostomias dio =

Scientific classification
- Kingdom: Animalia
- Phylum: Chordata
- Class: Actinopterygii
- Order: Stomiiformes
- Family: Stomiidae
- Genus: Melanostomias
- Species: M. dio

Binomial name
- Melanostomias dio Bárbara Teixeira Villarins, Luciano Gomes Fischer, Prokofiev and Michael Maia Mincarone. 2023

Species of fish

The Noronha dragonfish (Melanostomias dio) is a species of ray-finned fish from the family Stomiidae. It's native to the Western Atlantic, being more restricted to Fernando de Noronha Archipelago, in Brazil. in its scientific name, pays homage to the metal singer Ronnie James Dio, because the shiny lure located below the mouth, is very similar to a hand signal that heavy metal fans and musicians use.
