= Melanostomias vierecki =

Scientific classification
- Kingdom: Animalia
- Phylum: Chordata
- Class: Actinopterygii
- Order: Stomiiformes
- Family: Stomiidae
- Genus: Melanostomias
- Species: M. vierecki

Binomial name
- Melanostomias vierecki Fowler, 1934

Species of fish

Melanostomias vierecki is a species of dragonfish endemic to the Philippines. The type specimen was caught at a depth of 1,105 m (3,625 ft). The species lives in bathypelagic marine environments.
