= Melanostomias tentaculatus =

Scientific classification
- Kingdom: Animalia
- Phylum: Chordata
- Class: Actinopterygii
- Order: Stomiiformes
- Family: Stomiidae
- Genus: Melanostomias
- Species: M. tentaculatus

Binomial name
- Melanostomias tentaculatus Regan & Trewavas, 1930

Species of fish

Melanostomias tentaculatus is a species of barbeled dragonfish. It occurs in the Eastern and Western Atlantic, as well as the Pacific and Indian oceans. In total, it has roughly 19–20 anal and 16–17 dorsal soft rays. Along with its long, slim body, it has a dull snout and a maximum length of 24 cm (9.4 in). They also inhabit waters at depths of 30–950 m (98–3,117 ft).
