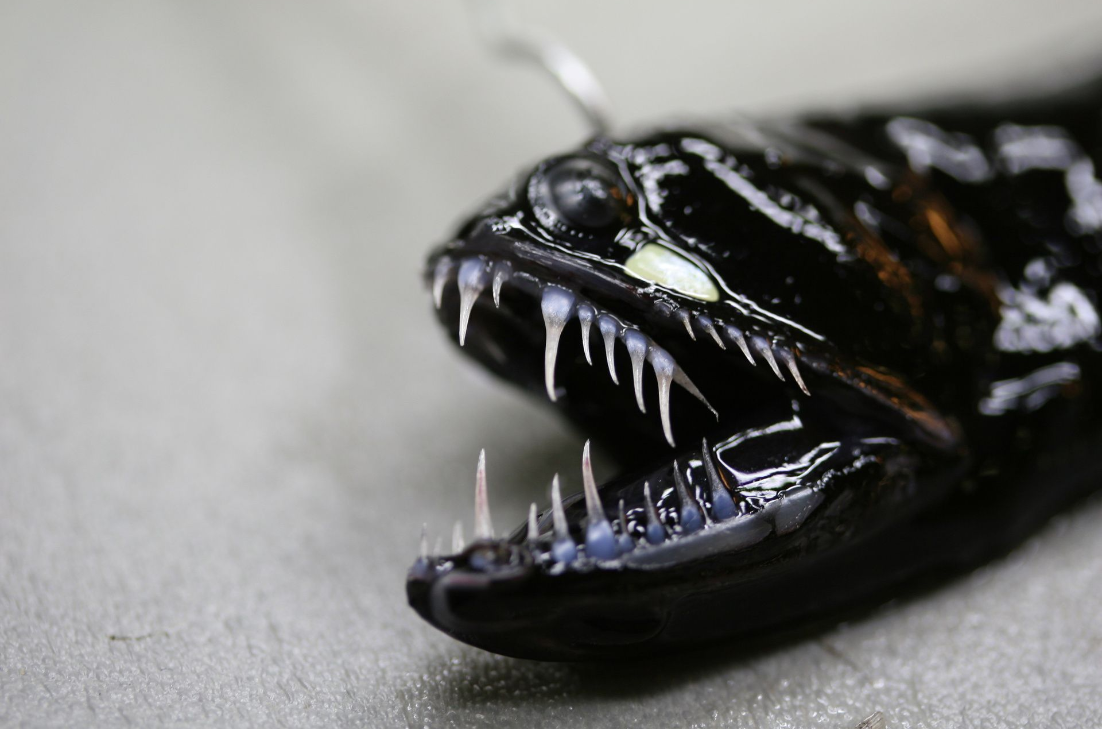

Conservation status
- Least Concern (IUCN 3.1)

Scientific classification
- Kingdom: Animalia
- Phylum: Chordata
- Class: Actinopterygii
- Division: Teleostei
- Order: Stomiiformes
- Family: Stomiidae
- Genus: Melanostomias
- Species: M. bartonbeani

Binomial name
- Melanostomias bartonbeani Parr, 1927

= Scaleless black dragonfish =

Species of fish

The scaleless black dragonfish (Melanostomias bartonbeani) also known as the scaleless dragonfish is a species of ray-finned fish from the family Stomiiidae. It's native to the Eastern, Western and Northwest Atlantic, as well as the Indian and Pacific oceans. The species is mesopelagic. It can be found in depths of 25 to 2,000 m (82 to 6,562 ft).
