= Breibukta =

Bay of Svalbard

Coordinates: 78.8441°N 28.7051°E

Breibukta is a bay at the southern side of Kongsøya in Kong Karls Land, Svalbard. It stretches from Kapp Altmann via Helgoland Island to Vestre Tømmerpynten at the headland Tømmerneset.
