= Tømmerneset (Kongsøya) =

Headland of Kongsøya, Svalbard

- Cape
- Coordinates: 78°50′35″N 29°16′58″E
- Location: Kongsøya, Svalbard, Norway

Tømmerneset is a headland at the southeastern side of Kongsøya in Kong Karls Land, Svalbard. The headland has two named points, Vestre Tømmerpynten and Austre Tømmerpynten. Vestre Tømmerpynten defines the eastern extension of the bay Breibukta.
