= Helgoland Island =

Island in Norway

Native name: Helgolandøya
- Location within Svalbard

Geography
- Coordinates: 78.7889°N 28.6614°E
- Area: 13 km^{2} (5.0 sq mi)

Administration
- Norway

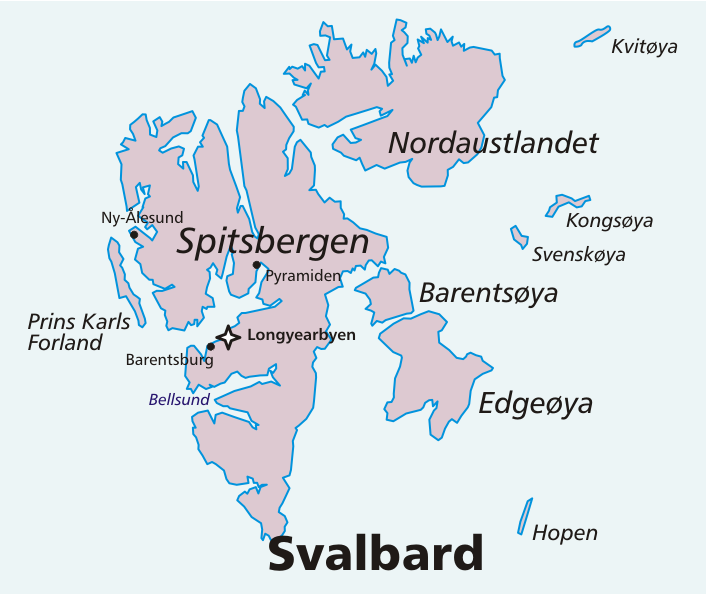
Map of Svalbard, showing Svenskøya

Helgoland Island (Norwegian: Helgolandøya) is an island in the Svalbard archipelago, one of the islands of Kong Karls Land. It is located in the bay of Breibukta of Kongsøya. The island is named after the vessel Helgoland.

== See also ==
- List of islands of Norway
