= Rundisen =

Glacier in Svalbard, Norway

Coordinates: 78.8919°N 29.1635°E

Rundisen is a small glacier at Kongsøya in Kong Karls Land, Svalbard. The glacier covers part of Rundisflya at the eastern part of Kongsøya, south of Svenskebukta. Former names are the English name The Circular Ice Cap and Swedish: Runda Iskalotten.
