= Melanostomias margaritifer =

Scientific classification
- Kingdom: Animalia
- Phylum: Chordata
- Class: Actinopterygii
- Order: Stomiiformes
- Family: Stomiidae
- Genus: Melanostomias
- Species: M. margaritifer

Binomial name
- Melanostomias margaritifer Regan & Trewavas, 1930

Species of fish

Melanostomias margaritifer is a species of fish from the family Stomiidae. The species occur in the Caribbean in the Northwest Atlantic. Its maximum length is around 8 cm (3.1 in) and its body is quite long. This pelagic-oceanic fish can be found 70 to 100 m (230 to 330 ft) below the water surface.
