= Fritz Schaudinn =

German zoologist

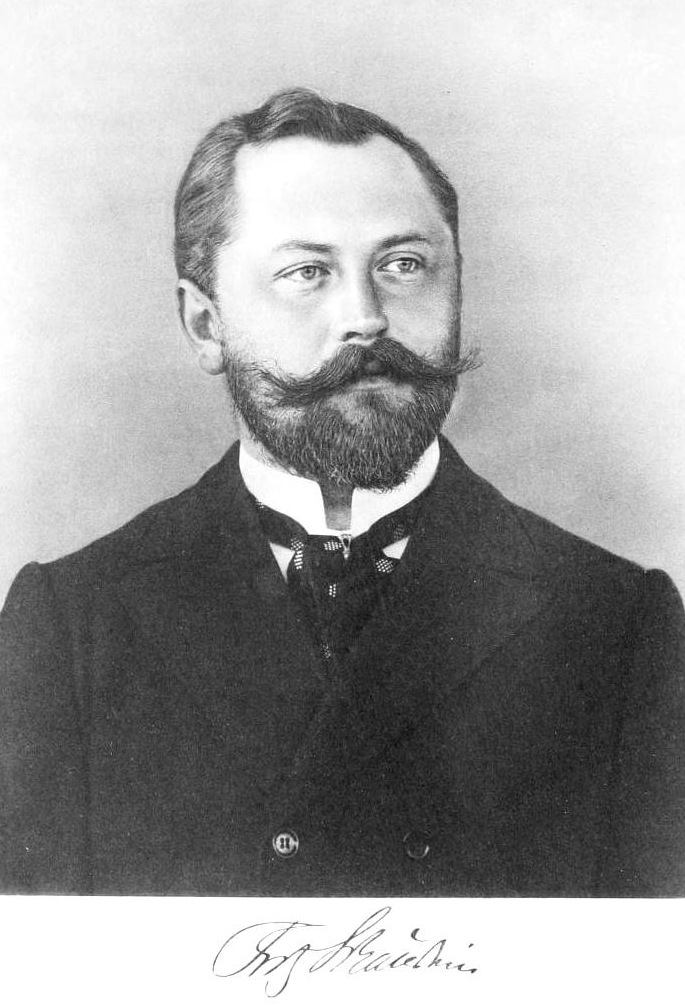
- Fritz Schaudinn
- Born: 19 September 1871; Röseningken, Province of Prussia
- Died: 22 June 1906 (aged 34); Hamburg
- Known for: medical advances against syphilis; protozoology
- Scientific career
- Fields: zoologist, protozoologist, microbiologist

Fritz Richard Schaudinn (19 September 1871 – 22 June 1906) was a German zoologist.

Born in Röseningken (now in Ozyorsky District) in the Province of Prussia, he co-discovered, with Erich Hoffmann in 1905, the causative agent of syphilis, Spirochaeta pallida (also known as Treponema pallidum). The work was carried out at the Berlin Charité.

Among Schaudinn's other contributions to medicine include his work in the field of amoebic dysentery, sleeping sickness and his confirmation of the work of Sir Ronald Ross and Giovanni Battista Grassi (1854–1925) in the field of malaria research. He also demonstrated that human hookworm infection is contracted through the skin of the feet. He made noted contributions to zoology and was one of the developers of protozoology as an experimental science. Schaudinn was a graduate in zoology of the Friedrich Wilhelm University in Berlin. Since 2002 an annual medical prize has been awarded in his name.

In 1898 with zoologist Fritz Römer (1866–1909), he participated on a scientific trip to Svalbard. Results of the expedition led to publication of Fauna Arctica, a project on Arctic fauna begun by Schaudinn and Römer and continued by August Brauer (1863–1917) and Walther Arndt (1891–1944).

Schaudinn died during his journey back to Germany from an International Medicine Meeting in Lisbon, when he underwent an urgent surgery aboard due to gastrointestinal amoebian abscesses. Such amoebian infection had probably been voluntarily acquired when he did research on amoebas. Schaudinn was a little under 35 years of age when he died in Hamburg.
