= 151st Field Artillery Brigade =

- Active: 1880-2008
- Country: United States
- Allegiance: South Carolina
- Branch: Army National Guard
- Role: Field Artillery
- Size: Brigade
- Garrison/HQ: Sumter, South Carolina
- Nickname: Gamecock Artillery
- Motto: Duty Above All
- Engagements: World War II; Tunisia; Sicily; Naples-Foggia; Rome-Arno; North Apennines; Po Valley
- Decorations: French Croix de Guerre

Insignia
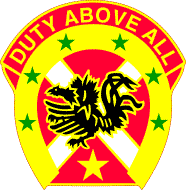
- 151st Field Artillery DUI

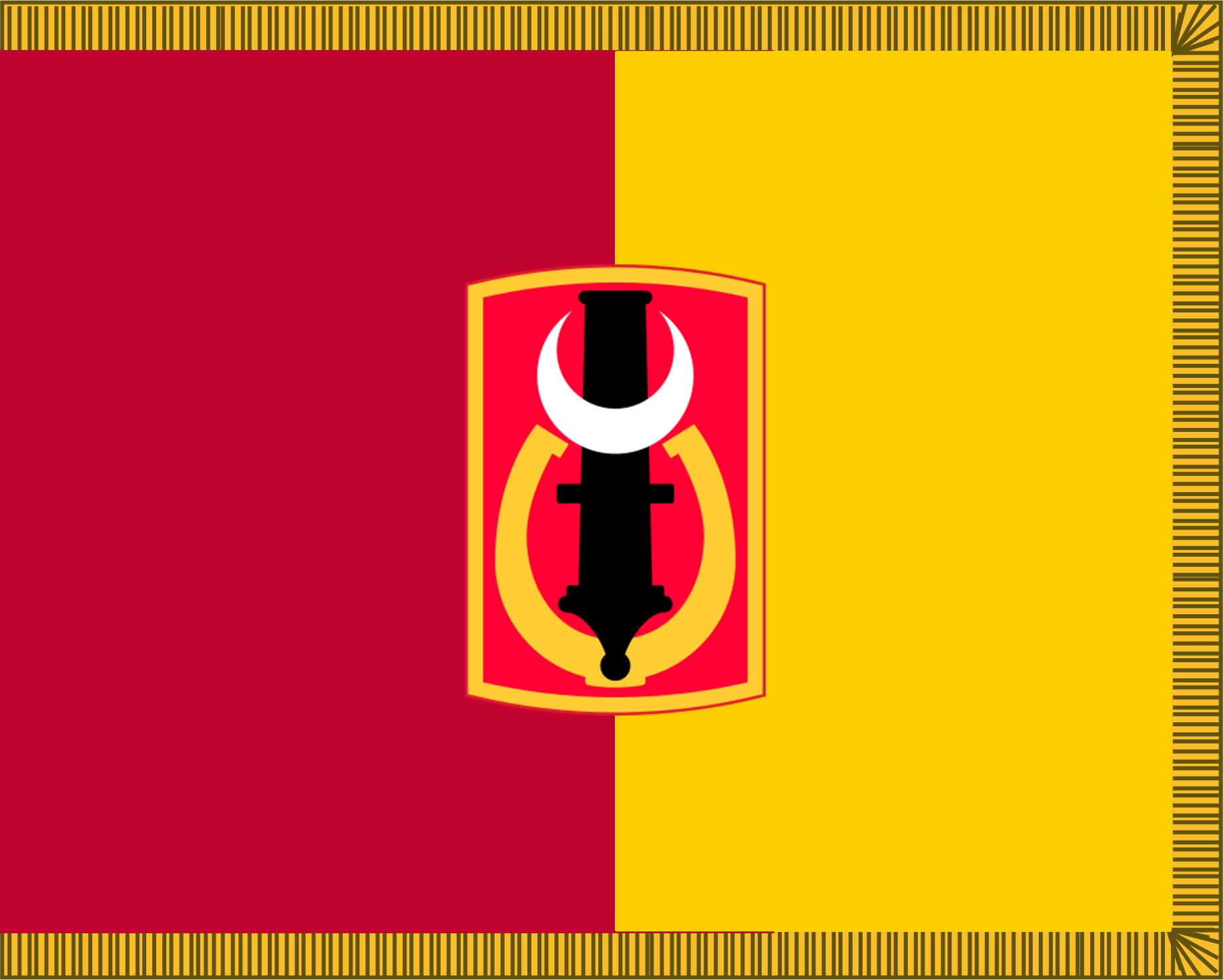
- 151st Field Artillery Brigade Flag

The 151st Field Artillery Brigade was a unit of the South Carolina National Guard until August 2008. The unit's lineage goes back to 1880 when it was organized as the Sumter Light Infantry in the South Carolina Volunteer Militia. By World War I in 1916, the unit was known as L Company, 2nd Infantry Regiment and was federalized from July 1916 to March 1917. The unit was never sent to France, but it became an element of the 30th Infantry Division.

In 1929, it was reorganized as Battery E, 115th Field Artillery Regiment. It was again redesignated Battery C, 178th Field Artillery in 1941. During World War II, the unit participated in six campaigns: Tunisia, Sicily, Naples-Foggia, Rome-Arno, North Apennines and the Po Valley in Africa and Italy. They earned the French Croix de Guerre streamer embroidered CASSINO.

After the war in 1947, the unit was assigned to the 248th Field Artillery Battalion as part of the 51st Infantry Division. In 1959 it became the HHC Battery of the 51st Infantry. In 1963, it was again reorganized as the 151st Artillery Group and finally in 1979 became the 151st Artillery Brigade.

In 2005 subordinate units of the Brigade were called up for Operation Iraqi Freedom. The Brigade was deactivated in August 2008.
