= Calamorhabdium kuekenthali =

Conservation status
- Data Deficient (IUCN 3.1)

Scientific classification
- Kingdom: Animalia
- Phylum: Chordata
- Class: Reptilia
- Order: Squamata
- Suborder: Serpentes
- Family: Colubridae
- Genus: Calamorhabdium
- Species: C. kuekenthali

Binomial name
- Calamorhabdium kuekenthali Boettger, 1898

Species of snake

Calamorhabdium kuekenthali, the Batjan iridescent snake, is a species of snake in the family, Colubridae. It is found in Indonesia.
