= 28th meridian east =

Line of longitude

28th meridian east

The meridian 28° east of Greenwich is a line of longitude that extends from the North Pole across the Arctic Ocean, Europe, Africa, the Indian Ocean, the Southern Ocean, and Antarctica to the South Pole.

The 28th meridian east forms a great circle with the 152nd meridian west.

== From Pole to Pole ==
Starting at the North Pole and heading south to the South Pole, the 28th meridian east passes through:

Co-ordinates	Country, territory or sea	Notes
90°0′N 28°0′E	Arctic Ocean	
80°12′N 28°0′E	Norway	Island of Storøya, Svalbard
80°3′N 28°0′E	Barents Sea	
78°52′N 28°0′E	Norway	Island of Kongsøya, Svalbard
78°50′N 28°0′E	Barents Sea	
71°4′N 28°0′E	Norway	
70°1′N 28°0′E	Finland	
60°40′N 28°0′E	Russia	Leningrad Oblast
60°30′N 28°0′E	Baltic Sea	Gulf of Finland
59°26′N 28°0′E	Estonia	
59°17′N 28°0′E	Russia	Leningrad Oblast; Pskov Oblast — from 59°2′N 28°0′E, passing through Lake Peipus
56°40′N 28°0′E	Latvia	
56°7′N 28°0′E	Belarus	
51°34′N 28°0′E	Ukraine	
48°19′N 28°0′E	Moldova	
47°2′N 28°0′E	Romania	
43°51′N 28°0′E	Bulgaria	
41°13′N 28°0′E	Black Sea	
42°3′N 28°0′E	Bulgaria	For about 8 km
41°59′N 28°0′E	Turkey	109 km Thrace
41°1′N 28°0′E	Sea of Marmara	61 km.
40°30′N 28°0′E	Turkey	385 km. Anatolia
37°2′N 28°0′E	Mediterranean Sea	18 km.Aegean Sea
36°48′N 28°0′E	Turkey	10 km. Datça Peninsula
36°34′N 28°0′E	Mediterranean Sea	43 km Aegean Sea
36°22′N 28°0′E	Greece	Island of Rhodes
36°3′N 28°0′E	Mediterranean Sea	
31°5′N 28°0′E	Egypt	
22°0′N 28°0′E	Sudan	
10°10′N 28°0′E	Abyei	Area controlled by Sudan, and claimed by South Sudan
9°25′N 28°0′E	South Sudan	
4°33′N 28°0′E	Democratic Republic of the Congo	
12°20′S 28°0′E	Zambia	The border with Zimbabwe is in Lake Kariba
16°53′S 28°0′E	Zimbabwe	
21°33′S 28°0′E	Botswana	
22°56′S 28°0′E	South Africa	Limpopo; North West; Gauteng - passing through Johannesburg, west of the city centre Free State
28°52′S 28°0′E	Lesotho	
30°39′S 28°0′E	South Africa	Eastern Cape
32°57′S 28°0′E	Indian Ocean	
60°0′S 28°0′E	Southern Ocean	
69°52′S 28°0′E	Antarctica	Queen Maud Land, claimed by Norway

== See also ==
- 27th meridian east
- 29th meridian east
