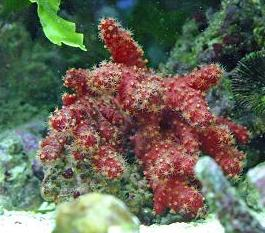
- Nephthyigorgia sp.

Scientific classification
- Kingdom: Animalia
- Phylum: Cnidaria
- Subphylum: Anthozoa
- Class: Octocorallia
- Order: Malacalcyonacea
- Family: Nidaliidae; Gray, 1869

Genera
- See text

= Nidaliidae =

Family of corals

Nidaliidae is a family of soft corals in the phylum Cnidaria. Some members of this family are similar in appearance to gorgonians (sea fans). They are difficult to keep in the reef aquarium because they do not contain symbiotic zooxanthellae and therefore need to be fed on zooplankton. Others, in the genera Agaricoidea, Nidalla and Pieterfaurea, more resemble members of the family Nephtheidae and these are somewhat easier to keep in the aquarium.

== Genera ==
The World Register of Marine Species includes the following genera in the family:

- Agaricoides Simpson, 1905
- Nidalia Gray, 1834
- Nidaliopsis Kükenthal, 1906
- Orlikia Malyutin, 1993

Three other genera were previously placed in this family. Siphonogorgia and Chironephthya are now placed in family Siphonogorgiidae, while Nephthyigorgia is placed in its own monotypic family.
