= 151st Division =

151st Division or 151st Infantry Division may refer to:

- 151st Infantry Division "Perugia", Italy
- 151st Division (Imperial Japanese Army)
- 151st Rifle Division, Soviet Union
- Fictitious United States Army unit featured in the American 1954 film White Christmas

== See also ==
- List of military divisions by number
- 151st Brigade (disambiguation)
- 151st Regiment (disambiguation)
- 151st (disambiguation)
