= Kapp Altmann =

Headland of Kongsøya, Svalbard

Coordinates: 78.8162°N 28.0810°E

Kapp Altmann is a headland at the southern side of Kongsøya in Kong Karls Land, Svalbard. It has a length of 1.9 kilometers and a width between 100 and 200 meters. Outside the spit are two small islands. The headland is named after Arctic explorer Johan Andreas Altmann. Kapp Altmann defines the western extension of the bay Breibukta.
