= 152nd meridian west =

Line of longitude

152nd meridian west

The meridian 152° west of Greenwich is a line of longitude that extends from the North Pole across the Arctic Ocean, North America, the Pacific Ocean, the Southern Ocean, and Antarctica to the South Pole.

The 152nd meridian west forms a great circle with the 28th meridian east.

== From Pole to Pole ==
Starting at the North Pole and heading south to the South Pole, the 152nd meridian west passes through:

Co-ordinates	Country, territory or sea	Notes
90°0′N 152°0′W	Arctic Ocean	
72°3′N 152°0′W	Beaufort Sea	
70°34′N 152°0′W	United States	Alaska
60°41′N 152°0′W	Cook Inlet	
60°25′N 152°0′W	United States	Alaska — Kalgin Island
60°21′N 152°0′W	Cook Inlet	Passing just west of the Kenai Peninsula, Alaska, United States (at 59°18′N 151°59′W)
58°55′N 152°0′W	United States	Alaska — the Barren Islands
58°54′N 152°0′W	Pacific Ocean	
58°21′N 152°0′W	United States	Alaska — Afognak Island
58°12′N 152°0′W	Pacific Ocean	Passing just east of Kodiak Island, Alaska, United States (at 57°37′N 152°9′W); Passing just west of Flint Island, Kiribati (at 11°25′S 151°48′W); Passing just west of Tupai atoll, French Polynesia (at 16°14′S 151°51′W); Passing just east of Maupiti atoll, French Polynesia (at 16°26′S 152°13′W); Passing just west of Bora Bora island, French Polynesia (at 16°28′S 151°47′W)
60°0′S 152°0′W	Southern Ocean	
77°20′S 152°0′W	Antarctica	Ross Dependency, claimed by New Zealand

== See also ==
- 151st meridian west
- 153rd meridian west
