= Retziusfjellet =

Mountain in Svalbard, Norway

Coordinates: 78.8915°N 28.1231°E

Retziusfjellet is a mountain on Kongsøya in Kong Karls Land, Svalbard. It is named after Swedish physician Gustaf Retzius. The mountain reaches a height of 320 meters, and is the highest point of Kongsøya. It is located south of Hårfagrehaugen (304 m.a.s.l.), and northwest of Tordenskjoldberget.
