= 151st meridian west =

Line of longitude

151st meridian west (interactive map)

The meridian 151° west of Greenwich is a line of longitude that extends from the North Pole across the Arctic Ocean, North America, the Pacific Ocean, the Southern Ocean, and Antarctica to the South Pole.

The 151st meridian west forms a great ellipse with the 29th meridian east.

== From Pole to Pole ==
Starting at the North Pole and heading south to the South Pole, the 151st meridian west passes through:

Co-ordinates	Country, territory or sea	Notes
90°0′N 151°0′W	Arctic Ocean	
72°11′N 151°0′W	Beaufort Sea	
70°24′N 151°0′W	United States	Alaska
61°11′N 151°0′W	Cook Inlet	
60°49′N 151°0′W	United States	Alaska — Kenai Peninsula
59°12′N 151°0′W	Pacific Ocean	
23°22′S 151°0′W	French Polynesia	Huahine island
23°24′S 151°0′W	Pacific Ocean	
60°0′S 151°0′W	Southern Ocean	
76°58′S 151°0′W	Antarctica	Ross Dependency, claimed by New Zealand

== See also ==
- 150th meridian west
- 152nd meridian west
