= 150th meridian west =

Line of longitude

150th meridian west

The meridian 150° west of Greenwich is a line of longitude that extends from the North Pole across the Arctic Ocean, North America (entirely within the State of Alaska), the Pacific Ocean, the Southern Ocean, and Antarctica to the South Pole.

In Antarctica, the meridian defines the eastern limit of New Zealand's territorial claim. The land further east is not claimed by any nation except the micronation of Westarctica, which is not recognized by any UN member state.

The 150th meridian west forms a great ellipse with the 30th meridian east.

The Hawaii–Aleutian Time Zone and Line Islands Time Zone is based on the mean solar time of this meridian.

== From Pole to Pole ==
Starting at the North Pole and heading south to the South Pole, the 150th meridian west passes through:

Co-ordinates	Country, territory or sea	Notes
90°0′N 150°0′W	Arctic Ocean	
72°20′N 150°0′W	Beaufort Sea	
70°28′N 150°0′W	United States	Alaska - passing through Anchorage (at 61°12′N 150°0′W)
59°39′N 150°0′W	Pacific Ocean	Passing just east of Caroline Island, Kiribati (at 9°56′S 150°12′W); Passing just west of Moorea island, French Polynesia (at 17°30′S 149°55′W)
60°0′S 150°0′W	Southern Ocean	
76°32′S 150°0′W	Antarctica	Border between Ross Dependency, claimed by New Zealand, and unclaimed territory

== See also ==
- 149th meridian west
- 151st meridian west
