= August Brauer =

German zoologist

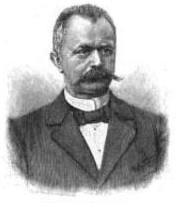
- Born: 3 April 1863; Oldenburg, Grand Duchy of Oldenburg
- Died: 10 September 1917 (aged 54); Berlin, German Empire
- Scientific career
- Fields: Zoology

August Bernhard Brauer (3 April 1863 – 10 September 1917) was a German zoologist.

Brauer was born in Oldenburg. He studied natural sciences at the Universities of Bonn, Berlin and Freiburg, obtaining his doctorate in 1895 with a thesis on the ciliate- Bursaria truncatella titled Bursaria truncatella unter Berücksichtigung anderer Heterotrichen und der Vorticellinen. In 1892 he received his habilitation at the University of Marburg, where he subsequently worked as a lecturer. In 1894–95 he conducted scientific studies in the Seychelles.

Along with other scientists, he participated in the "1898–99 German Deep-Sea Expedition" aboard the steamer Valdivia under the leadership of Carl Chun (1852–1914). In 1906 he was named director of the Berlin Zoological Museum (nowadays Berlin's Natural History Museum), and later in his career he attained the title of "full professor".

Brauer distinguished himself in the field of deep-sea ichthyology, based largely on his experiences from the 1898–99 "Valdivia Expedition" as well as in his subsequent analyses of species collected on the journey. He was the first to demonstrate that ceratioids were mesopelagic and bathypelagic lifeforms rather than bottom-dwelling organisms. He described four ceratioid species new to science, recognizing an overall total of 23 species in three families; Ceratiidae, Gigantactinidae and Aceratiidae. He made important scientific contributions towards the multi-volume project- Wissenschaftliche Ergebnisse der Deutschen Tiefsee-Expedition auf dem Dampfer "Valdivia" 1898–1899 (Scientific results of the German deep-sea expedition on the steamer "Valdivia" 1898–1899).

He was the author of Die Süßwasserfauna Deutschlands, a work on freshwater fauna of Germany that was published in nineteen parts from 1909 to 1912. Also, he was an editor of Fauna arctica, a project on Arctic fauna that was originally begun by Fritz Römer (1866–1909) and Fritz Schaudinn (1871–1906).

In 1896 herpetologist Oskar Boettger (1844–1910) named the lizard species Janetaescincus braueri (Brauer's burrowing skink) in his honour.

He died in Berlin.

== Sources ==
- Biographical information is based on a translation from an equivalent article at the German Wikipedia.

== See also ==
- Category:Taxa named by August Brauer
