= Nordaustpynten =

Headland of Kongsøya, Svalbard

Coordinates: 78.9148°N 29.6224°E

Nordaustpynten is a headland at Kongsøya of the Kong Karls Land, Svalbard, the most northeastern point of the island.
