= Willy Kükenthal =

German zoologist (1861–1922)

Wilhelm Georg Kükenthal
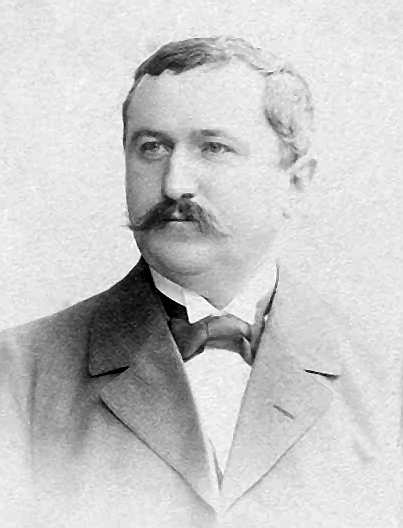
- Born: 4 August 1861; Weißenfels, Prussia
- Died: 20 August 1922 (aged 61); Berlin, Germany
- Education: Ludwig-Maximilians-Universität München; University of Jena
- Scientific career
- Fields: Zoology

Wilhelm (Willy) Georg Kükenthal (4 August 1861 – 20 August 1922) was a German zoologist. He was the older brother of botanist and theologian Georg Kükenthal (1864–1955). Kükenthal specialized in the Octocorallia and in marine mammals. He edited, along with Thilo Krumbach, a landmark series of eight volumes in the Handbuch der Zoologie series which extensively reviewed and compiled the state of zoological knowledge of the time.

== Life ==
Kükenthal was born to August Kükenthal (1826-1910) and Minna Wimmer (died 1917) and went to school at Weißenfels and Halle before joining the Ludwig-Maximilians-Universität München where he studied mineralogy and later zoology at the University of Jena, earning his doctorate at the latter institution in 1884 for studying lymphoid cells in annelids. He travelled around the North Sea with B. Weißenborn and joined the zoology department Jena under Ernst Haeckel in 1885. He was also influenced by Karl August Möbius. In 1886, with support from the Senckenberg Natural History Society, he participated in an expedition to Borneo and the Moluccas. He specialized in the study of Octocorallia, a taxonomic subclass that includes sea pens, sea fans and soft corals. In 1887, he obtained his habilitation, becoming a professor of phylogeny at Jena two years later. From 1898 he served as professor of comparative anatomy and zoology at the University of Breslau (Wrocław) and as director of the zoological museum which in the present day is the Museum of Natural History, University of Wrocław ("Muzeum Przyrodnicze Uniwersytetu Wrocławskiego" in Polish). In 1918, he was appointed professor of zoology at the University of Berlin as well as director of the zoological museum. From 1918 to 1919, he was president of the German Zoological Society.

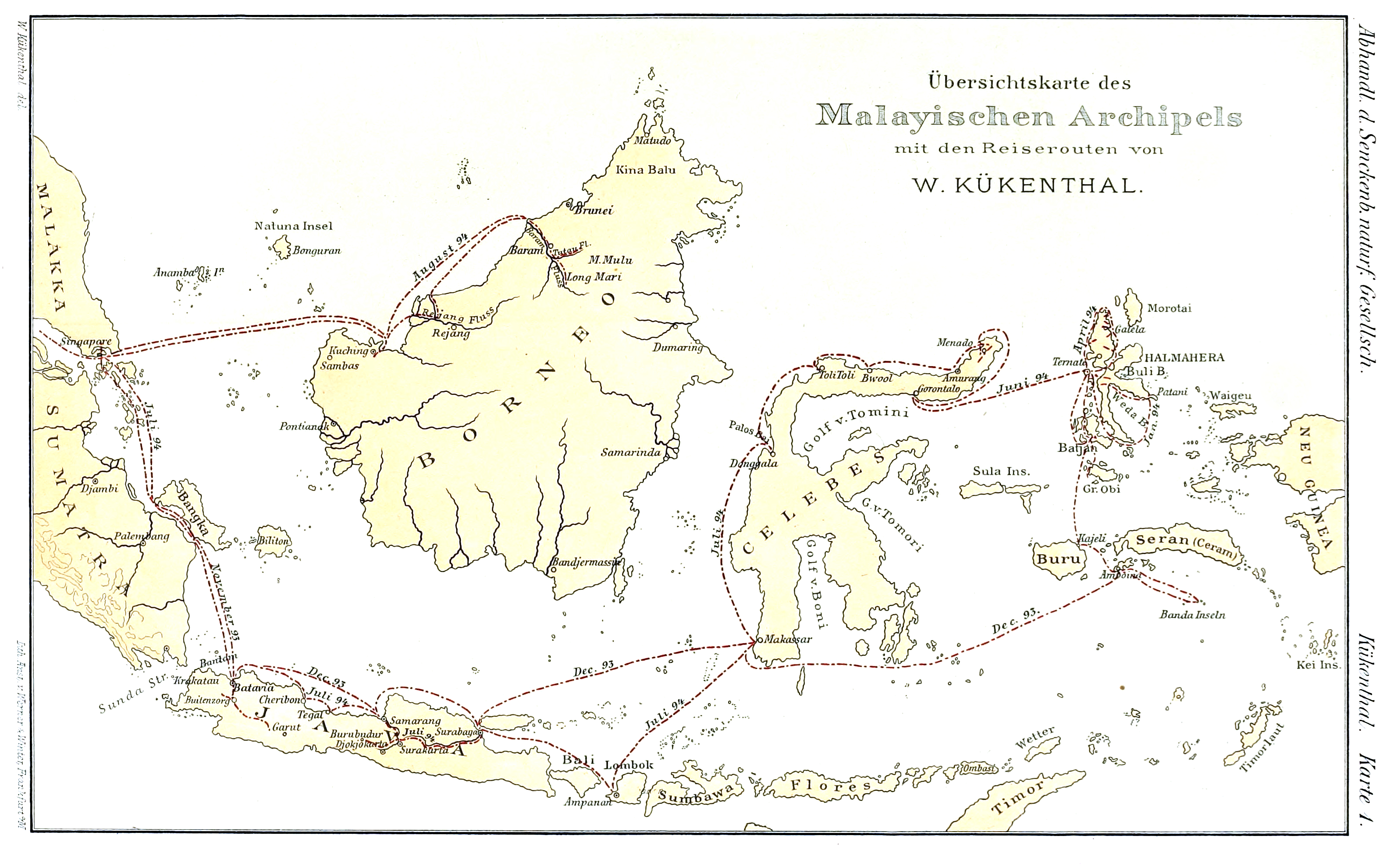
Route taken in the 1896 expedition.

Kükenthal traveled to regions in the Arctic in 1886, aboard the vessel Germania. He also joined the Valdivia expedition in 1889 and travelled again to the Moluccas and Borneo in 1893-94. He also conducted ethnographic studies. His large collection of zoological specimens is now housed at the Senckenberg Museum in Frankfurt.

Kükenthal was principally interested in comparative anatomy and conducted embryological and comparative anatomical investigations of whales and other marine mammals. He was a supporter of Haeckel's biogenetic law. His other area of interest was the systematics of coelenterates and cnidarians. He published the Leitfaden für das Zoologische Praktikum (1898) and from 1913 he edited along with Thilo Krumbach the Handbuch der Zoologie. Numerous copies of the Handbuch were burned by the Nazis as it was published by Dr W. Junk publishers (and Wilhelm Junk was a Jew).

He has over twenty zoological species named after him, including Calamorhabdium kuekenthali (Batjan iridescent snake), Emoia kuekenthali (Kuekenthal's emo skink), Hemirhamphodon kuekenthali (Kuekenthal's halfbeak), Parantica kuekenthali (Kuekenthal's yellow tiger), and Lysmata kuekenthali (Kuekenthal's cleaner shrimp).

Kükenthaløya, a small island located between Spitsbergen and Barentsøya is named in his honor.

== Selected publications (in German) ==
- Vergleichend-anatomische und entwickelungsgeschichtliche Untersuchungen an Walthieren. (1889).
- Forschungsreise in den Molukken und in Borneo : im Auftrage der Senckenbergischen naturforschenden Gesellschaft [=Expedition to the Moluccas and Borneo, on behalf of the Senckenberg Natural History Society]. (1896).
- Leitfaden für das Zoologische Praktikum [=Manual of practical zoology]. (1898).
- Australien, Ozeanien und Polarländer [=Australia, Oceania and Polar Lands]. (1902, 1910; with Wilhelm Sievers in Sievers’ Allgemeinen Länderkunde).
- Pennatularia (1915).
- Gorgonaria (1919).
