= Abel Island =

Island in Norway

Native name: Abeløya
- Location within Svalbard

Geography
- Coordinates: 78°59′20″N 30°12′20″E
- Area: 13 km^{2} (5.0 sq mi)

Administration
- Norway

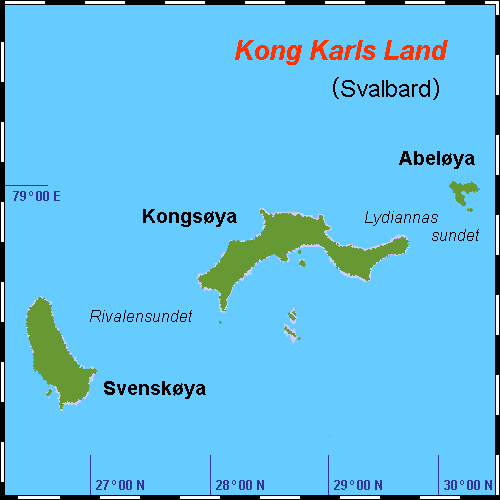
Abel Island located on the map amongst its neighboring islands

Abel Island (Norwegian: Abeløya) is an island in Svalbard. It is the third-largest island of Kong Karls Land with an area of 13 km^{2} (5.0 sq mi). It is named after the Norwegian mathematician Niels Henrik Abel. Abel Island is separated from Kongsøya by the strait Lydiannasundet.
