= Svenskøya =

Island in Norway

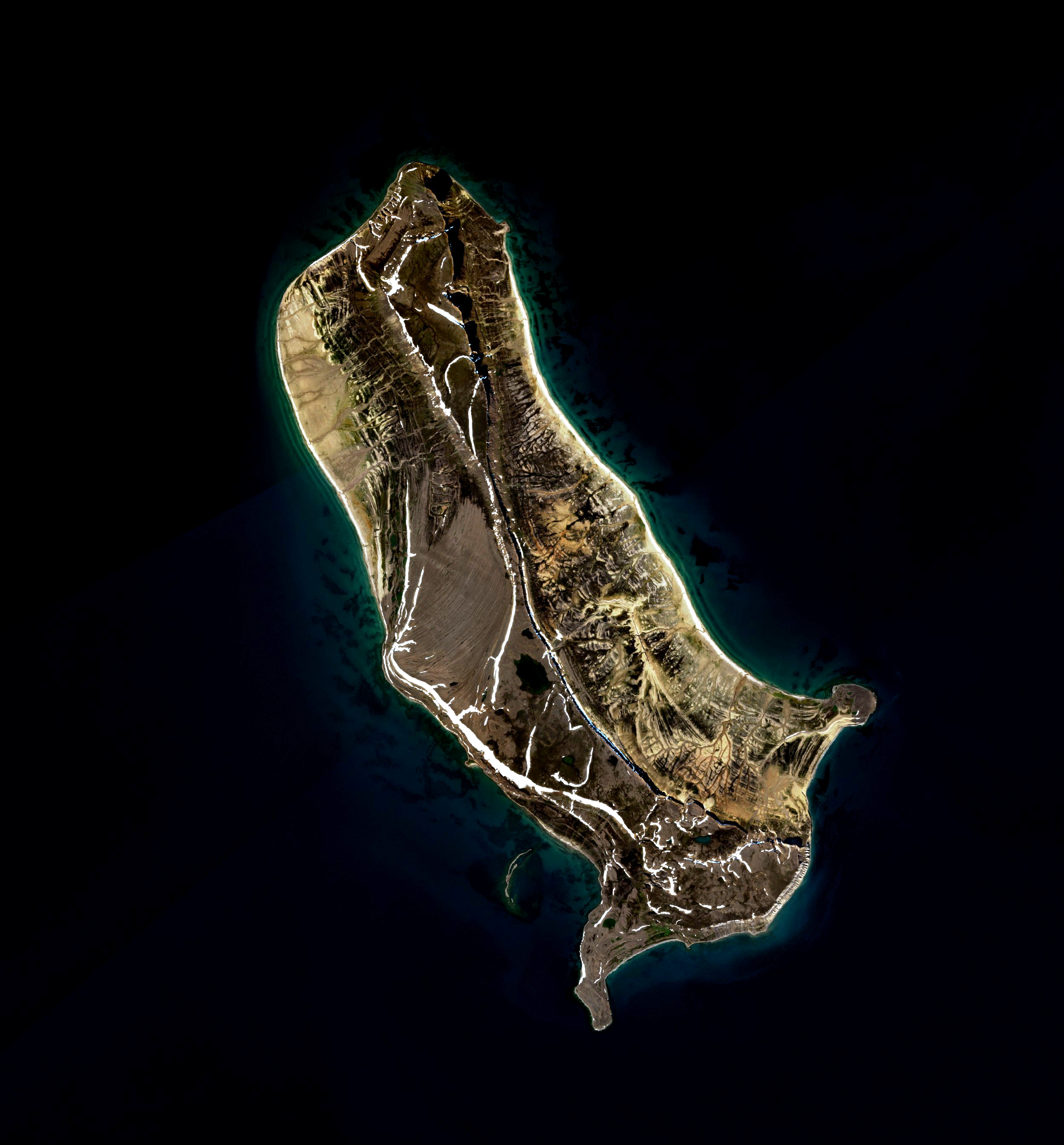
- Sentinel-2 image (2021)
- Interactive map of Svenskøya

Geography
- Location: Arctic Ocean
- Coordinates: 78°43′N 26°38′E
- Archipelago: Svalbard
- Area: 137 km^{2} (53 sq mi)
- Highest elevation: 288 m (945 ft)
- Highest point: Mohnhøgda

Administration
- Norway

Demographics
- Population: 0

Svenskøya (English: "Swedish Island") is an island in Svalbard. It is the second largest island of Kong Karls Land with an area of 137 km².

Svenskøya is separated from Kongsøya by the strait Rivalensundet. The island is separated from Edgeøya and Barentsøya by the strait Olgastretet.

== See also ==
- List of islands of Norway
