= Kongsøya =

Island of Svalbard

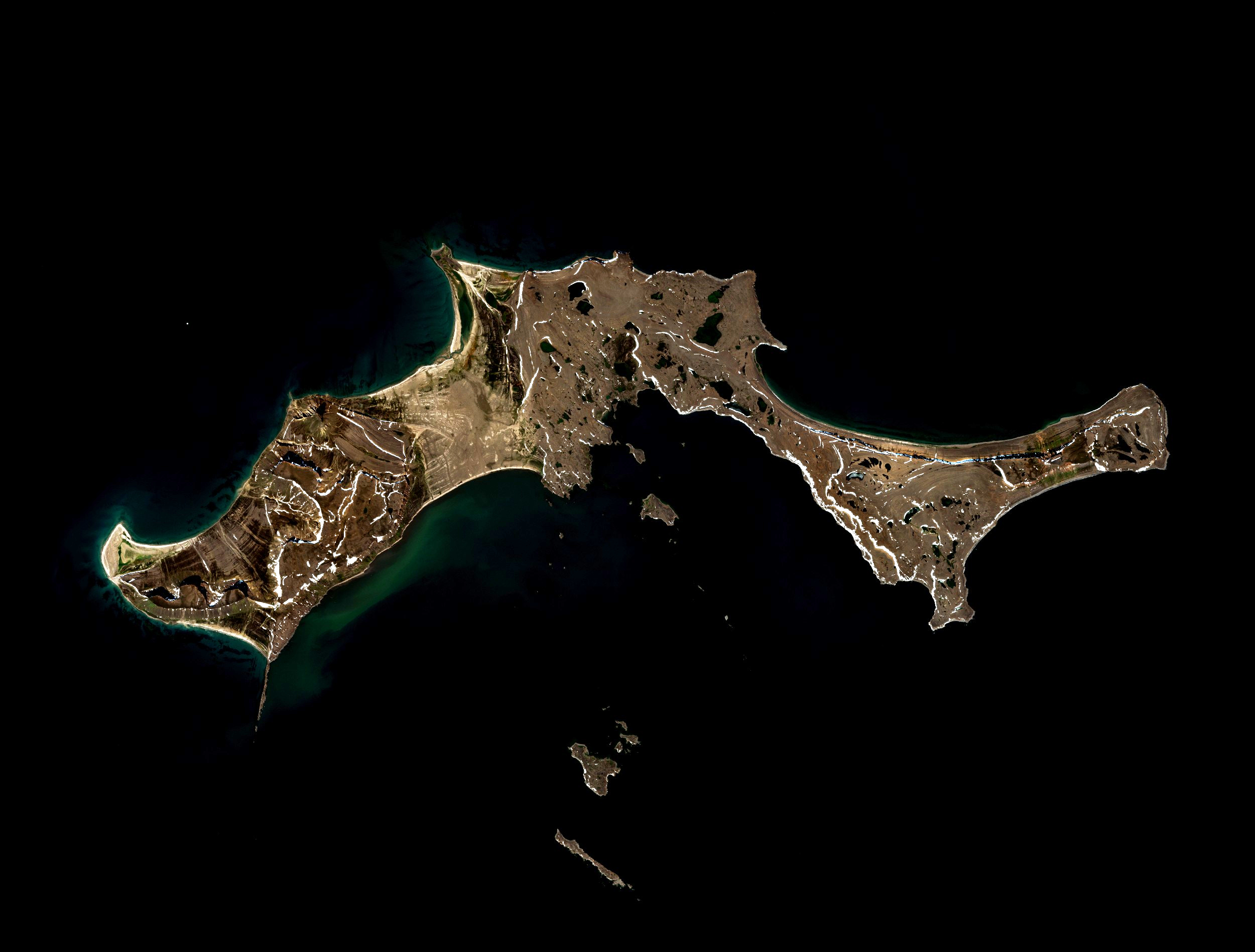
- Sentinel-2 image (2021)
- Interactive map of Kongsøya

Geography
- Location: Arctic Ocean
- Coordinates: 78°56′N 28°35′E
- Archipelago: Svalbard
- Area: 191 km^{2} (74 sq mi)

Administration
- Norway

Demographics
- Population: 0

Kongsøya is an island in Svalbard, Norway. It is the largest of the islands in King Charles Land (Kong Karls Land). Its area is 191 square kilometres (74 sq mi). The other main island in the chain is Svenskøya.

== Geography ==
Kongsøya is the largest island in Kong Karls Land, and has a length of about 40 kilometers. It is separated from Abel Island to the east-northeast by the seven-nautical-mile-wide (thirteen-kilometre) strait Lydiannasundet, and from Svenskøya to the west-southwest by Rivalensundet (15 nmi or 28 km wide). The strait of Erik Eriksenstretet separates Kongsøya from Nordaustlandet.

Kongsøya has a long, narrow and bent shape, with a number of headlands and bays. At the southern side of Kongsøya is the wide open bay Breibukta, with several islets and skerries. The islands of Helgoland Island and Tirpitzøya are located south of Breibukta. Further east, between Tømmerneset and Bremodden, is the bay Andréebukta, and on the northern side is Svenskebukta. Further east is the bay Bünsowbukta, between the headlands of Nordneset and Kapp Koburg. The bay of Vrakbukta, between Kapp Koburg and Kennedyneset, faces northwest. To the south is the bay Antarcticbukta and the headland Kapp Altmann. At the southern side of the island, northeast of Kapp Altmann, is the long beach Snøsporvstranda.

The western and eastern parts of Kongsøya are highlands, while the central part consists of lower land. The highest mountain is Retziusfjellet at the western side of the island, with an altitude of 320 m.a.s.l. Johnsenberget, at the eastern part of the island, reaches the height of 235 meters. The interior of the eastern side contains the plain Rundisflya, named by the circular glaciated area Rundisen. Rundisflya has a height of 50 m.a.s.l. or higher. It contains several smaller lakes, the largest of which is Rundisdammen. Five smaller lakes, Koppelvatna, are located east of Johnsenberget.

== History ==
Kong Karls Land was possibly observed by whaler Thomas Edge in 1617. It was rediscovered in 1853, reported by Erik Eriksen. Hunters killed about 100 polar bears during the winter of 1908–1909. Cabins were built at Nordaustpynten, Kapp Koburg and Tømmerneset. In 1971 the polar bear was fully protected from hunting. In 1985 the whole Kong Karls Land, including Kongsøya, was totally protected against human traffic.

== Nature ==
Kong Karls Land is regarded the most important hibernating area for polar bears in Svalbard. A density of 14 dens per square kilometer has been observed at Kongsøya. Kongsøya is included in the Nordaust-Svalbard Nature Reserve, which was established in 1973. In 1985 strong regulations of human traffic on the island were introduced. The purpose is to avoid disturbance of the polar bear at its most important denning locations. It is generally forbidden to visit any of the islands of Kong Karls Land. This also includes the sea area within a distance of 500 meters from the shore, and air traffic lower than 500 meters. Exceptions from the prohibition are supervision activities from the authorities, and to a certain extent scientific exploration or other special purposes, if this does not violate the purpose of the regulations.

== See also ==
- List of islands of Norway
