= Kong Karls Land =

Island group in Norway

King Charles Land
Native name: Kong Karls Land
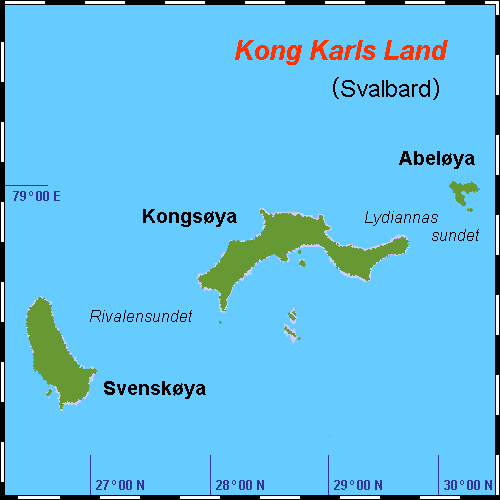
- Map of Kong Karls Land
- Interactive map of King Charles Land

Geography
- Location: Northern Europe
- Coordinates: 78°45′N 28°30′E
- Archipelago: Svalbard
- Total islands: 5
- Major islands: Kongsøya, Svenskøya, Abel Island, Helgoland Island, and Tirpitzøya
- Area: 342 km^{2} (132 sq mi)

Administration
- Norway

Demographics
- Population: 0

Kong Karls Land or King Charles Land is an island group in the Svalbard archipelago, in the Arctic Ocean. The island group covers an area of 342 km^{2} (132 sq mi) and is made up of the islands of Kongsøya, Svenskøya, Abel Island, Helgoland Island, and Tirpitzøya. The island group was discovered in the 1870s and first accurately mapped by Kapitän Rüdiger in 1898.

== History ==
Kong Karls Land was first sighted in 1872, and was visited by multiple Norwegian captains. The first scientific expedition to the island group was by the Bremen Geographical Society in 1889. Kapitän Rüdiger, captain of the Helgoland, produced the first accurate map of Kong Karls Land in 1898. A.G. Nathorst, a member of a Swedish expedition in 1898, also mapped the area, but left the coast of Abel Island as a dotted line.

== Geography ==
The islands of Kong Karls Land were formed from the late Triassic to early Cretaceous periods. Kongsøya (191 square kilometers (74 sq mi)) and Svenskøya (136 square kilometers (53 sq mi)) are the two largest islands in the island group.

== Ecology ==
Polar bears are found during portions of the year at Kong Karls Land; they feed on local harp seals and ring seals. The sub-population of polar bears found here is a genetically distinct set of polar bears specifically associated with the Barents Sea region.

A total of 84 polar bears were killed and 21 cubs were captured during an expedition in Kong Karls Land from 1908 to 1909. The number of polar bear dens on these islands rose from 29 in 1972 to 77 in 1980. In 1973, the hunting of polar bears in Svalbard was made illegal.

== See also ==
- List of islands in the Arctic Ocean

== Works cited ==
- Barr, William (1988). "The Helgoland Expedition to Svalbard: Die Deutsche Expedition in das Nördliche Eismeer, 1898". Arctic. 41 (3). Arctic Institute of North America: 203–214. doi:10.2307/40510716. JSTOR 40510716.
- Larsen, Thor (1985). "Polar Bear Denning and Cub Production in Svalbard, Norway". Journal of Wildlife Management. 49 (2). Wiley: 320–326. doi:10.2307/3801524. JSTOR 3801524.
- Salvigsen, Otto (1981). "Radiocarbon Dated Raised Beaches in Kong Karls Land, Svalbard, and Their Consequences for the Glacial History of the Barents Sea Area". Geografiska Annaler. 63 (3). Swedish Society for Anthropology and Geography: 283–291. doi:10.2307/520841. JSTOR 520841.
