= Duho Formation =

Middle Miocene geologic formation in South Korea

- Stratigraphic range: Mid-Miocene; ~15–12 Ma
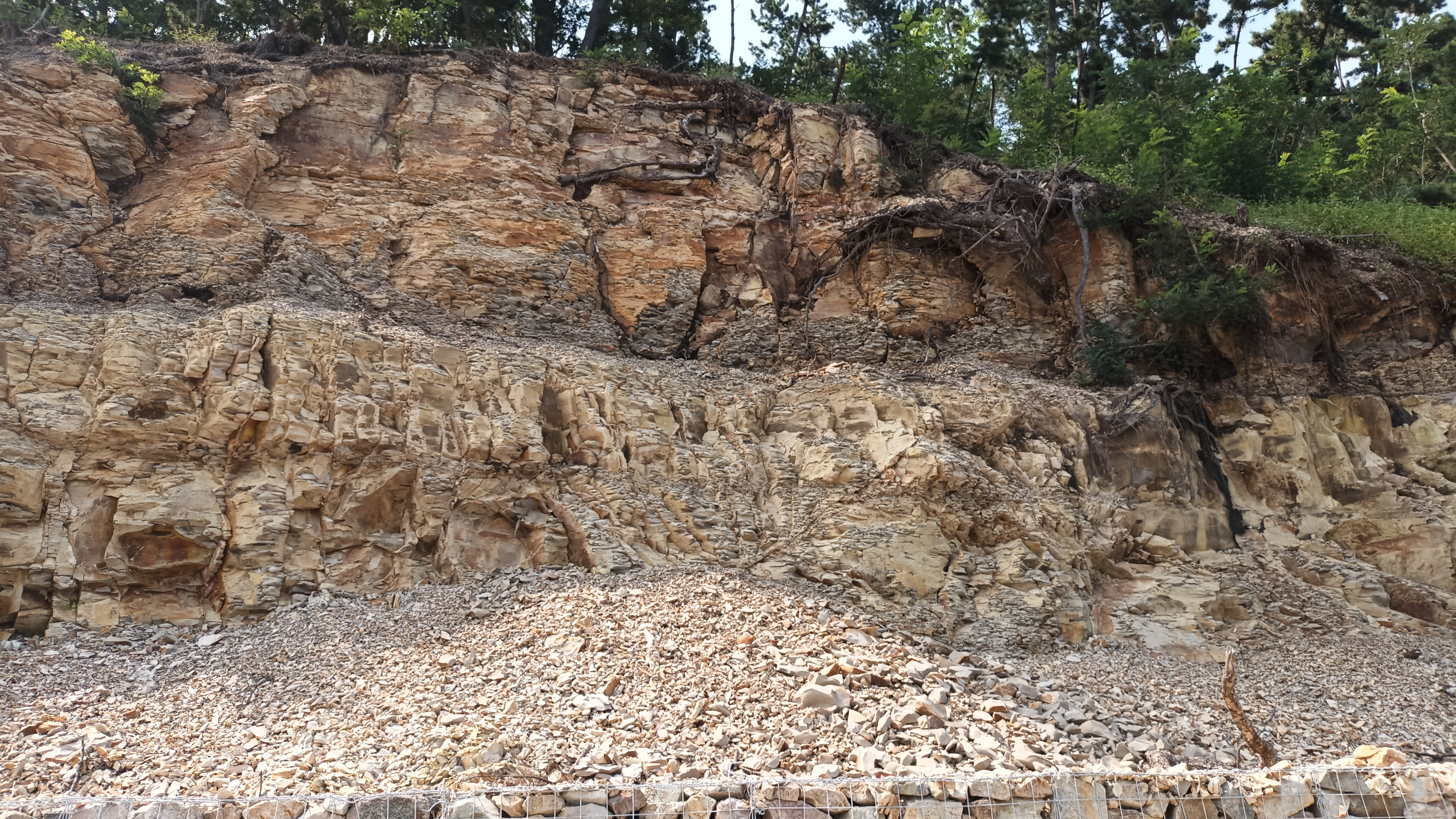
- Type: Geological formation
- Unit of: Yeonil Group
- Underlies: Alluvium
- Overlies: Hagjeon Formation
- Thickness: 150–250 m (490–820 ft)

Lithology
- Primary: Mudstone
- Other: Sandstone, Shale

Location
- Coordinates: 36.0°N 129.2°E
- Region: North Gyeongsang Province
- Country: South Korea
- Extent: Pohang Basin (ko:포항 분지)

Type section
- Named for: Duho-dong, Pohang
- Named by: Um, Lee and Bak 1964
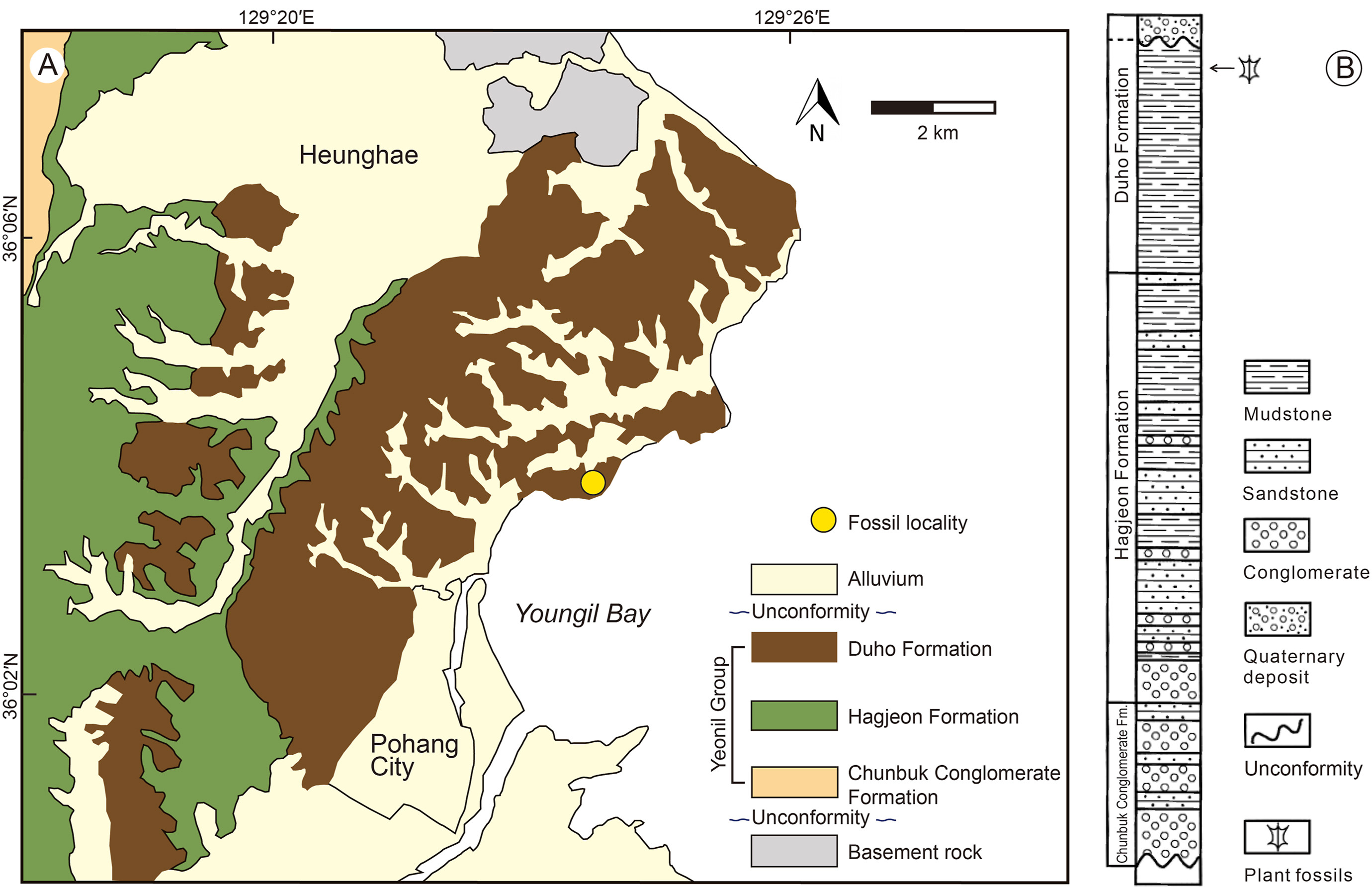
- Geological map and stratigraphy of the Pohang Basin

The Duho Formation (Korean: 두호층; Hanja: 斗湖層; RR: Duho-cheung) is a middle Miocene geological formation in Pohang, South Korea. This formation is deposited in a deep marine environment and is roughly dated to around 15 to 12 million years ago based on various analyses. It is the uppermost unit of the Yeonil Group of Pohang Basin and mainly composed of yellow-brown to dark gray mudstones.

== Geology ==
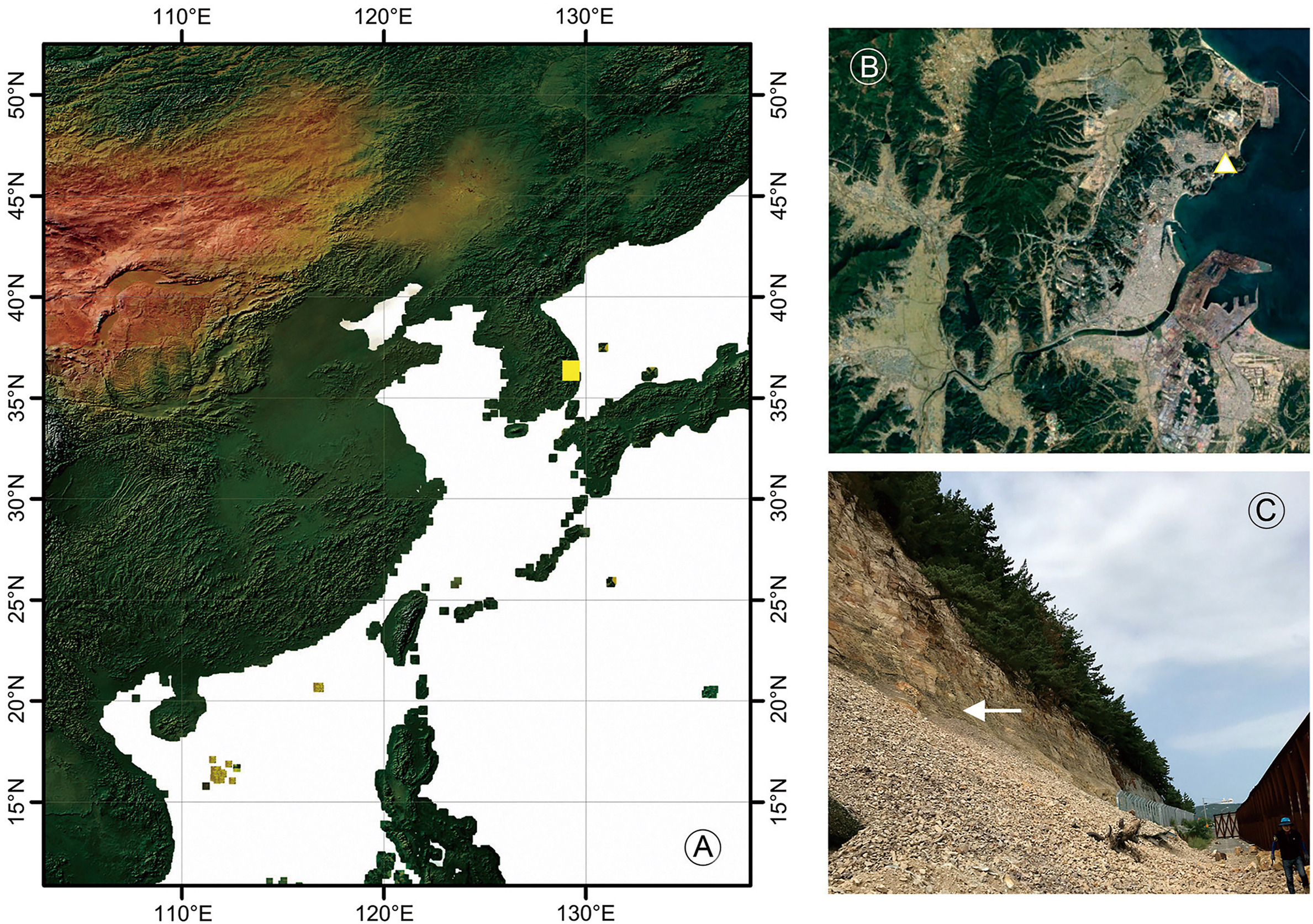
Fossil locality in the Pohang Basin

The deposition of the Pohang Basin began some time after 21.89 to 21.68 million years ago, corresponding to the Early Miocene, based on zircon U-Pb dating. This deep-marine basin was probably produced by rapid subsidence around 17 million years ago, following the abrupt ending of the strike-slip deformation and volcanic activity, and experienced tectonic inactivity for 5 to 7 million years until the crustal uplift in southeastern Korea around 10 million years ago which caused the sedimentation to cease. The basin was likely a pelagic zone around 17.6 to 11.5 million years ago based on biostratigraphy analysis.

The intrusive basalt of the Yeonil Group from the southern part of the basin is dated to the lower Middle Miocene around 15.16 to 14.82 million years ago based on K-Ar dating, which implies the evolution of back-arc basin in the seas of southeastern Korea, followed by the tectonic inversion which changed the geodynamic setting and basaltic magma composition. Paleomagnetic dating (analysis of the sediments' ancient magnetic fields) of the Duho Formation yielded the age estimate ranging from 14.7 to 11.6 million years ago. The age estimate of the Yeonil Group based on the same technique is around 17.3 to 11.3 million years ago for the lower and upper part respectively with a reliable pole position of 15 million years ago, while biostratigraphy analysis indicated that the age of the Duho Formation likely ranged from 14 to 12 million years ago. It is probably not younger than 11.95 million years ago based on the radiolarians recovered from the formation.

== Paleoecology ==
Notable fossils from the Duho Formation include a variety of aquatic invertebrates such as ophiuroids, bivalves and mantis shrimps, numerous extant genera of plants, indeterminate remains of toothed whales with some diagnostic to the genus level, and diverse ichthyofauna ranging from small bony fish to large cartilaginous fish like the giant lamniform shark Otodus megalodon which would have been the apex predator of the Miocene seas of Korea. While the fauna consists of species ranging from the shallow coastal waters (neritic and epipelagic zone) to the depths of over 1,000 metres (3,300 ft) (bathypelagic zone), the sediments were probably deposited in a pelagic deep-water setting as evidenced by the paleoecological and bathymetric features of the fossil assemblage.

== Fossil content ==
=== Crustaceans ===
Crustaceans of the Duho Formation
Genus	Species	Region	Member	Material	Notes	Image
Leesquilla	L. bajee; L. sunii				Mantis shrimp belonging to the family Squillidae	
Pohsquilla	P. neonica; P. scissodentica				Mantis shrimp belonging to the family Squillidae	
Squilla	S. sp.				Mantis shrimp belonging to the family Squillidae	

=== Insects ===
The probable ant fossil named as Aphaenogaster "koreana" in a 2018 conference abstracts is a nomen nudum.

Insects of the Duho Formation
Genus	Species	Region	Member	Material	Notes	Image
Scarites	S. sp.			A single individual known with part and counterpart	First officially described terrestrial animal (ground beetle) from the deep marine Duho Formation	

=== Echinoderms ===
Echinoderms of the Duho Formation
Genus	Species	Region	Member	Material	Notes	Image
Ophiura	O. pohangensis				Brittle star fossils previously described from the same formation are probably conspecific with O. pohangensis	
Brissopsis	B. pohangensis				Sea urchin	

=== Molluscs ===
Molluscs of the Duho Formation
Genus	Species	Region	Member	Material	Notes	Image
Acharax	A. tokunagai					
Conchocele	C. bisecta					
Delectopecten	D. peckhami					
Fissidentalium	F. sp.					
Lucinoma	L. acutilineatum; L. sp.					
Macoma	M. incongrua					
Mizuhopecten	M. kimurai ugoensis				Reported as Patinopecten kimurai ugoensis, but this species was already moved to a different genus Mizuhopecten by Mausda (1963)	
Nuculana	N. pennula					
Panomya	P. simotomensis					
Patinopecten	P. sp.					
Phos	P. cf. minoensis					
Portlandia	P. cf. gratiosa					
Propeamussium	P. tateiwai					
Squiresica	S. yooni				Vesicomyid bivalve mollusc fossil originally assigned to as Calyptogena cf. elongata	
Yoldia	Y. sagittaria					

=== Mammals ===
Mammals of the Duho Formation
Genus	Species	Region	Member	Material	Notes	Image
Kentriodontidae	Indeterminate			Partial maxilla (DWFM 10001)	Extinct family of toothed whales	
Pomatodelphininae	Indeterminate			Partial rostrum and mandible (KIGAM VP 201101)	River dolphin found in marine deposits and related to Pomatodelphis	
Tursiops	T. sp.			Partial skeleton measuring 70 cm (2.3 ft) long, with a nearly complete skull	Only described in thesis, not officially published. Resembles the modern bottlenose dolphin with the estimated complete length of the specimen around 1.5–2 m (4.9–6.6 ft)	
Kogia	K. sp.			Partial skull measuring 40 cm (1.3 ft) long, associated with the tooth of an adult tiger shark	Only described in thesis, not officially published. Resembles the modern pygmy sperm whale and dwarf sperm whale	

=== Bony fish ===
Bony fish of the Duho Formation
Genus	Species	Region	Member	Material	Notes	Image
Auxis	A. koreanus; A. sp.			Two fragmentary, disarticulated specimens distinguished from the extant species by the osteological differences in the skull; Partial caudal vertebrae (GNUE322001) associated with a leaf imprint	First and second fossil record of the genus Auxis in Korea	Auxis sp. (GNUE322001)
Cyclothone	C. duhoensis			Single complete specimen	The oldest nominal species of Cyclothone	
Pleuronectiformes	Indeterminate			4 individuals	First record of flatfish from this formation, at least 2 individuals might be distinct from Pleuronichthys	
Pleuronichthys	P. sp.			2 individuals, both juvenile	Species unknown, due to both specimens being juvenile	
Stenobrachius	S. sangsunii			20 specimens	Lanternfish	
Vinciguerria	V. orientalis			61 specimens, from articulated to disarticulated skeletons	Distinct from modern species of Vinciguerria in terms of caudal skeleton structure	Holotype of V. orientalis
Zaprora	Z. koreana			Single specimen in part and counterpart, representing the caudal body region	Second fossil record of the family Zaproridae	

=== Cartilaginous fish ===
The record of Otodus obliquus from this formation is most likely a misidentification of other otodontid or lamniform shark.

Cartilaginous fish of the Duho Formation
Genus	Species	Region	Member	Material	Notes	Image
Carcharhinus	C. aff. C. plumbeus; C. aff. C. amblyrhynchos; C. aff. C. altimus			Teeth		
Cetorhinus	C. huddlestoni			Gill rakers and oral tooth mold		
Cosmopolitodus	C. hastalis; C. planus			Teeth	Uncertain whether it is a distinct genus or a junior synonym of Carcharodon	
Dalatias	D. orientalis			Teeth	Two teeth originally assigned to as D. licha (CNUNHM-F279) and D. cf. licha (CNUNHM-F392) respectively are now the paratypes of D. orientalis	
Galeocerdo	G. aduncus			Teeth		
Hexanchus	H. griseus			Tooth	Miocene record of the modern bluntnose sixgill shark	Modern bluntnose sixgill shark in Santa Rosa Reef
Isurus	I. sp. 1; I. sp. 2			Teeth		
Mitsukurina	M. owstoni			Teeth	Among the oldest known record of the modern goblin shark; one tooth (CNUNHM-F268) was originally assigned to as M. cf. lineata	Juvenile of a modern goblin shark
Otodus	O. megalodon			Teeth	Largest known macropredatory shark that ever lived	Restoration of megaldodon
Parotodus	P. benedenii			Tooth		

=== Plants ===
Plants of the Duho Formation
Genus	Species	Region	Member	Material	Notes	Image
Acer	A. ezoanum; A. huziokae; A. nordenskioeldi; A. palaeoplatanoides; A. pohangense; A. protomiyabei; A. prototrifidium; A. pseudoginnala; A. rotundatum (=A. subpictum & A. pictum)					
Alangium	A. aequalifolium					
Albizia	A. miokalkora					
Castanea	C. tanaii					
Castanopsis	C. pohangensis					
Carpinus	C. hokoensis; C. kodairae-bracteata; C. miofargesiana; C. oblongibracteata; C. stenophylla; C. subcordata					
Cinnamomum	C. lanceolatum					
Cryptocarya	C. ennichiensis					
Cunninghamia	C. protokonishii					
Cyclobalanopsis	C. huziokai; C. mandraliscae; C. yabei					
Dipteronia	D. brownii					
Entada	E. mioformosana					
Fagus	F. cf. hayate					
Firmiana	F. sinomiocenica					
Fraxinus	F. oishii; F. insularis; F. sp.					
Ilex	I. protocornuta					
Keteleeria	K. ezoana					
Koelreuteria	K. quasibipinnata					
Hemitrapa	H. yokoyamae				Extinct genus of aquatic plants related to water caltrop	
Lindera	L. gaudini					
Liriodendron	L. meisenense					
Liquidambar	L. miosinica					
Paliurus	P. koreanus					
Pasania	P. miohypophaea; P. protokonishii					
Parrotia	P. fagifolia					
Phoebe	P. mioformosana					
Picea	P. kaneharai					
Pinus	P. miocenica; P. cf. prekesiya					
Platanus	P. guillelmae					
Pseudolarix	P. japonica; P. sp. A; P. sp. B					
Pseudotsuga	P. tanaii					
Pterocarya	P. asymmetrosa					
Rhododendron	R. tatewakii					
Tilia	T. asiatica; T. pentagona; T. perpendicularis					
Zelcova	Z. ungeri					

=== Ichnofossils ===
Ichnofossils of the Duho Formation
Genus	Species	Region	Member	Material	Notes	Image
Chondrites	C. isp. 1; C. isp. 2			Three deep-water ichnofossils	C. isp. 1 and C. isp. 2 are deposited under oxygen-depleted and oxygenated conditions respectively	
Palaeophycus	P. isp.					
Planolites	P. isp.					
Taenidium	T. isp.					
