= Cyclothone alba =

Scientific classification
- Domain: Eukaryota
- Kingdom: Animalia
- Phylum: Chordata
- Class: Actinopterygii
- Order: Stomiiformes
- Family: Gonostomatidae
- Genus: Cyclothone
- Species: C. alba

Binomial name
- Cyclothone alba Brauer, 1906

Species of fish

Cyclothone alba, commonly known as the bristlemouth, is a species of ray-finned fish in the genus Cyclothone. It is found across the world, in the Pacific, Indian, and Atlantic Oceans.

The species was originally described as a subspecies of Cyclothone signata: Cyclothone signata alba, by Brauer in 1906.
