= Cyclothone acclinidens =

- Specimen collected off the coast of San Diego, California in 2026

Scientific classification
- Kingdom: Animalia
- Phylum: Chordata
- Class: Actinopterygii
- Order: Stomiiformes
- Family: Gonostomatidae
- Genus: Cyclothone
- Species: C. acclinidens

Binomial name
- Cyclothone acclinidens Garman, 1899

Species of fish

Cyclothone acclinidens, commonly known as the benttooth bristlemouth, is a species of bristlemouth. It is found in the Atlantic, Pacific, and Indian Oceans.

== Description ==
Individuals reach a length of 6.3 - 6.5 cm and are brown or grey-brown in colour.

== Distribution and habitat ==
The species is bathypelagic and most often found at depths of 300 - 1500 m. It occurs in the tropical and subtropical Atlantic, Pacific, and Indian Ocean, with single record from the Southern Ocean off Bouvet Island.
