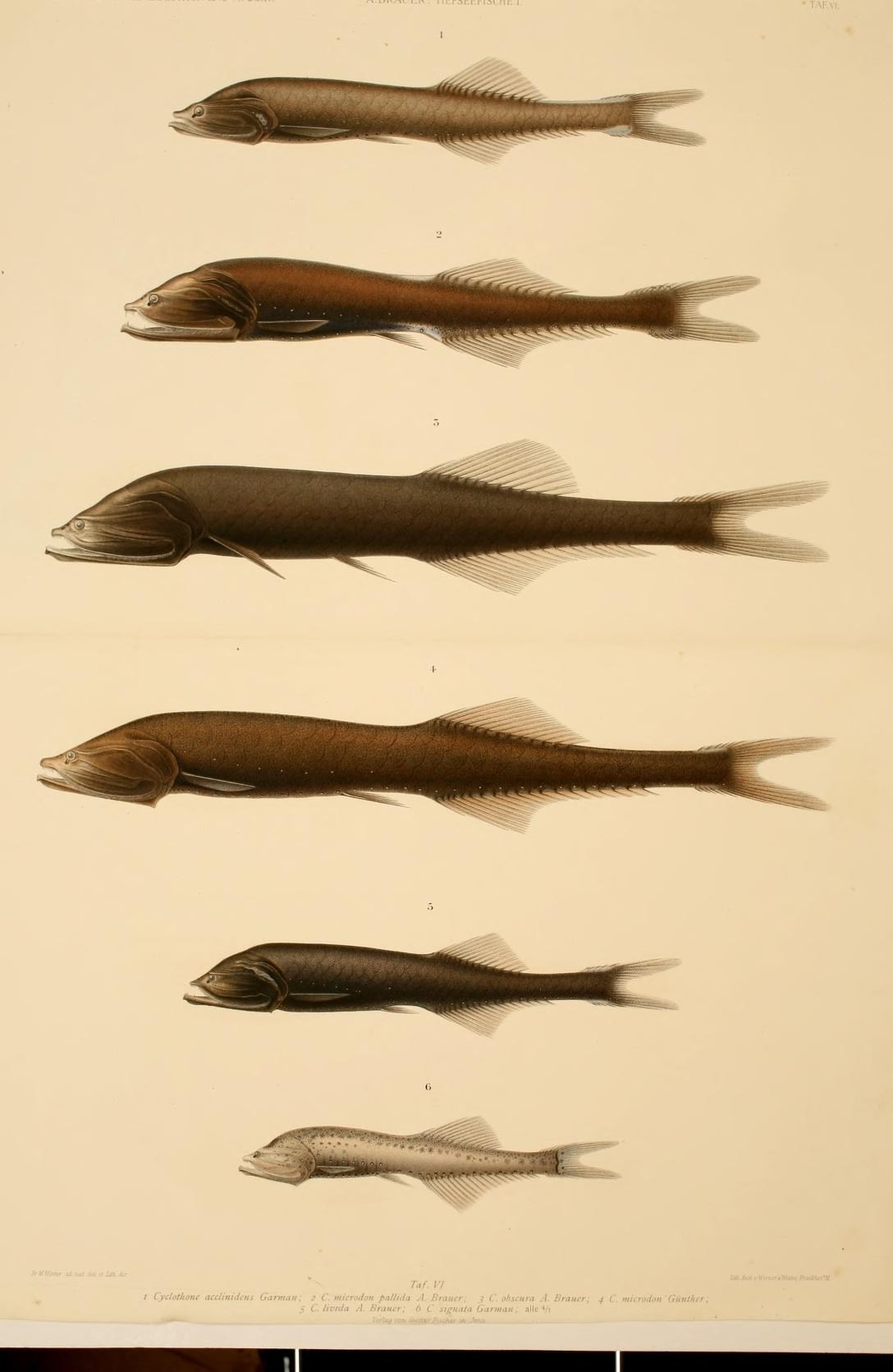
- Various Cyclothone species

Scientific classification
- Domain: Eukaryota
- Kingdom: Animalia
- Phylum: Chordata
- Class: Actinopterygii
- Order: Stomiiformes
- Family: Gonostomatidae
- Genus: Cyclothone
- Species: C. obscura

Binomial name
- Cyclothone obscura Brauer, 1902

= Cyclothone obscura =

Species of fish

Cyclothone obscura, commonly known as the hidden bristlemouth, is a species of ray-finned fish in the genus Cyclothone.
