= Pleuronichthys macrocephalus =

Scientific classification
- Kingdom: Animalia
- Phylum: Chordata
- Class: Actinopterygii
- Order: Carangiformes
- Suborder: Pleuronectoidei
- Family: Pleuronectidae
- Genus: Pleuronichthys
- Species: P. macrocephalus

Binomial name
- Pleuronichthys macrocephalus (Breder, 1936)

Synonyms
- Hypsopsetta macrocephala

Species of fish

Pleuronichthys macrocephalus is a flatfish of the family Pleuronectidae. It is a demersal fish that lives on bottoms in the tropical waters of the eastern Pacific and the Gulf of California.
