= Cyclothone parapallida =

Scientific classification
- Domain: Eukaryota
- Kingdom: Animalia
- Phylum: Chordata
- Class: Actinopterygii
- Order: Stomiiformes
- Family: Gonostomatidae
- Genus: Cyclothone
- Species: C. parapallida

Binomial name
- Cyclothone parapallida Badcock, 1982

Species of fish

Cyclothone pallida, commonly known as the shadow bristlemouth, is a species of ray-finned fish in the genus Cyclothone.
