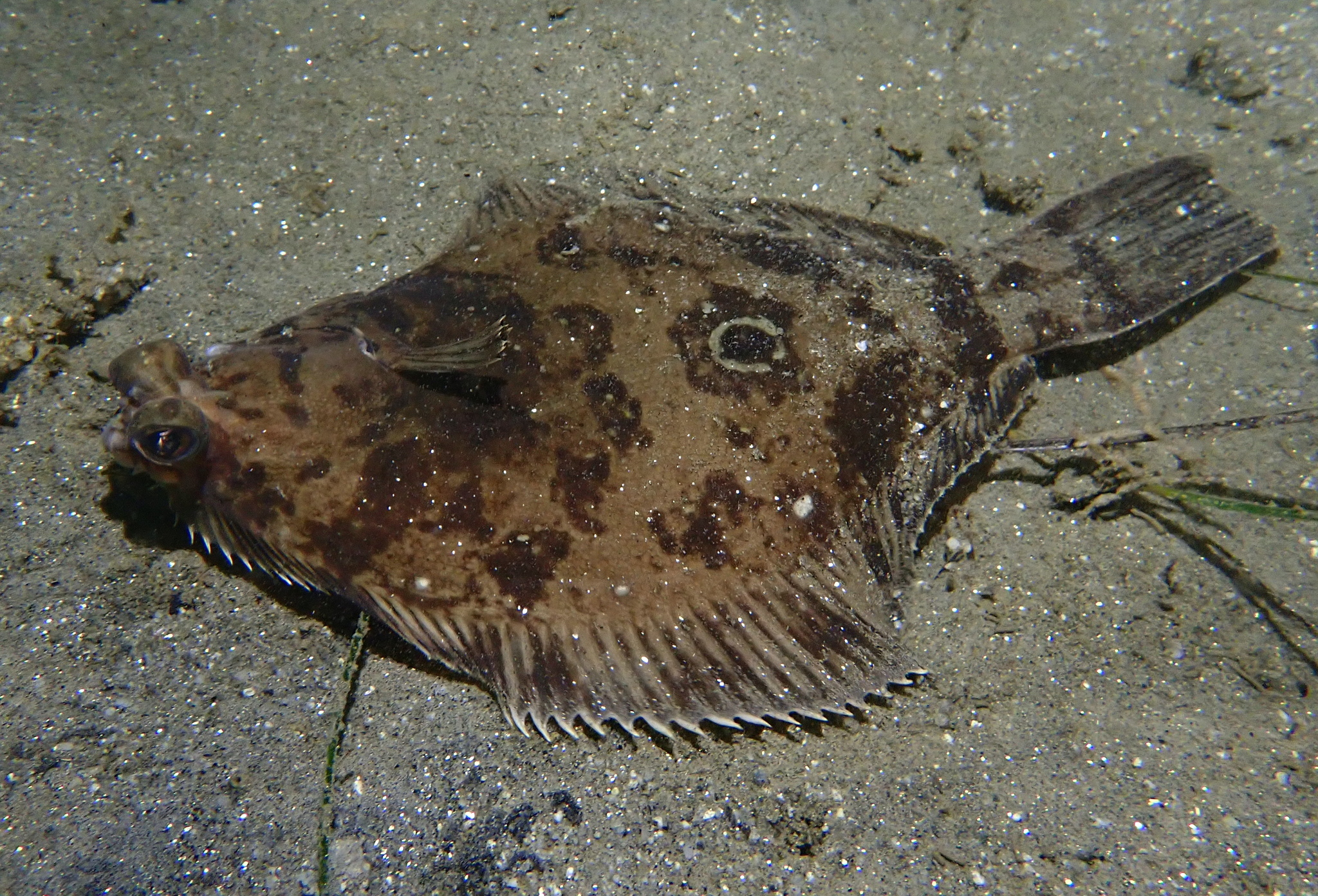

Conservation status
- Least Concern (IUCN 3.1)

Scientific classification
- Kingdom: Animalia
- Phylum: Chordata
- Class: Actinopterygii
- Order: Carangiformes
- Suborder: Pleuronectoidei
- Family: Pleuronectidae
- Genus: Pleuronichthys
- Species: P. verticalis

Binomial name
- Pleuronichthys verticalis D. S. Jordan & C. H. Gilbert, 1880
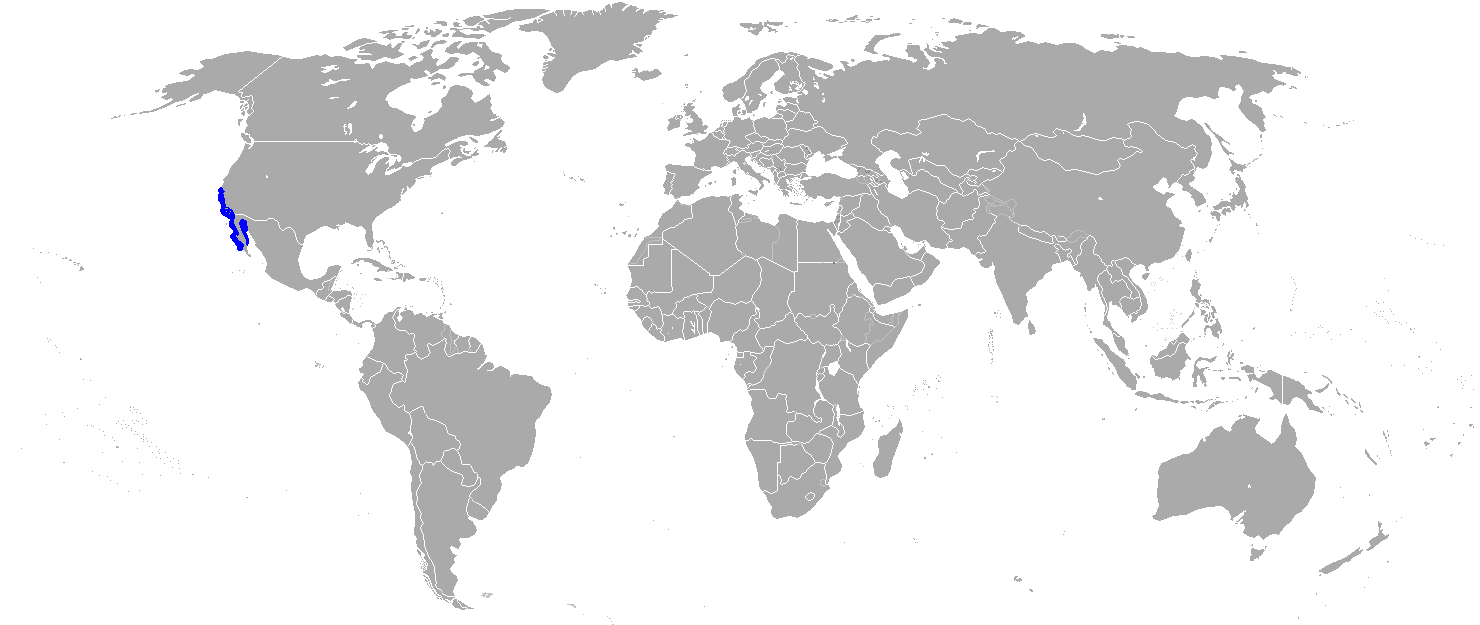
- Distribution of hornyhead turbot

= Hornyhead turbot =

Species of fish

The hornyhead turbot (Pleuronichthys verticalis) is a species of flatfish in the family Pleuronectidae. It is a demersal fish that lives on soft sand and mud bottoms at depths of between 9 and 200 metres (30 and 660 ft). Its native habitat is the subtropical waters of the eastern Pacific, from Point Reyes in California to Magdalena Bay in Baja California Sur, and the northern and central eastern parts of the Gulf of California. It can grow up to 37 centimetres (15 in) in length.

== Diet ==
The diet of the hornyhead turbot consists mainly of zoobenthos organisms, including amphipods, polychaetes and clam siphons.
