= Ocellated turbot =

Conservation status
- Least Concern (IUCN 3.1)

Scientific classification
- Kingdom: Animalia
- Phylum: Chordata
- Class: Actinopterygii
- Order: Carangiformes
- Suborder: Pleuronectoidei
- Family: Pleuronectidae
- Genus: Pleuronichthys
- Species: P. ocellatus

Binomial name
- Pleuronichthys ocellatus Starks & W. F. Thompson, 1910
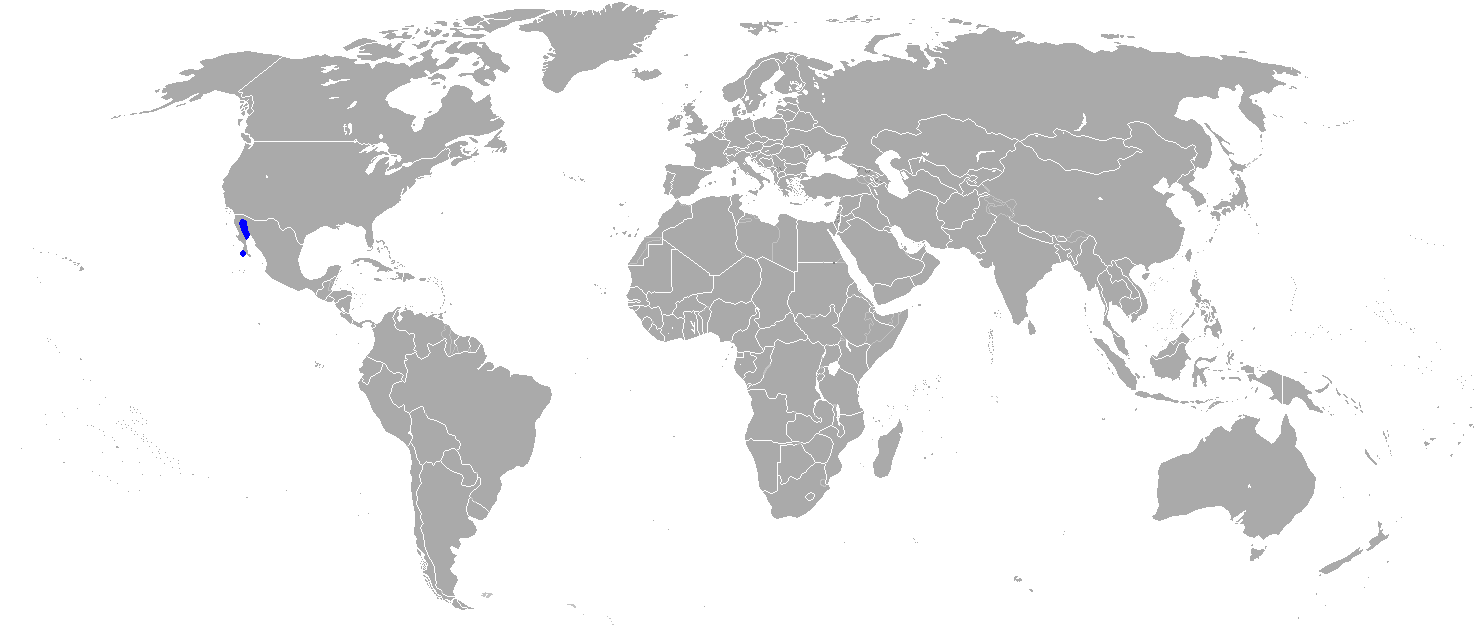
- Distribution of ocellated turbot

Species of fish

The ocellated turbot (Pleuronichthys ocellatus) is a species of flatfish in the family Pleuronectidae. It is a demersal fish that lives on bottoms at depths of between 1 and 140 metres (0 and 460 ft). Its native habitat is the subtropical waters of the eastern Pacific, specifically southern Baja California (Magdalena Bay area) and the upper Gulf of California (northern Sinaloa); it is the only member of the genus to prefer subtropical waters. It can grow up to 24 centimetres (9.4 in) in length.
