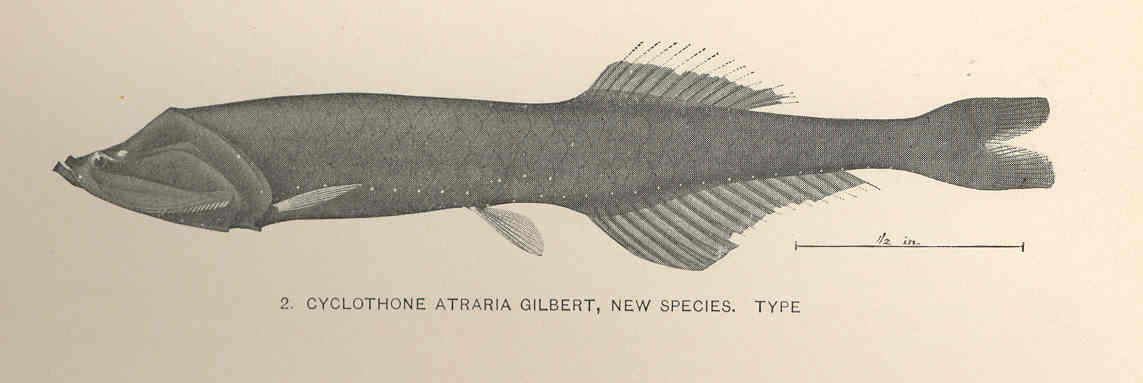

Scientific classification
- Kingdom: Animalia
- Phylum: Chordata
- Class: Actinopterygii
- Order: Stomiiformes
- Family: Gonostomatidae
- Genus: Cyclothone
- Species: C. atraria

Binomial name
- Cyclothone atraria Gilbert, 1905

= Cyclothone atraria =

Species of fish

Cyclothone atraria, commonly known as the deep-water bristlemouth, is a species of ray-finned fish in the genus Cyclothone. It is found in the North Pacific and is considered to be a part of the most abundant fish genus. Like other species in Cyclothone, the micronektonic fish spends all its life in the deeper depths of water.

== Species description ==
The genus Cyclothone is made up of small fishes with a wide range of colorations, but darker shades are more common in C. atraria. The species has protandry (fish have male organs first, and later on change to female organs). This is believed to have evolved independently from the other species besides C. microdon. The evolution of protandry might have evolved to improve fecundity within the species. Fishes in this genus are known for having a lethargic lifestyle, creating a slow metabolic rate. In terms of length, recorded mature males have a size of around 22.1 mm SL, and mature females are measured to be 39.8 mm SL. Cyclothone atraria are morphologically closest to C. microdon and C. acclinidens. C.microdon, a species found in depths similar to C. atraria, are commonly brown, further cementing the notion that deep-water dwellers have darker colors. In the Cyclothone genus, males have distinct hypertrophied nasal rosettes, well-developed muscles, and a large gill-surface area. These are indications that males lead a more active life.

Larvae and juveniles usually live in upper-depth waters and move down deeper as they grow. C. atraria are hermaphrodites, meaning they don’t have a physical trait that tells people what sex they are. Deeper depth living species in this genus are believed to have fewer bones and reduced calcification. As a result, they have more fluids in their body to level out their density.

There are no current visual skeletons of C. atraria but the Cyclothone genus is believed to be very similar to each other. In contrast to the skeleton of a species within the same genus as C. atraria in figure 2, C. atraria have 7-12 premaxillary teeth; 73-92 maxillary teeth; 14 abdominal vertebrae; 18 caudal vertebrae; 30-32 total vertebrae; 12-14 dorsal ray fins; and 17-20 anal fin rays.

== Distribution ==
Cyclothone atraria is endemic to the western North Pacific. This species has been documented off the coast of Japan near Hokkaido. It has also been caught in trawls thrown 1000 m off the coast of Oregon. It occupies the lower mesopelagic and bathypelagic zones, otherwise known as the Twilight Zone and Midnight Zone. Most inhabit depths of 400 m or below at all times. Swimming patterns do not change drastically based on the night or day, but there are slight variations among sexes within subadults. Males swim in depths ranging from 450 m to 1000 m. Females, on the other hand, have a range of 600 m to 1000 m. They do not participate in diurnal vertical migration. Younger C. atraria are more common in the shallower depths, but otherwise, C. atraria is most abundant in the deeper parts of its range. This species is one of the 6 in its genus to live in deep depths. In depths below 300 m, there are no seasonal changes in temperature.

== Life history ==
=== Reproduction ===
C. atraria have an annual synchronous reproductive cycle. Spawning season is from June to August, but there are a few that have their cycle from October to December. During the months leading up to their spawning season, there is a noticeable increase in mature females to immature females, but the ratio between the two levels begins to even out around October. In preparation for their eggs, female C. atraria increase in size. From February to April, most of them are <300 μm. Around June to August, they reach >300 μm. This is around the time they are believed to reach ovulation. Female C. atraria release all their eggs at once and spawn multiple times during their life. Usually, they can spawn 3-4 times. The number of eggs produced ranges from 448 (in smaller fish around 35 mm SL) to 3128 (in larger fish around 60 mm SL). Most eggs have an average size of 0.5 mm.

C. atraria are considered iteroparous. In a study focusing on the reproduction of Cyclothone, they grouped female fish reproduction into 6 stages. In stage I, the ovaries are small and transparent. The average ovarian diameter is 0.02-0.08 mm. In stage II, a little larger and translucent. The average ovarian diameter is 0.05-0.16 mm. In stage III/V, the ovaries are firm and opaque. Its average is 0.11-0.41 mm. In stage VI, the ovaries are large and visible to the naked eye. Its average ovarian diameter is 0.40-0.54 mm. In stage VII, the ovaries have shrunk. In stage VII/II, the ovaries are a little flaccid.

Males are less than 30 mm, while females are usually greater than 35 mm SL. Those between 30 mm - 35 mm SL are believed to be undergoing sex reversal. Males reach maturity after three years. Females reach maturity around five or six years. C. atraria are believed to grow especially during winter and spring, and not so much during summer or autumn. Most males grow rapidly during sex reversal, but for those who don’t participate in breeding, growth greatly varies. The bigger fish live to be around 8 years or more. Every year, they are believed to grow 5 mm.

The Cyclothone genus is believed to have buoyant eggs that rise to upper depths and hatch there. Thus, there is no parental care for the larvae. They are believed to move into deeper depths during metamorphosis.

==== Feeding/behavior ====
Cyclothone atraria feed mainly on copepods, ostracods, and other crustaceans. Considering the environment C. atraria live in, most have empty stomachs and are opportunistic eaters. The most common species found in the stomachs of C. atraria was Pleuromamma. It could be because of Pleuromamma’s ability to create light, making them easier to spot. Most feeding occurs at night and during the day for Cyclothone, but catches tend to be low. In a different study done around the Western Mediterranean, 40-70% of Cyclothone caught tend to have empty stomachs. For instance, hundreds of C. braueri were opened, and the average number of prey in their stomachs was 8. This was very low compared to other genera who ranged from 20-60 prey. Most of their diet in this study revealed a high percentage of their prey was for calanoids (copepods) and ostracods. It’s unclear if their age differs in age classes, but in C. maderensis, they changed a portion of their diet depending on the seasons. It is likely because of the increase of numbers in that particular prey during the season. However, the number of mature and immature Cyclothone caught was uneven, so it could have been because of the imbalance of data. It is believed that their vertical migration is a result of resource partitioning among the genus, as many live in the same depths.

The genus Cyclothone has a swim bladder made up of gas. As they age, the swim bladder begins to fill with fat. Some species within this genus are described to be non-gas-bearing. The deeper depth living species have reduced gas glands. This deterioration might be connected to the depths they live in. The fat provides stable buoyancy and acts as an energy reserve. C. atraria is most closely related to C. microdon, which has been shown to have a gas-depleted swim bladder. In a study investigating the genus, lower depth-living species were found to have a lower mass density than those living in shallower depths. They also had limited consumption rates and lower energy intakes. In the same study, it was noted that Cyclothone species residing in lower depths were much larger than those found in higher depths.

== Conservation status ==
Under the IUCN, the species is listed as a least concern. The species is part of the genus Cyclothone, one of the most abundant vertebrates.

== Importance to humans ==
Many are attained for purposes such as research or for consumption. The genus makes up 50-70% of fish catches in temperate and tropical waters. They are harvested for their fat and protein. They are caught using trawls, and because of their small size, it can be hard for them to avoid capture. Despite this, they are great in numbers and are not considered to be rare. Although there are no clear numbers due to a lack of research.
