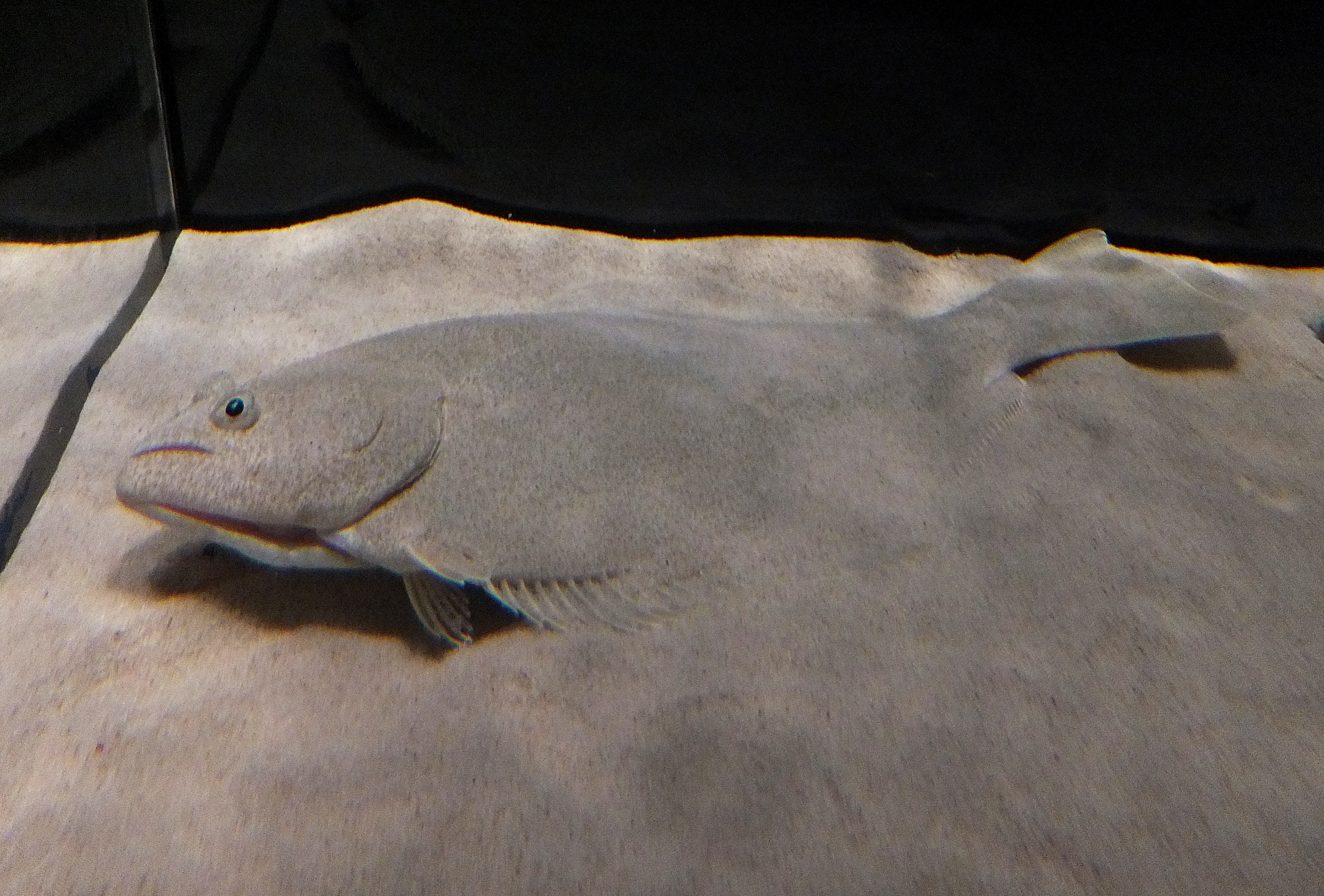

Conservation status
- Data Deficient (IUCN 3.1)

Scientific classification
- Kingdom: Animalia
- Phylum: Chordata
- Class: Actinopterygii
- Division: Teleostei
- Order: Carangiformes
- Suborder: Pleuronectoidei
- Family: Pleuronectidae
- Genus: Pleuronichthys
- Species: P. cornutus

Binomial name
- Pleuronichthys cornutus (Temminck & Schlegel, 1846)

Synonyms
- Platessa cornuta Temminck & Schlegel, 1846; Pleuronectes cornutus (Temminck & Schlegel, 1846); Pleuronichthys lighti Wu, 1929

= Ridged-eye flounder =

Species of fish

The ridged-eye flounder (Pleuronichthys cornutus), also known as the frog flounder, is a species of flatfish in the family Pleuronectidae. It is a demersal fish that lives on sand and mud coastal bottoms at depths of between 2 and 170 metres (6.6 and 557.7 ft). Its native habitat is the temperate waters of the north-western Pacific, from southern Hokkaido to the Korean Peninsula, the Bohai Sea, the Yellow Sea and the South China Sea. It can grow up to 30 centimetres (12 in) in length, and can weigh up to 1 kilogram (2.2 lb).
