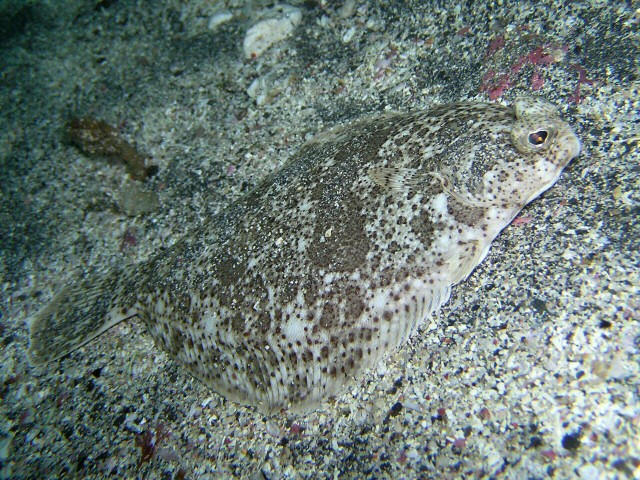
- Pleuronichthys japonicus

Scientific classification
- Kingdom: Animalia
- Phylum: Chordata
- Class: Actinopterygii
- Division: Teleostei
- Order: Carangiformes
- Suborder: Pleuronectoidei
- Family: Pleuronectidae
- Subfamily: Pleuronichthyinae
- Genus: Pleuronichthys; Girard, 1854

Type species
- Pleuronichthys coenosus Girard, 1854

Synonyms
- Heteroprosopon Bleeker, 1862; Hypsopsetta T. N. Gill, 1862; †Zororhombus Jordan and Gilbert, 1920

= Pleuronichthys =

Pleuronichthys Temporal range: Late Miocene–present

Genus of fishes

Pleuronichthys is a genus of righteye flounders, sometimes considered a monospecific subfamily (Pleuronichthyinae), in the family Pleuronectidae found in the Pacific Ocean.

== Species ==
There are currently 9 recognized species in this genus:

- Pleuronichthys coenosus Girard, 1854 (C-O sole)
- Pleuronichthys cornutus (Temminck & Schlegel, 1846) (Ridge-eyed flounder)
- Pleuronichthys decurrens D. S. Jordan & C. H. Gilbert, 1881 (Curlfin sole)
- Pleuronichthys guttulatus (Girard, 1856) (Diamond turbot)
- Pleuronichthys japonicus S. Suzuki, Kawashima & Nakabo, 2009
- Pleuronichthys macrocephalus (Breder, 1936)
- Pleuronichthys ocellatus Starks & W. F. Thompson, 1910 (Ocellated turbot)
- Pleuronichthys ritteri Starks & E. L. Morris, 1907 (Spotted turbot)
- Pleuronichthys verticalis D. S. Jordan & C. H. Gilbert, 1880 (Horny-head turbot)

One fossil species, †Pleuronichthys veliger (Jordan in Jordan & Gilbert, 1920) is known from the Late Miocene of California, US. Fossils attributed to indeterminate species of this genus present at the mid-Miocene Duho Formation of South Korea.
