= Delectopecten thermus =

Scientific classification
- Kingdom: Animalia
- Phylum: Mollusca
- Class: Bivalvia
- Order: Pectinida
- Family: Pectinidae
- Genus: Delectopecten
- Species: D. thermus

Binomial name
- Delectopecten thermus Y.-T. Lin, 2025

Species of marine bivalve mollusk

Delectopecten thermus is a species of marine bivalve mollusk in the family Pectinidae, the scallops. The holotype was collected at a depth of 962 m from the Higashi-Ensei vent field, in the northern Okinawa Trough off the coast of southern Japan.

Among its congeners, D. thermus most resembles D. vancouverensis and D. gelatinosus, but differs in the notably unequal sizes of its anterior and posterior auricles, strongly curved anterior auricle of the left valve, and greater byssal notch angle. D. thermus is the only species of its genus recorded exclusively from hydrothermal vents.

Though D. thermus occurs in a chemosynthetic ecosystem, sequencing of the microbial 16S rRNA gene revealed that it does not host chemosynthetic symbionts. Genomic analysis by Lin et al. 2025 revealed significant mitogenomic rearrangement, mirroring the process observed in deep-water propeamussiids, which the authors theorized to be an adaptation to the deep sea.
