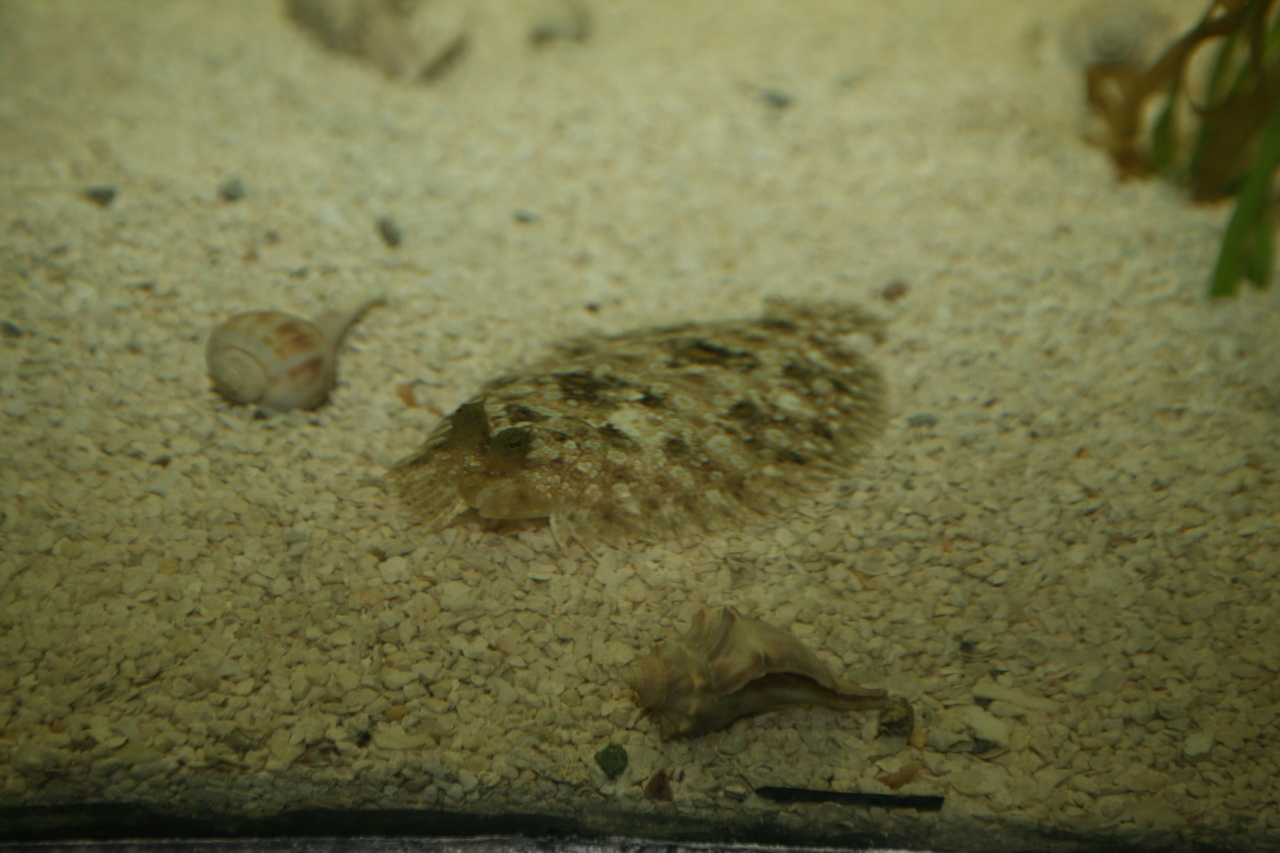

Conservation status
- Least Concern (IUCN 3.1)

Scientific classification
- Kingdom: Animalia
- Phylum: Chordata
- Class: Actinopterygii
- Order: Carangiformes
- Suborder: Pleuronectoidei
- Family: Pleuronectidae
- Genus: Pleuronichthys
- Species: P. coenosus

Binomial name
- Pleuronichthys coenosus Girard, 1854

Synonyms
- Pleuronichthys nephelus Starks & Thompson, 1910

= C-O sole =

Species of fish

The C-O sole (Pleuronichthys coenosus) is a species of flatfish in the family Pleuronectidae. It is a demersal fish that lives on flat bottoms and rocky areas at depths of between 18 and 350 metres (59 and 1,148 ft). Its native habitat is the temperate waters of the eastern Pacific, ranging from Sitka, Alaska in the north to San Quintín, Baja California in the south. It can grow up to 36 centimetres (14 in) in length.

== Nomenclature ==
The C-O sole gets its name from the markings on its caudal fin: a crescent shape and a ring, which resemble a letter C and a letter O.

== Description ==
The C-O sole is a right-eyed flatfish with large, bulbous eyes located near the tip of the snout. The upper surface is mottled light to dark brown, with occasional white spots; there is usually a prominent mid-body dark spot with a pale patch behind it. The underside is light. There is a dark crescent-shaped marking and a large dark spot on the caudal fin, which together resemble the letters C and O.

== Diet ==
The diet of the C-O sole consists mainly of zoobenthos polychaetes, bivalves and amphipods.
