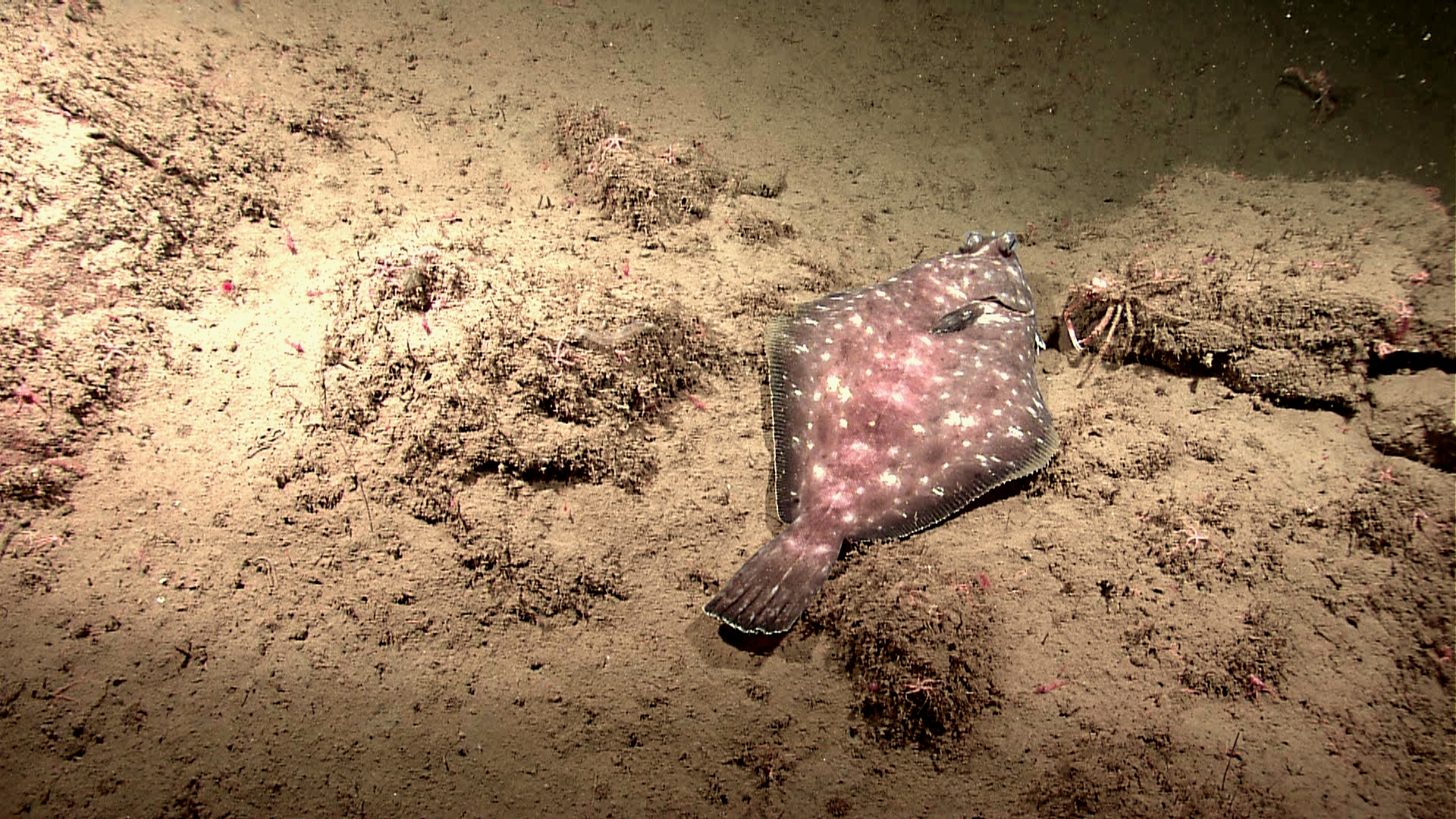

Conservation status
- Least Concern (IUCN 3.1)

Scientific classification
- Kingdom: Animalia
- Phylum: Chordata
- Class: Actinopterygii
- Order: Carangiformes
- Suborder: Pleuronectoidei
- Family: Pleuronectidae
- Genus: Pleuronichthys
- Species: P. ritteri

Binomial name
- Pleuronichthys ritteri Starks & E. L. Morris, 1907
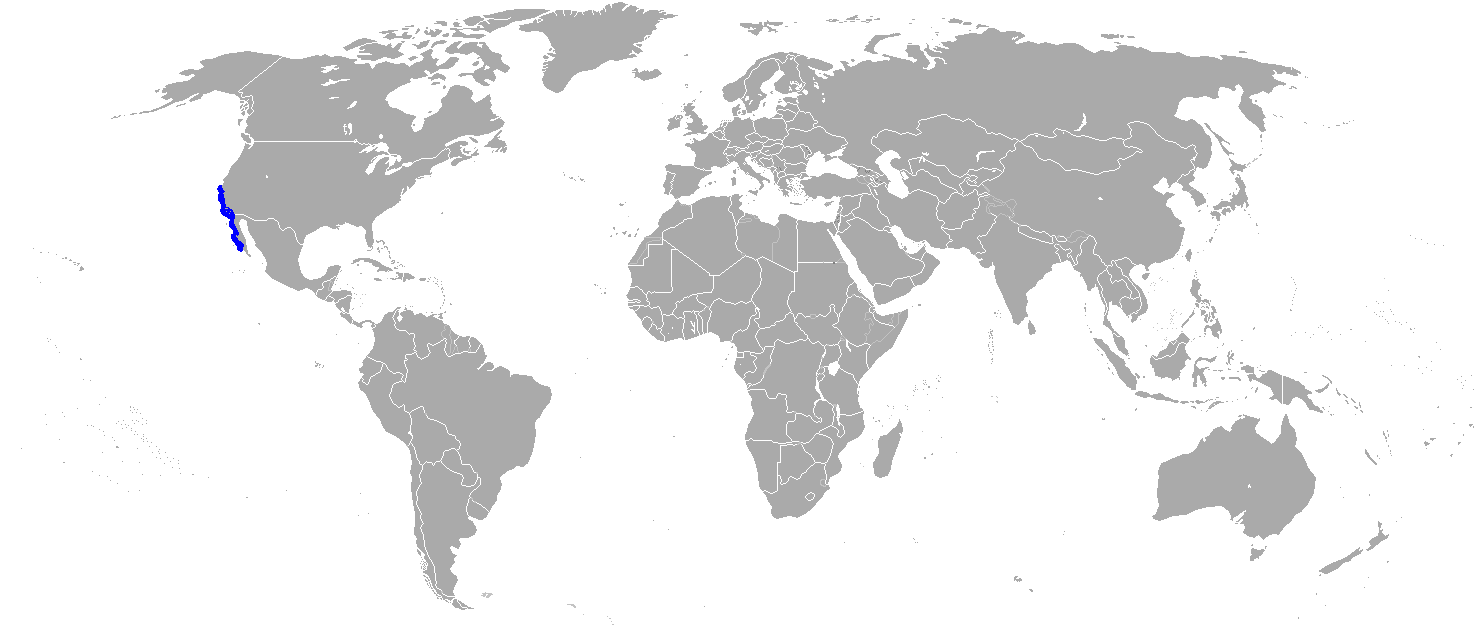
- Distribution of spotted turbot

= Spotted turbot =

Species of fish

The spotted turbot (Pleuronichthys ritteri) is a species of flatfish in the family Pleuronectidae. It is a demersal fish that lives on bottoms at depths of between 1 and 50 metres (0 and 160 ft). Its native habitat is the subtropical waters of the eastern Pacific, from Morro Bay in California to southern Baja California in Mexico. It can grow up to 30 centimetres (12 in) in length.
