= Cyclothone duhoensis =

Cyclothone duhoensis Temporal range: Middle Miocene

Scientific classification
- Domain: Eukaryota
- Kingdom: Animalia
- Phylum: Chordata
- Class: Actinopterygii
- Order: Stomiiformes
- Family: Gonostomatidae
- Genus: Cyclothone
- Species: †C. duhoensis

Binomial name
- †Cyclothone duhoensis Nam & Nazarkin, 2021

Extinct species of fish

Cyclothone duhoensis is an extinct species of bristlemouth fish that lived during the Middle Miocene.

== Distribution ==
Cyclothone duhoensis is known from the Duho Formation of South Korea.
