= Cyclothone signata =

Scientific classification
- Kingdom: Animalia
- Phylum: Chordata
- Class: Actinopterygii
- Order: Stomiiformes
- Family: Gonostomatidae
- Genus: Cyclothone
- Species: C. signata

Binomial name
- Cyclothone signata Garman, 1899

Species of fish

Cyclothone signata, the showy bristlemouth, is a species of ray-finned fish in the genus Cyclothone.

Cyclothone alba was originally described as a subspecies of C. signata: Cyclothone signata alba, by Brauer in 1906.

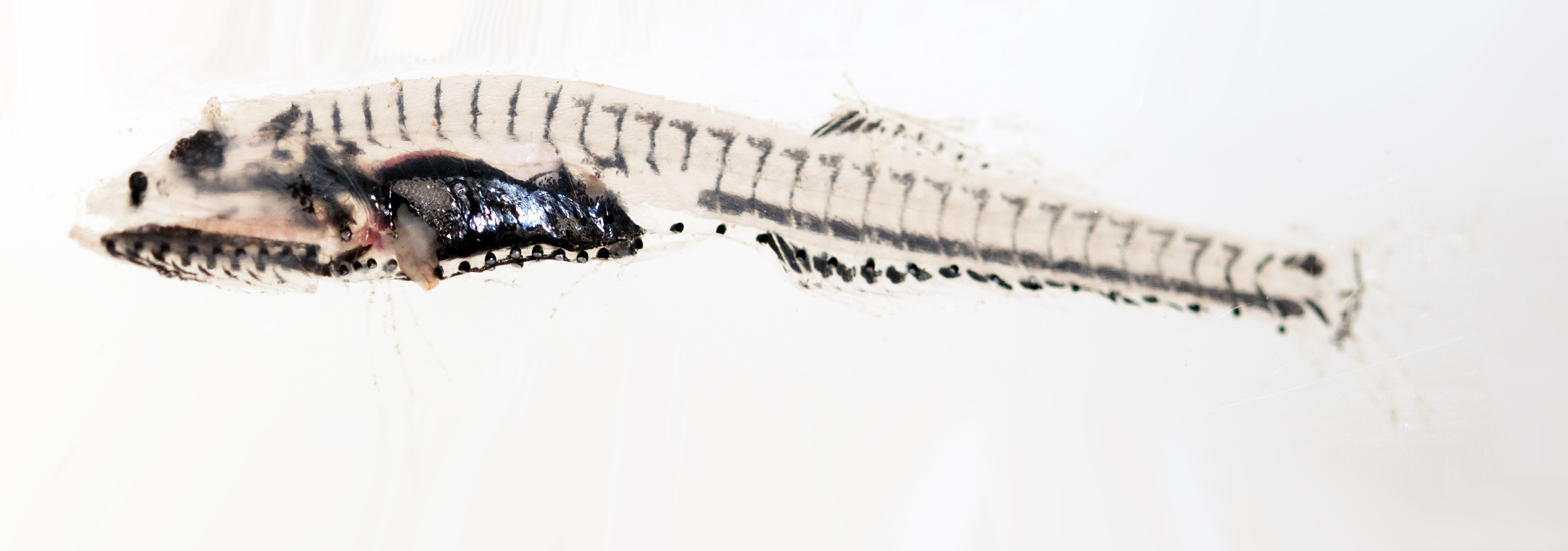
Showy bristlemouth

== Description ==
C. signata is disruptively colored, typically being either gray or transparent.

== Ecology ==
The species is usually found to be bimodally distributed among the shallow and deep ends of the mesopelagic zone, and is thought to migrate vertically between them, feeding in the shallow areas, and descending to the deeper ocean to rest.

The species is oviparous. Encounters with the species are rare, but one sample, taken off the coast of the Gulf of Maine in 1915, measured 23mm.

Cyclothone bristlemouths are widely regarded as the most abundant vertebrates on earth, numbering in the trillions or higher.
