= Cyclothone braueri =

Scientific classification
- Kingdom: Animalia
- Phylum: Chordata
- Class: Actinopterygii
- Order: Stomiiformes
- Family: Gonostomatidae
- Genus: Cyclothone
- Species: C. braueri

Binomial name
- Cyclothone braueri Jespersen & Tåning, 1926

Species of fish

Cyclothone braueri, commonly known as the garrick, is a species of ray-finned fish in the genus Cyclothone.
