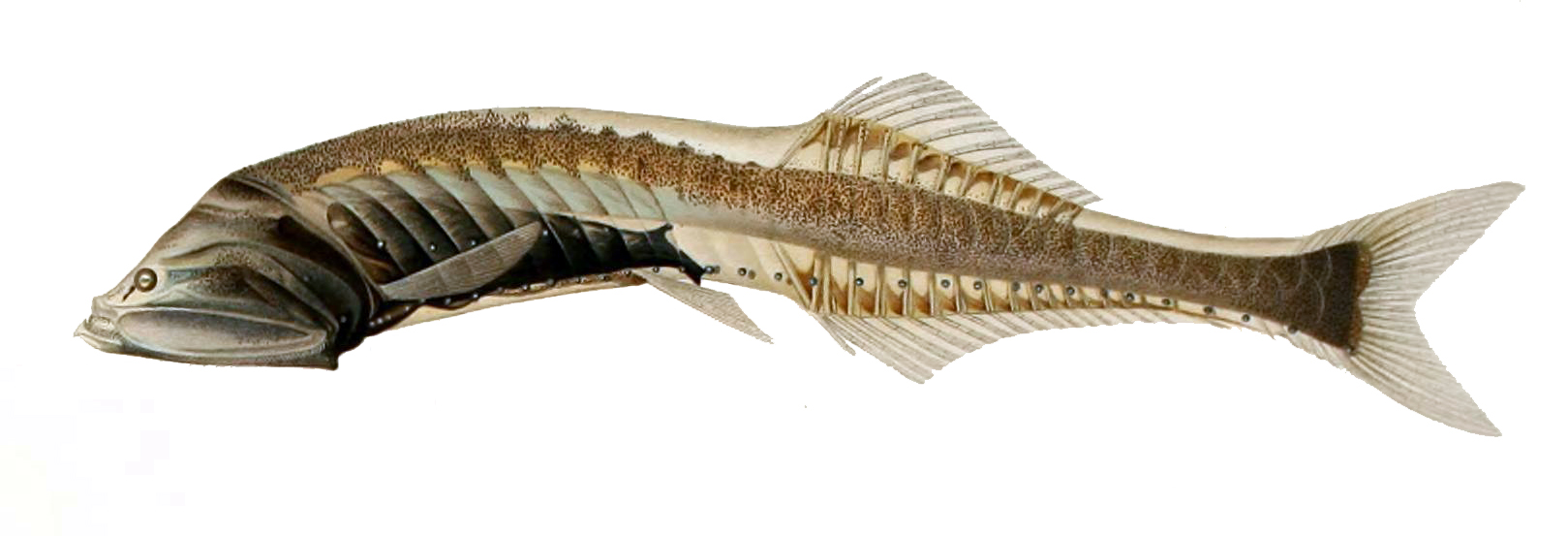
- From E. Zugmayer 1911.

Conservation status
- Least Concern (IUCN 3.1)

Scientific classification
- Kingdom: Animalia
- Phylum: Chordata
- Class: Actinopterygii
- Order: Stomiiformes
- Family: Gonostomatidae
- Genus: Cyclothone
- Species: C. microdon

Binomial name
- Cyclothone microdon (Günther, 1878)

= Veiled anglemouth =

Species of fish

The veiled anglemouth (Cyclothone microdon) is a bristlemouth of the family Gonostomatidae, abundant in all the world's oceans at depths of 300–2,500 meters (980–8,200 feet). Its length is 10–15 cm (4–6 in) though the largest known specimen is 7.6 cm (3.0 in). It gets its name from its circular mouth, filled with small teeth: the name "cyclothone" means in a circle or around and "microdon" means small teeth. The International Union for Conservation of Nature (IUCN) has assessed the veiled anglemouth is of Least Concern due to its abundance in most oceans and the little effect human impact has on its population growth. Some of the veiled anglemouth's physical features include a brown to black body with a radiating, or expansive, bioluminescent pigment over its head and fins.

== Sources ==
- Froese, Rainer; Pauly, Daniel (eds.). "Cyclothone microdon". FishBase. April 2006 version.
- Tony Ayling & Geoffrey Cox, Collins Guide to the Sea Fishes of New Zealand, (William Collins Publishers Ltd, Auckland, New Zealand 1982) ISBN 0-00-216987-8
- Harold, A. (2015). "Cyclothone microdon". IUCN Red List of Threatened Species. 2015 e.T190133A42691704. doi:10.2305/IUCN.UK.2015-4.RLTS.T190133A42691704.en.
- http://www.arctic.uoguelph.ca/cpl/organisms/fish/marine/bristlemouths/veiled.htm
- https://www.cambridge.org/core/journals/journal-of-the-marine-biological-association-of-the-united-kingdom/article/distribution-and-diet-of-cyclothone-microdon-gonostomatidae-in-a-submarine-canyon/8D18D4624EDC95BB5A22D7C42C7201D5
