= Cyclothone kobayashii =

Scientific classification
- Domain: Eukaryota
- Kingdom: Animalia
- Phylum: Chordata
- Class: Actinopterygii
- Order: Stomiiformes
- Family: Gonostomatidae
- Genus: Cyclothone
- Species: C. kobayashii

Binomial name
- Cyclothone kobayashii Miya, 1994

Species of fish

Cyclothone kobayashii, commonly known as the Kobayashi's bristlemouth, is a species of ray-finned fish in the genus Cyclothone. It is found in the Southern Ocean.
