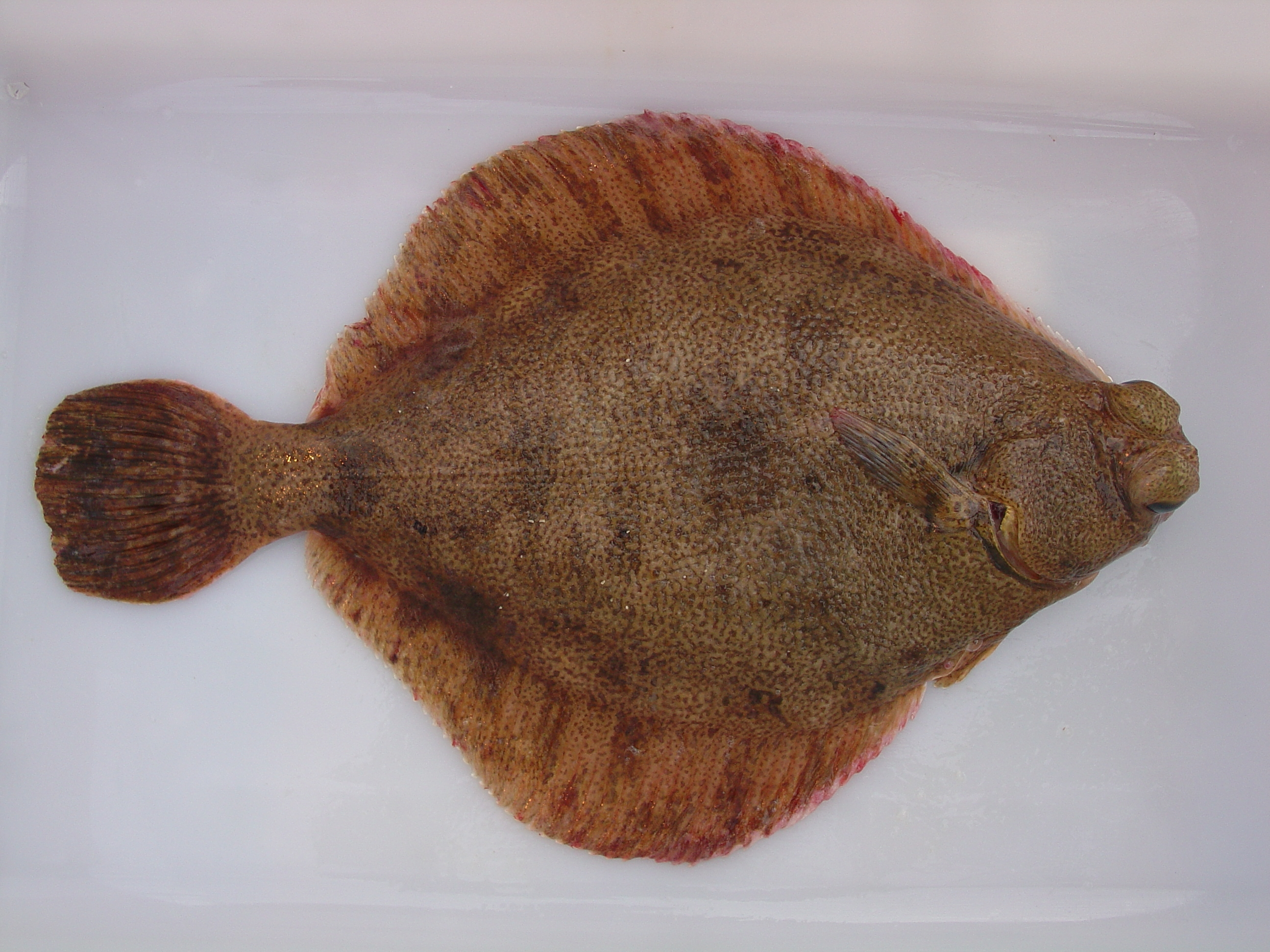

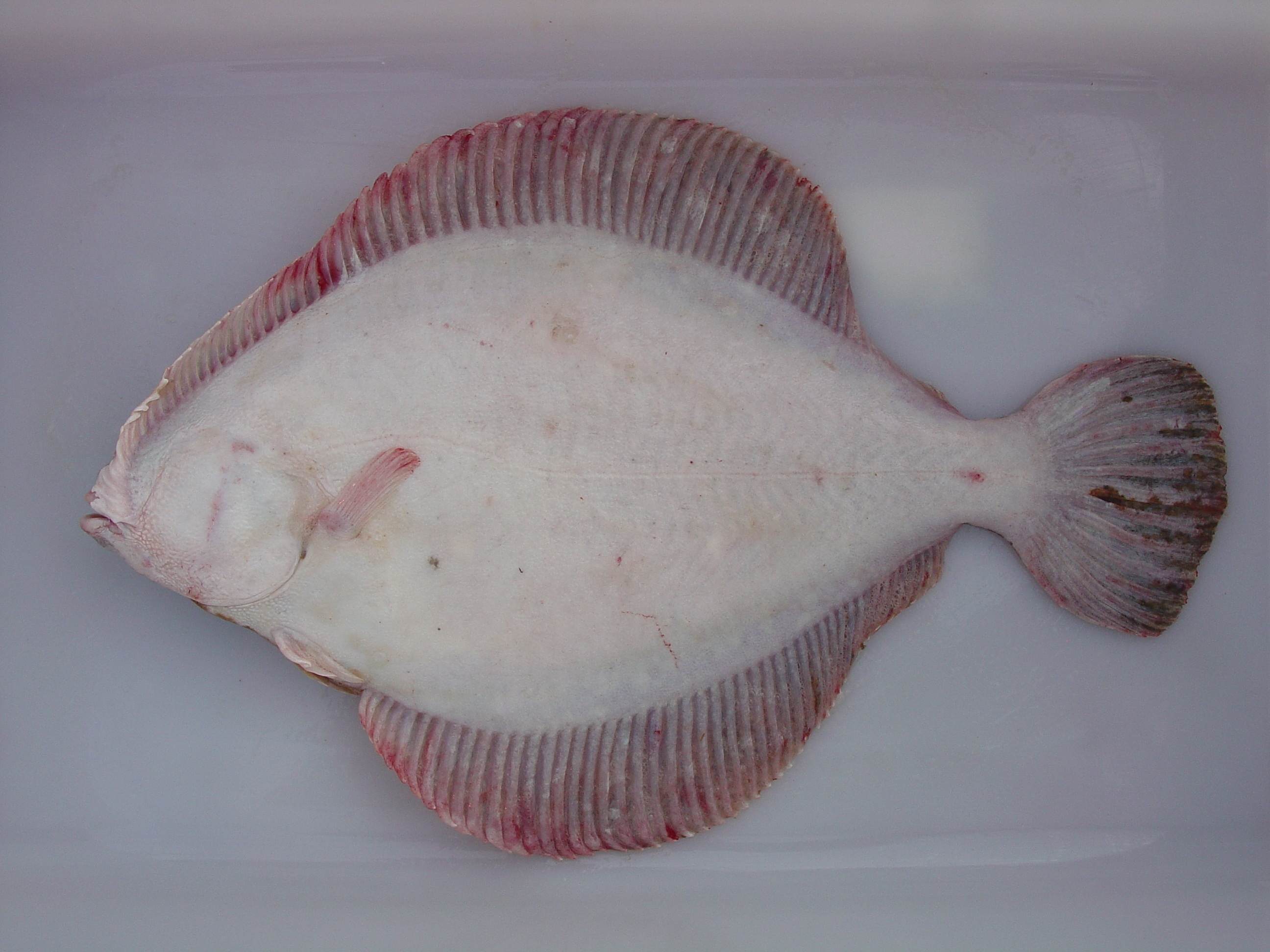

Conservation status
- Least Concern (IUCN 3.1)

Scientific classification
- Kingdom: Animalia
- Phylum: Chordata
- Class: Actinopterygii
- Order: Carangiformes
- Suborder: Pleuronectoidei
- Family: Pleuronectidae
- Genus: Pleuronichthys
- Species: P. decurrens

Binomial name
- Pleuronichthys decurrens D. S. Jordan & C. H. Gilbert, 1881
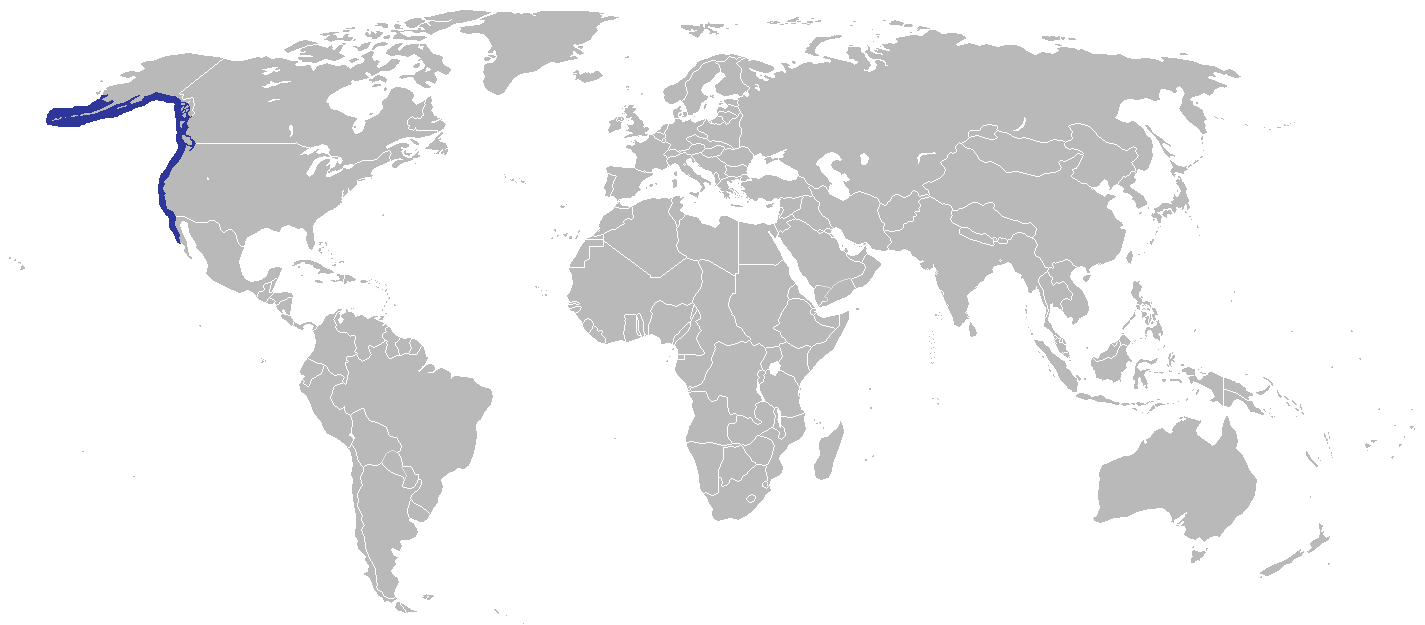
- Distribution of curlfin sole

= Curlfin sole =

Species of fish

The curlfin sole (Pleuronichthys decurrens) is a species of flatfish in the family Pleuronectidae. It was first described to science by David Starr Jordan and Charles Henry Gilbert, his long-time mentee.

It is a demersal fish that lives on soft bottoms at depths of between 8 and 530 metres (30 and 1,740 ft). Its native habitat is the subtropical waters of the eastern Pacific, from Prince William Sound, Alaska in the north to San Quintín, Baja California in the south. It can grow up to 37 centimetres (15 in) in length, and reach weights of up to 775 grams (1.709 lb), with females generally being larger than males.

== Description ==
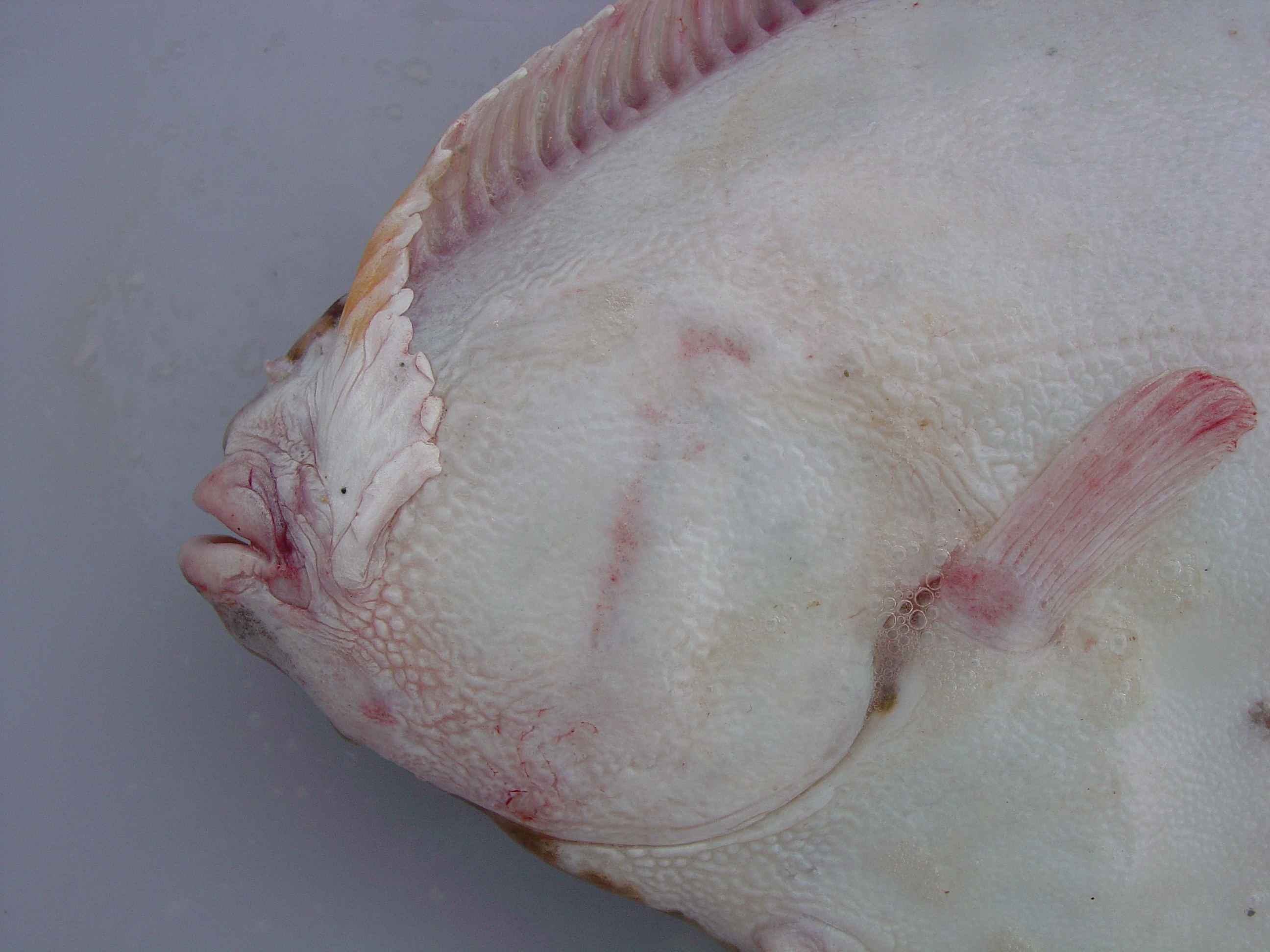
Detail of the dorsal fin curl from which the species derives its common name

The curlfin sole is a right-eyed flatfish with large, closely set eyes and a small mouth. The upper surface is reddish brown to dark brown or black, usually with brown or grey mottling; the underside is light. The fins are dark in colour, and the caudal fin is rounded. There is a high, bony ridge between the eyes with a blunt spine at each end.

== Diet ==
The diet of the curlfin sole consists mainly of zoobenthos polychaetes, crustacean eggs and brittle stars.

== Reproduction ==
The curlfin sole spawns from April to August, and eggs hatch within seven days of fertilisation.
