= Cyclothone livida =

Scientific classification
- Domain: Eukaryota
- Kingdom: Animalia
- Phylum: Chordata
- Class: Actinopterygii
- Order: Stomiiformes
- Family: Gonostomatidae
- Genus: Cyclothone
- Species: C. livida

Binomial name
- Cyclothone livida Brauer, 1902

Species of fish

Cyclothone livida is a species of ray-finned fish in the genus Cyclothone. It is found in the Eastern Atlantic Ocean.
