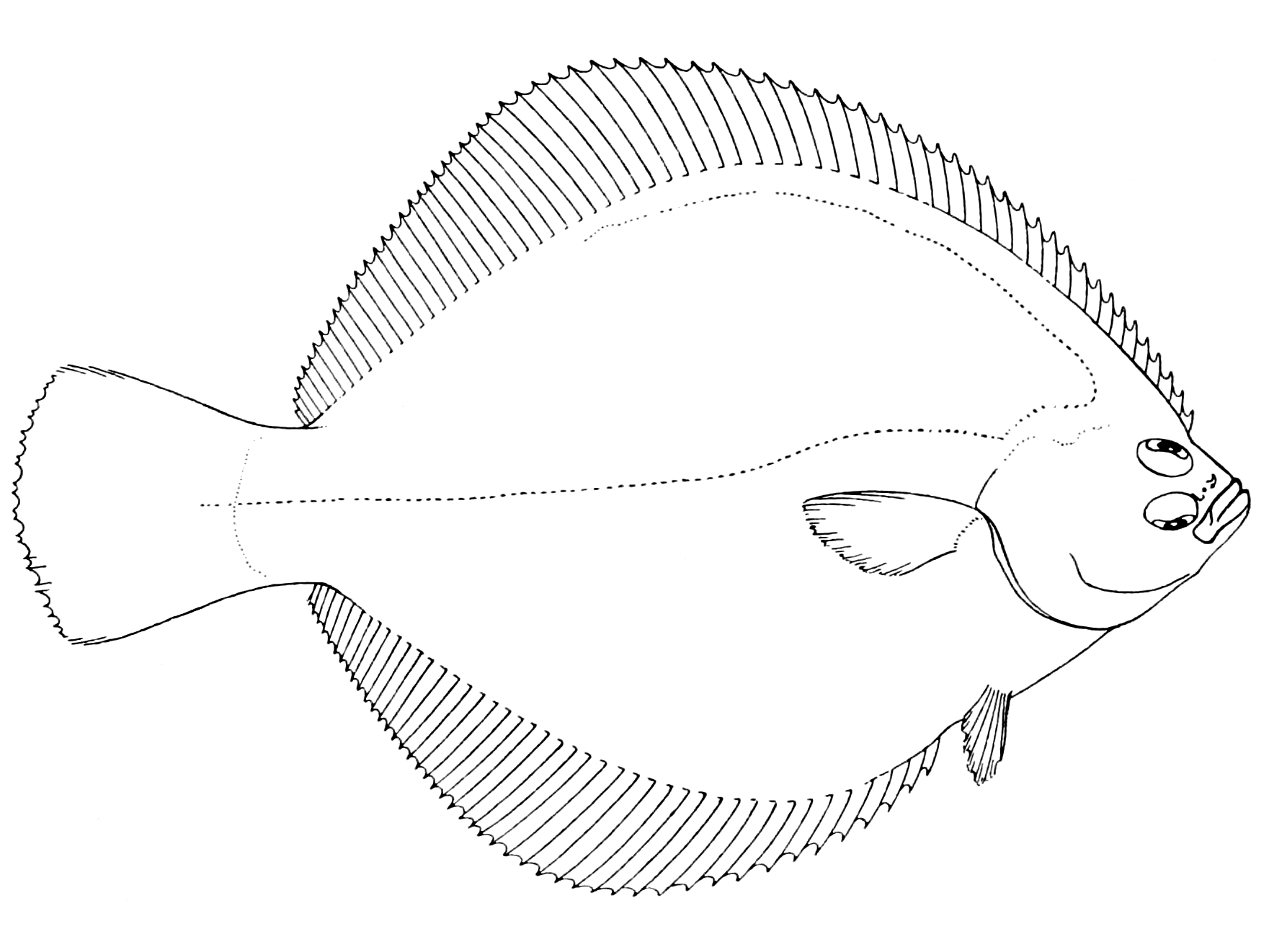

Conservation status
- Least Concern (IUCN 3.1)

Scientific classification
- Kingdom: Animalia
- Phylum: Chordata
- Class: Actinopterygii
- Order: Carangiformes
- Suborder: Pleuronectoidei
- Family: Pleuronectidae
- Genus: Pleuronichthys
- Species: P. guttulatus

Binomial name
- Pleuronichthys guttulatus Girard, 1856

Synonyms
- Hypsopsetta guttulata (Girard, 1856); Parophrys ayresii Günther, 1862

= Diamond turbot =

Species of fish

The diamond turbot (Pleuronichthys guttulatus) is a flatfish of the family Pleuronectidae. It is a demersal fish that lives in subtropical waters on sand or mud bottoms at depths of up to 50 metres (160 ft), though it is most commonly found between 1 and 20 metres (0 and 70 ft). Its native habitat is the coastal areas of the eastern Pacific, from Cape Mendocino, California in the north to Baja California in Mexico in the south. The turbot is dark green with light blue spots. It reaches up to 46 centimetres (18 in) in length, and its maximum reported lifespan is 9 years.

== Diet ==
The diamond turbot feeds almost entirely during daylight, and its diet consists of benthos invertebrates such as polychaetes, molluscs and shrimps.
