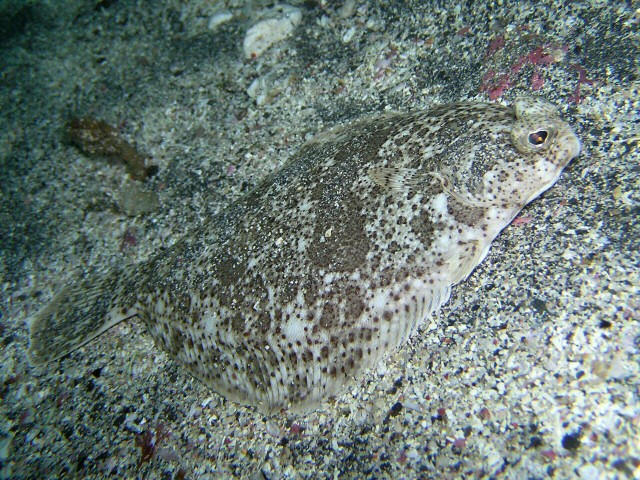

Scientific classification
- Domain: Eukaryota
- Kingdom: Animalia
- Phylum: Chordata
- Class: Actinopterygii
- Order: Carangiformes
- Suborder: Pleuronectoidei
- Family: Pleuronectidae
- Genus: Pleuronichthys
- Species: P. japonicus

Binomial name
- Pleuronichthys japonicus S. Suzuki, Kawashima & Nakabo, 2009

= Pleuronichthys japonicus =

Species of fish

Pleuronichthys japonicus is a species of flatfish in the family Pleuronectidae. It is a demersal fish that lives on bottoms at depths of between 40 and 143 metres (131 and 469 ft). It is found in the northwest Pacific off the coast of Japan and can grow up to 24 centimetres (9.4 in) in length.
