= Cyclothone pseudopallida =

Scientific classification
- Domain: Eukaryota
- Kingdom: Animalia
- Phylum: Chordata
- Class: Actinopterygii
- Order: Stomiiformes
- Family: Gonostomatidae
- Genus: Cyclothone
- Species: C. pseudopallida

Binomial name
- Cyclothone pseudopallida Mukhacheva, 1964

Species of fish

Cyclothone pseudopallida, commonly known as the slender bristlemouth, is a species of ray-finned fish in the genus Cyclothone.
