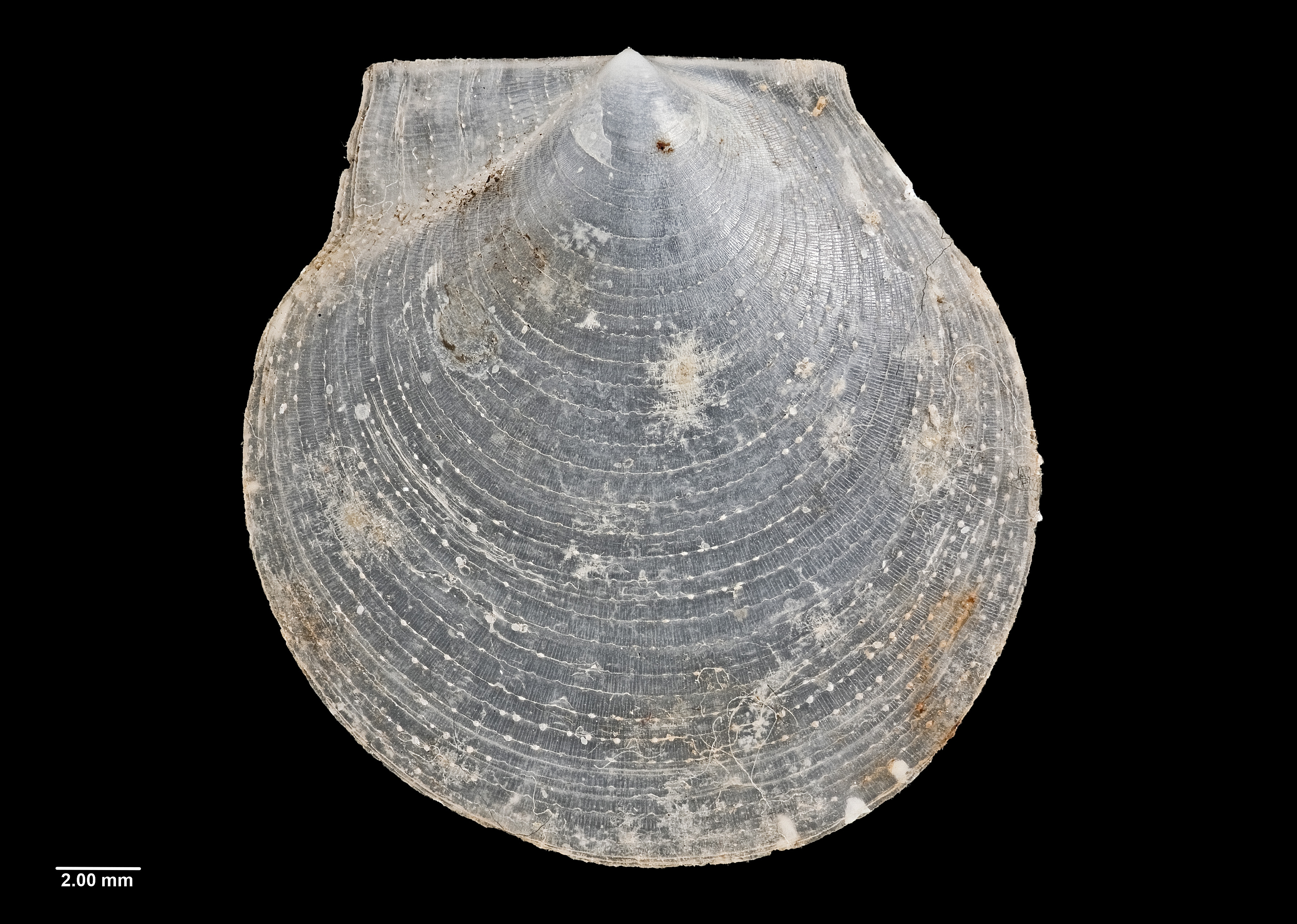
- Delectopecten fosterianus

Scientific classification
- Kingdom: Animalia
- Phylum: Mollusca
- Class: Bivalvia
- Order: Pectinida
- Family: Pectinidae
- Genus: Delectopecten; R. B. Stewart, 1930

Type species
- Pecten vancouverensis Whiteaves, 1893

Synonyms
- Palliorum R. B. Stewart, 1930; Pecten (R. B. Stewart, 1930)

= Delectopecten =

Delectopecten Temporal range: 66.043–Recent Ma

Genus of molluscs

Delectopecten is a genus of bivalve molluscs within the family Pectinidae. There are currently 18 members of this genus, with around half found as fossils dating back to 66 Mya.

== Species ==
- Delectopecten alcocki (E. A. Smith, 1904)
- †Delectopecten alternilineatus (B. L. Clark, 1918)
- †Delectopecten crassistriatus Beu & Darragh, 2001
- Delectopecten fosterianus (Powell, 1933)
- Delectopecten gelatinosus (Mabille & Rochebrune, 1889)
- †Delectopecten harfordus (Davis, 1913)
- †Delectopecten keaseyorum Hickman, 2023
- †Delectopecten kieli Hickman, 2023
- †Delectopecten lillisi (Hertlein, 1934)
- Delectopecten macrocheiricola (Habe, 1951)
- †Delectopecten maddreni MacNeil, 1967
- Delectopecten musorstomi Poutiers, 1981
- †Delectopecten neuquenensis del Río, Beu & Martínez, 2008
- †Delectopecten paleocaenicus Staesche, 1937
- †Delectopecten peckhami (Gabb, 1869)
- †Delectopecten pedroanus (J. B. Trask, 1856)
- Delectopecten polyleptus (Dall, 1908)
- †Delectopecten sumensis (Moroz, 1972)
- Delectopecten thermus (Y.-T. Lin, 2025)
- Delectopecten vancouverensis (Whiteaves, 1893)
- Delectopecten vitreus (Gmelin, 1791)
- Delectopecten zacae (Hertlein, 1935)
