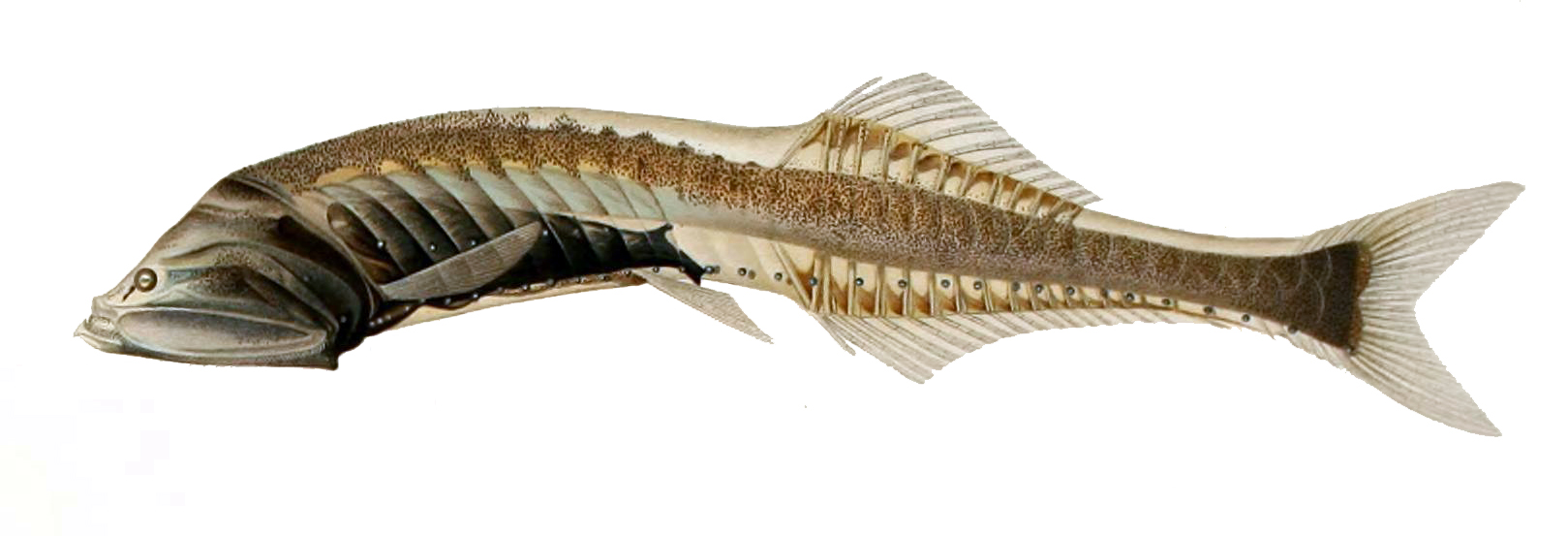
- Veiled anglemouth (C. microdon)
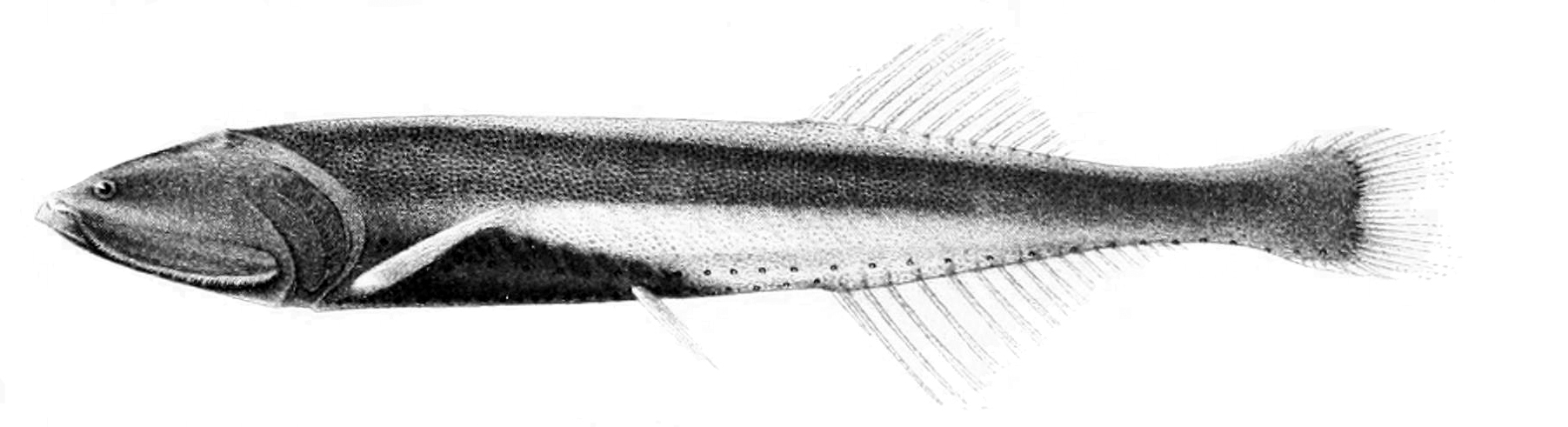
- Tan bristlemouth (C. pallida)

Scientific classification
- Kingdom: Animalia
- Phylum: Chordata
- Class: Actinopterygii
- Division: Teleostei
- Order: Stomiiformes
- Family: Gonostomatidae
- Genus: Cyclothone; Goode & T. H. Bean, 1883

= Cyclothone =

Cyclothone Temporal range: Earliest Eocene-Present 55.6–0 Ma

Genus of fishes

Cyclothone is a genus containing 13 extant species of bioluminescent fish, commonly known as 'bristlemouths' or 'bristlefishes' due to their shared characteristic of sharp, bristle-like teeth. These fishes typically grow to around 1–3 inches (25–76 mm), though some can be larger. These deep-sea fish are most commonly found in the mesopelagic zone of the ocean, mostly at depths of over 300 meters (1,000 feet), and many species have bioluminescence.

Cyclothone is believed to be the most abundant fish genus on Earth, with estimates that there are up to a quadrillion individuals (10^{15}, or one million billion in the short scale) within the current global population. They are so abundant that they are also believed to be the most abundant genus of vertebrate on earth.

== Distribution and habitat ==
Cyclothone are found mostly in the open ocean at tropical to temperate latitudes. Within the water column, they reside in the mesopelagic zone (also sometimes called the Ocean Twilight Zone). Cyclothone fish are found in the aphotic zone and have limited access to light and light-dependent food sources. Some species of this genus, such as Cyclothone signata, are believed to migrate towards the surface, although they do not appear to do so in a diel vertical migration pattern. Other species, such as Cyclothone acclinadens, are believed to remain at depth for their entire lives.

== Biology ==
All species in the genus Cyclothone live in the midwater range of the deep sea, and are most commonly found in the mesopelagic zone around a depth of 300–1,500 metres (980–4,920 ft). The deep sea is an extreme habitat, and life in the deep ocean has specialized adaptations to survive. Light is virtually absent (<1%) in the deep sea, meaning that organisms living there cannot rely on using their eyes to catch prey, avoid predators, or find mates. The deep ocean is also very cold due to the lack of light and the fact that deep waters originate (downwell) in polar regions; below 200 metres (660 ft), the average temperature of the ocean is 4 °C (39 °F). Organisms in the deep sea are also subject to immense pressure, with pressure increasing by 1 atmosphere (equivalent to the pressure at sea level) for approximately every 10 metres (33 ft) depth; at 1,000 metres (3,300 ft), the pressure of the ocean is equivalent to 100 times that of pressure experienced at sea level.

In order to survive in such extreme conditions, organisms must be highly specialized to match their physiological tolerances to the physical conditions of the deep sea. For example, organisms which inhabit the deep sea tend to lack gaseous structures such as lungs or swim bladders, which would change size with changes in depth. Specialized adaptations to deep-sea conditions have been part of the reason why Cyclothone have been wildly successful in regards to biomass, but also make them difficult to study: Cyclothone fishes cannot survive when brought to the surface, and therefore cannot be observed alive in a laboratory setting (ex situ).

== Species ==
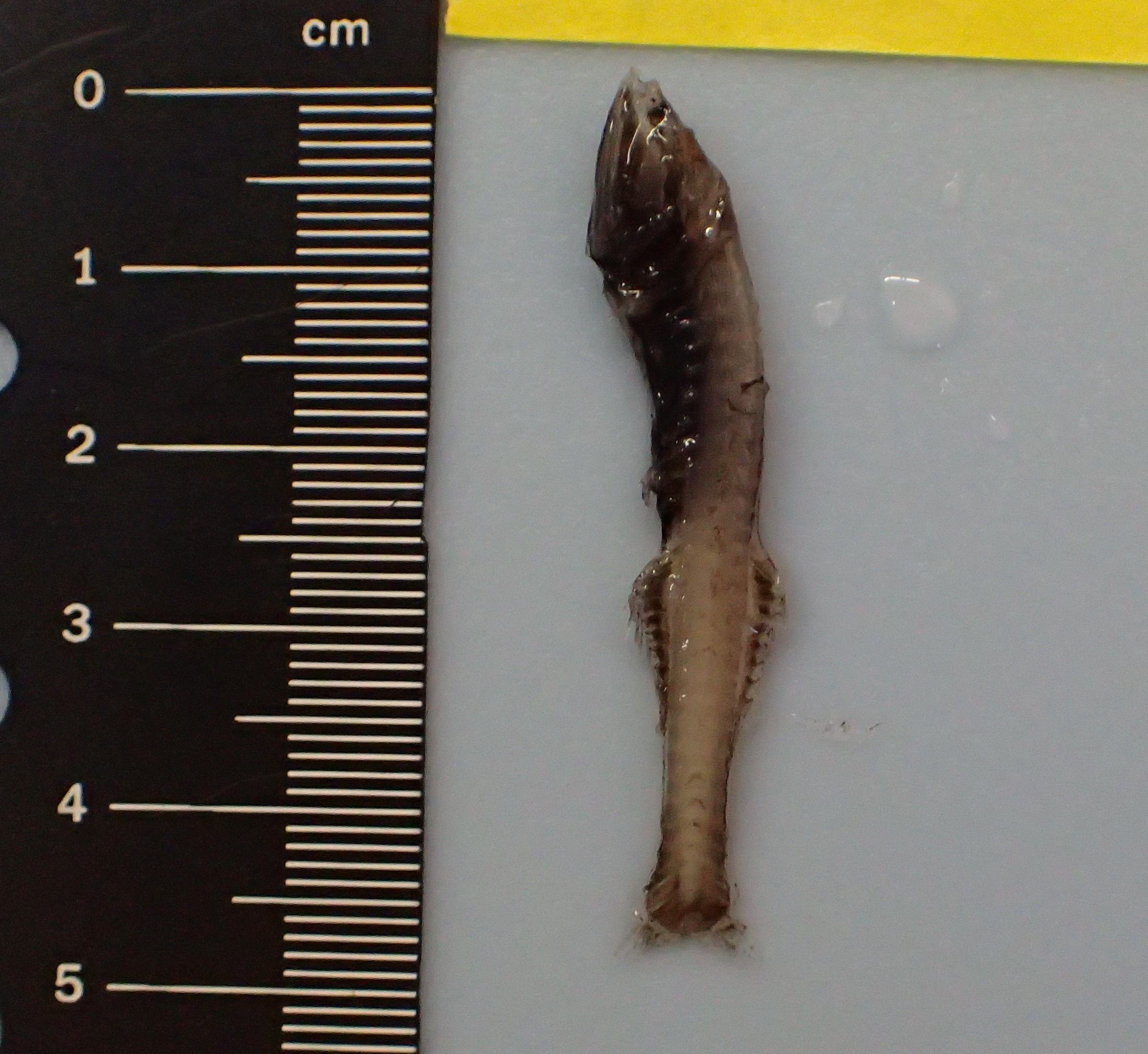
Image of a preserved Cyclothone, likely Cyclothone acclinidens.

There are currently 14 recognized extant species in this genus:

- Cyclothone acclinidens Garman, 1899 (Benttooth bristlemouth)
- Cyclothone alba A. B. Brauer, 1906 (Bristlemouth)
- Cyclothone atraria C. H. Gilbert, 1905 (Deep-water bristlemouth)
- Cyclothone braueri Jespersen & Tåning, 1926 (Garrick)
- Cyclothone kobayashii Miya, 1994 (Kobayashi's bristlemouth)
- Cyclothone livida A. B. Brauer, 1902
- Cyclothone microdon (Günther, 1878) (Veiled anglemouth)
- Cyclothone obscura A. B. Brauer, 1902 (Hidden bristlemouth)
- Cyclothone pallida A. B. Brauer, 1902 (Tan bristlemouth)
- Cyclothone parapallida Badcock, 1982 (Shadow bristlemouth)
- Cyclothone pseudoacclinidens Quéro, 1974
- Cyclothone pseudopallida Mukhacheva, 1964 (Slender bristlemouth)
- Cyclothone pygmaea Jespersen & Tåning, 1926
- Cyclothone signata Garman, 1899 (Showy bristlemouth)

=== Extinct species ===
There are currently 4 nominal extinct species and several unnamed extinct species in this genus:

- †Cyclothone solitudinis Jordan, 1907 – from the Late Miocene of California, United States.
- †Cyclothone mukhachevae Nazarkin, 2015 – from the Middle to Late Miocene of Russia.
- †Cyclothone gaudanti Přikryl & Carnevale, 2017 – from the Late Miocene of Crete, Greece.
- †Cyclothone duhoensis Nam & Nazarkin, 2021 – from the Middle Miocene of South Korea; the oldest nominal species in the genus.

The oldest species yet to be named in the genus is discovered from the Middle Miocene deposits of Honshu Island, Japan. Other unnamed species are also known from Pliocene and Pleistocene deposits of Italy. Microfossils of indeterminate species in marine sediments sampled from the Southern Ocean extend records of the genus back to the earliest Eocene, around 55.6 million years ago.

== Feeding and diet ==
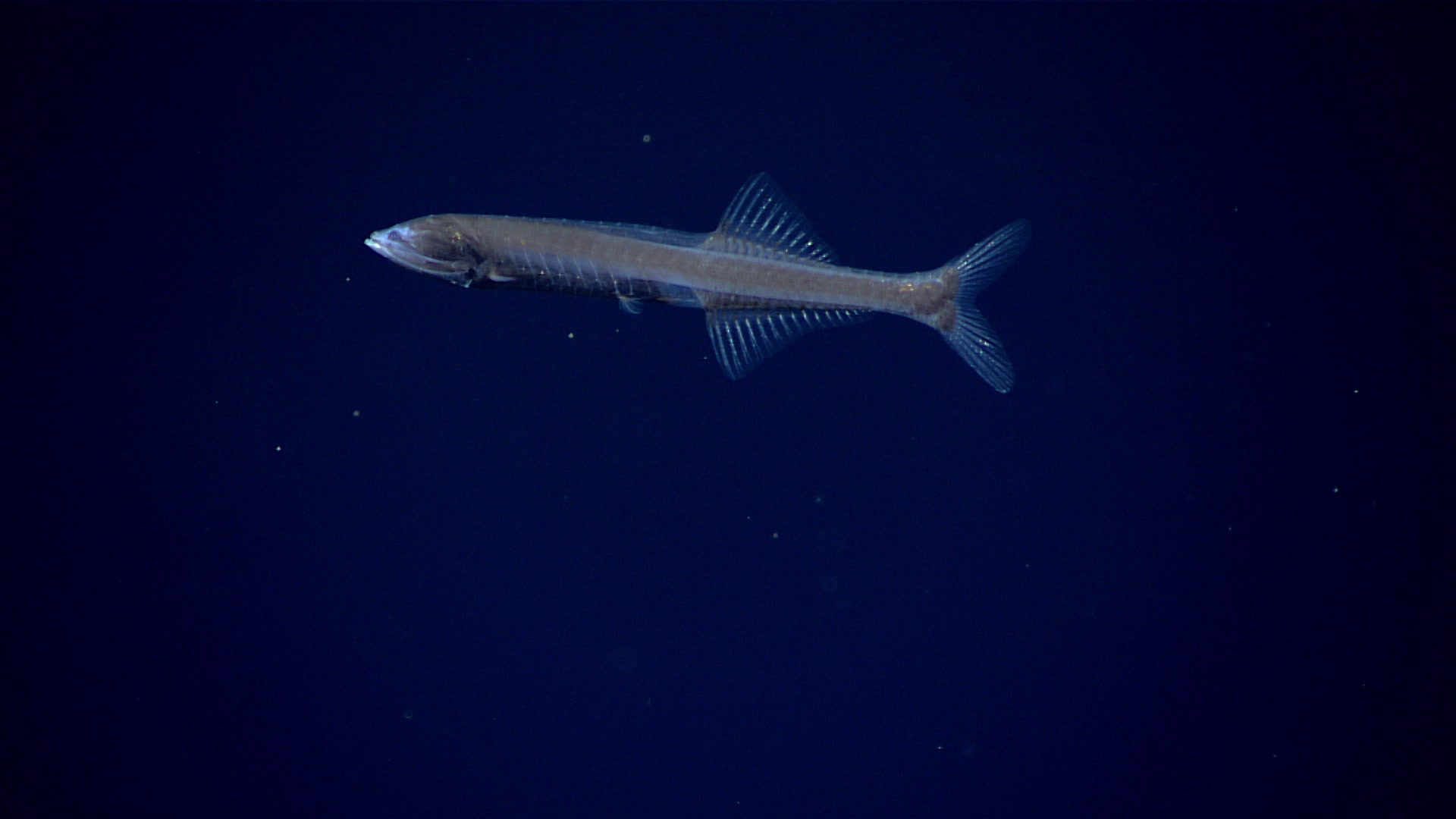
Unidentified species of Cyclothone; Musicians Seamounts

In general, Cyclothone species appear to be opportunistic feeders and tend to feed on whatever organisms they encounter in their extreme environment. Some species have been thought to migrate towards the surface to feed (though not in a diel vertical migration pattern), but some remain at depth their entire lives. They have been commonly known to eat copepods and chaetognaths, but they have also been known to eat Euphausiids, mysid shrimp, ostracods, and even detritus and fecal pellets.

Cyclothone falls in the middle of the food web (being mesopredators), and its main predators are slightly larger deep-sea fishes, such as dragonfish and fangtooths. One adaptation that could lend a clue to our understanding of predator avoidance strategies in Cyclothone has to do with their bioluminescence. In the midwater region of the deep sea, predators cannot see below but can sometimes use the small amount of light available to see shadows above them. Cyclothone fishes have small bioluminescent spots on their ventral (bottom) side that cause them blend in with the surrounding light, allowing them to remain unseen to predators below. This adaptive strategy is known as counter-illumination.

== Reproduction ==
Little is known about reproduction in Cyclothone fishes due to the difficulty in observing individuals in situ. Cyclothone are believed to be protandrous, meaning all individuals begin life as males and some become females upon reaching a reproductive age. Sex determination in reproductive-age Cyclothone is typically dependent on environmental conditions. Males tend to be slightly smaller than females and appear to have a stronger sense of smell, which is likely to be advantageous in finding mates in the darkness.

== Conservation status ==
At the present time, there are no species of Cyclothone on the IUCN Red List and they have not been thoroughly evaluated by conservation scientists. Because Cyclothone is believed to be the most abundant vertebrate genus on Earth, it is not believed that any of the species are in immediate threat of extinction.
