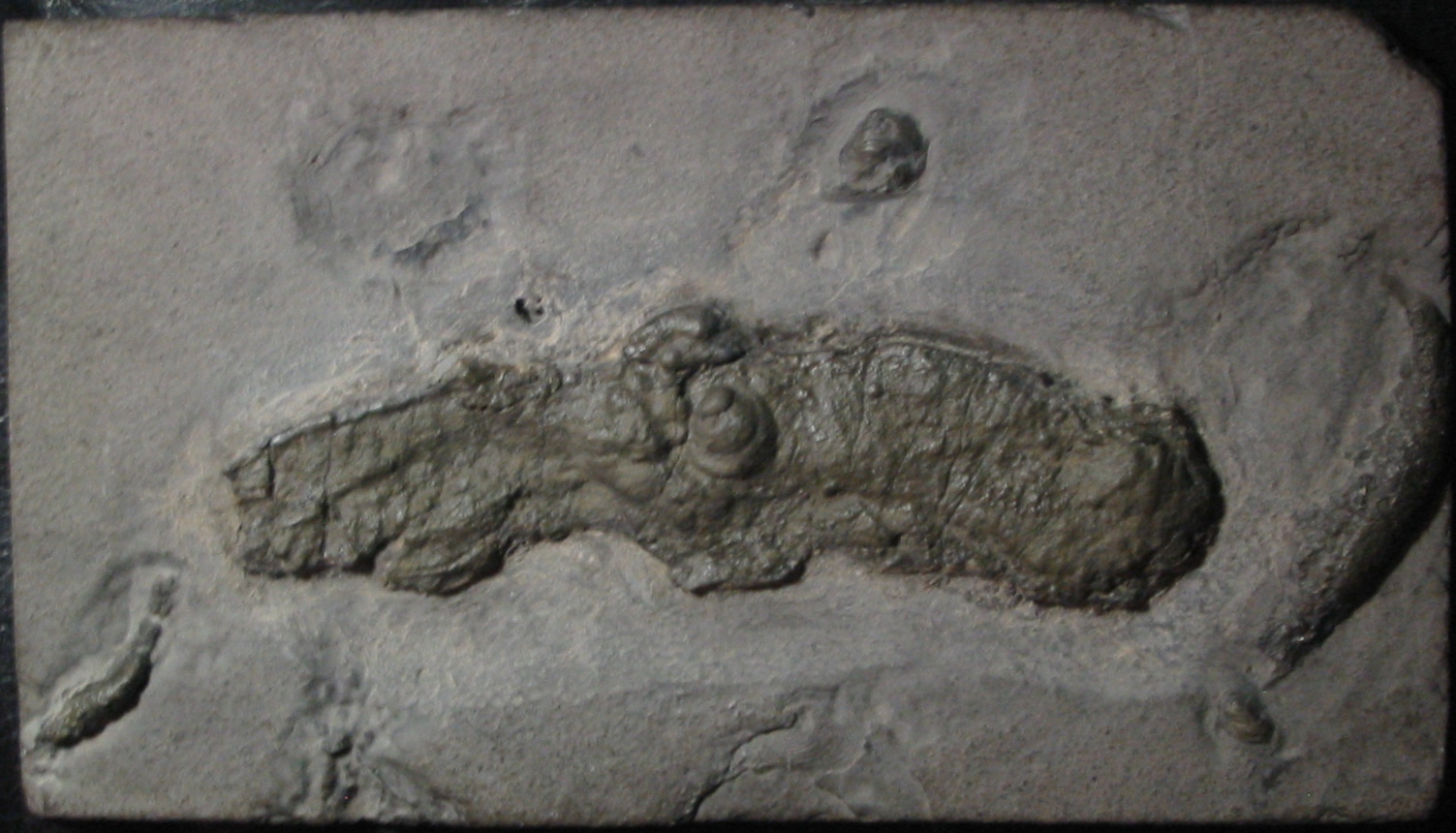
- Pyritized fossil of Vampyronassa rhodanica from Voulte-sur-Rhône, France.

Scientific classification
- Domain: Eukaryota
- Kingdom: Animalia
- Phylum: Mollusca
- Class: Cephalopoda
- Order: Vampyromorphida
- Family: Vampyroteuthidae
- Genus: †Vampyronassa; Fischer & Riou, 2002
- Species: †V. rhodanica

Binomial name
- †Vampyronassa rhodanica Fischer & Riou, 2002

= Vampyronassa =

Vampyronassa Temporal range: Middle Jurassic

Extinct genus of molluscs

Vampyronassa rhodanica ("vampire fish trap") is an extinct vampyromorph cephalopod known from around 20 fossils from the Lower Callovian (165–164 Ma) of La Voulte-sur-Rhône, Ardèche, France.

== Morphology ==
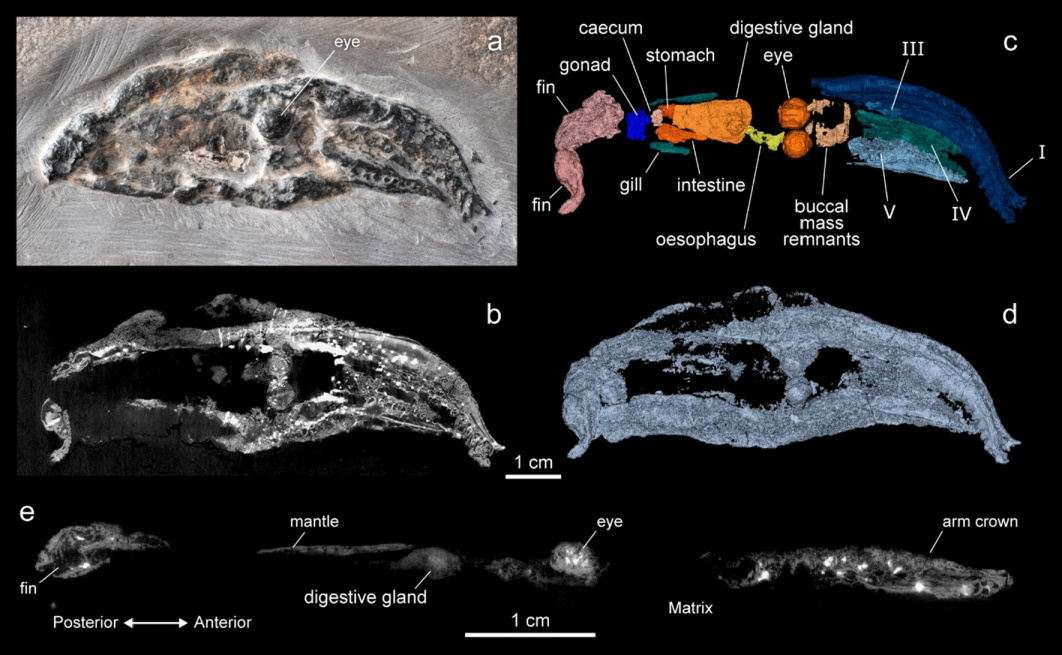
Photograph (a) and X-ray CT analysed image (b)-(e) of holotype specimen

Vampyronassa reached total length about 10 cm (3.9 in). This taxon differs from the modern vampire squid in having longer first dorsal arms, a larger hyponome, and a more elongated mantle. The original description noted possible luminous organs which a restudy could not confirm. It had eight arms with uniserial suckers flanked by cirri, same as modern vampire squid. Retractile filaments that is known from modern vampire squid is not known in Vampyronassa. Like vampire squid, Vampyronassa lacked an ink sac.

== Classification ==
Vampyronassa shares some characters with modern vampire squid Vampyroteuthis, such as lack of ink sac and unique type of sucker attachment. Analysis supports the sister relationship between Vampyronassa and Vampyroteuthis.

== Palaeoecology ==
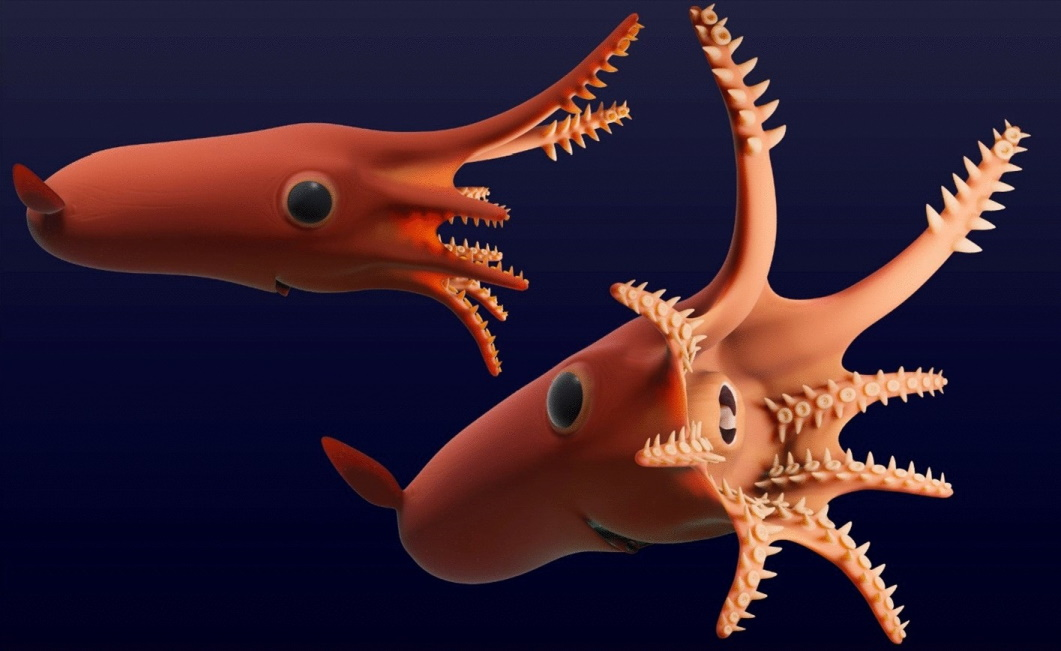
Life reconstruction of V. rhodanica

Although modern vampire squid are deep-sea opportunistic detritivore and zooplanktivore, Vampyronassa is estimated to have been an active predator following a pelagic mode of life according to characteristics of its arms. Considering Oligocene vampyromorph Necroteuthis probably had a deep-sea mode of life, initial shift of vampiromorphs to offshore environments was possibly driven by onshore competition.
