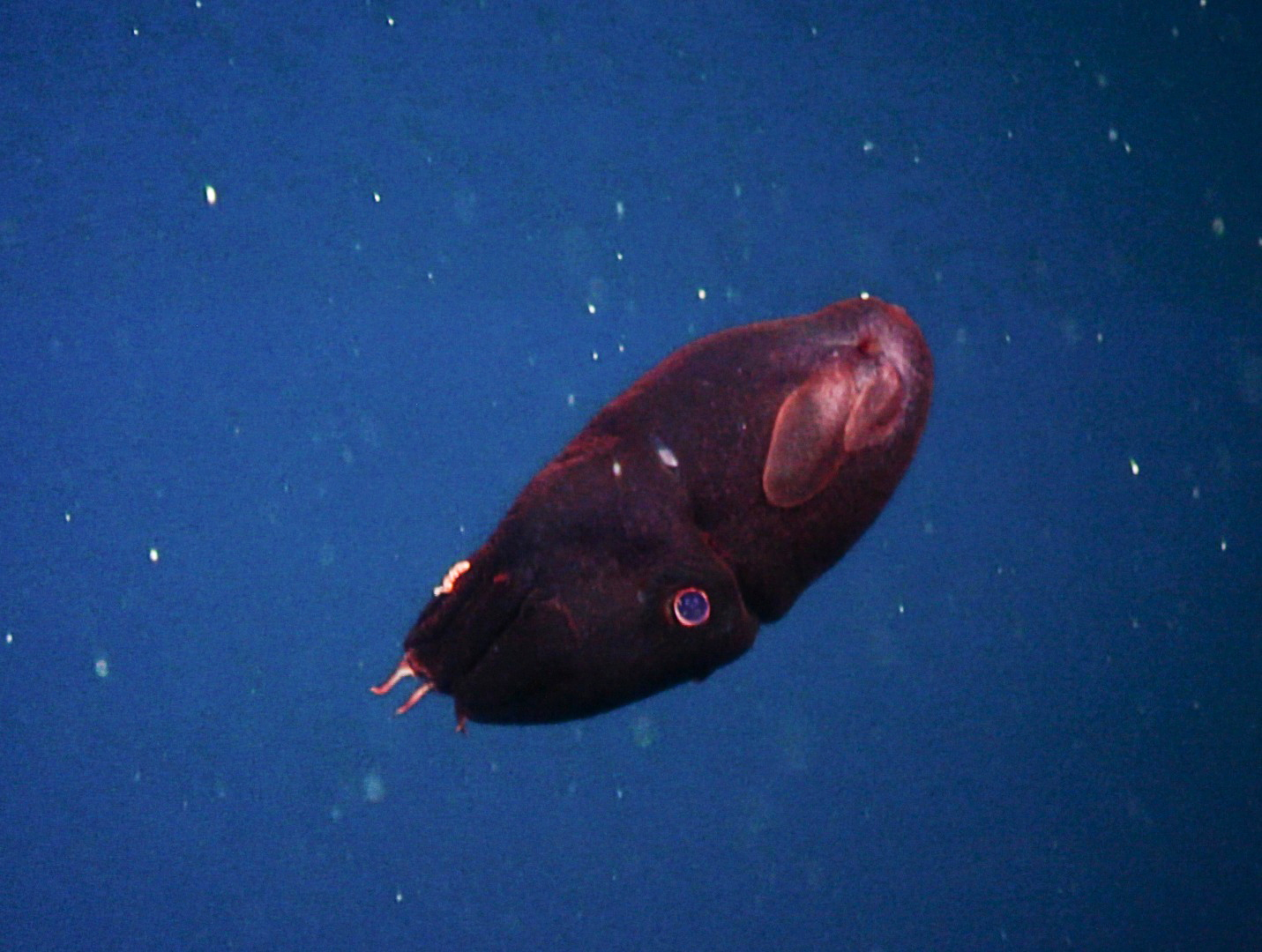
- Juvenile vampire squid (Vampyroteuthis)

Scientific classification
- Kingdom: Animalia
- Phylum: Mollusca
- Class: Cephalopoda
- Order: Vampyromorphida
- Suborder: Vampyromorphina; Jeletzky, 1965
- Family: Vampyroteuthidae; Thiele in Chun, 1915

Genera
- †Necroteuthis; †Provampyroteuthis; †Vampyronassa; Vampyroteuthis

Synonyms
- Melanoteuthidae Grimpe, 1917; Watasellidae Sasaki, 1920; Necroteuthidae Kretzoi, 1942

= Vampyroteuthidae =

Vampyroteuthidae Temporal range: Callovian-present

Family of cephalopods

Vampyroteuthidae is a family of vampyromorph cephalopods containing the extant vampire squid, Vampyroteuthis infernalis, and the extinct genera Necroteuthis, Provampyroteuthis and Vampyronassa.
