= Provampyroteuthis =

Provampyroteuthis Temporal range: Santonian

Scientific classification
- Domain: Eukaryota
- Kingdom: Animalia
- Phylum: Mollusca
- Class: Cephalopoda
- Order: Vampyromorphida
- Family: Vampyroteuthidae
- Genus: †Provampyroteuthis; Kanie, 1998
- Species: †P. giganteus

Binomial name
- †Provampyroteuthis giganteus Kanie, 1998

Extinct genus of cephalopods

Provampyroteuthis is an extinct genus of vampire squids from the Late Cretaceous of Japan. It contains one species, P. giganteus. It is known from several beaks found as the stomach contents of an elasmosaurid. The validity of the genus has more recently been questioned.
