= Carl Chun =

German marine biologist (1852–1914)

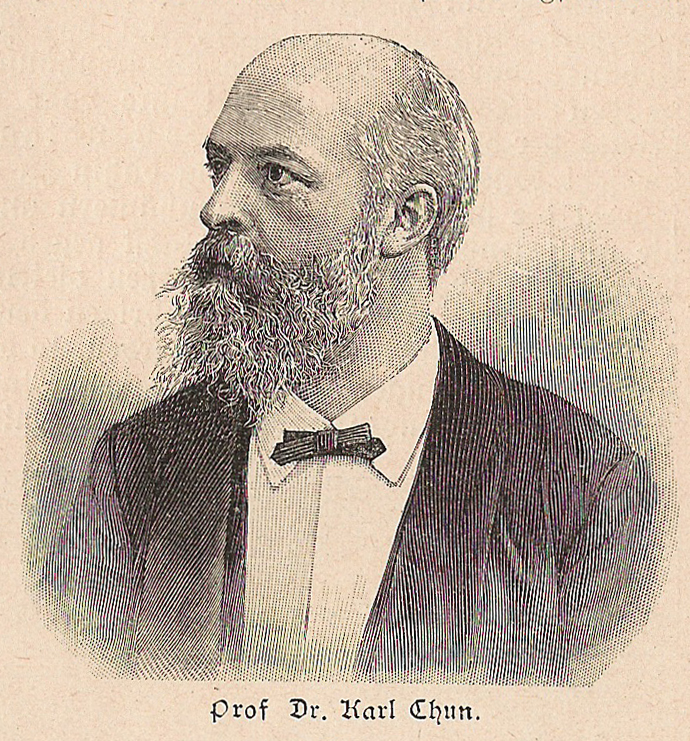
- Born: 1 October 1852; Höchst (Frankfurt), Germany
- Died: 11 April 1914 (aged 61); Leipzig, Germany
- Education: University of Leipzig, University of Göttingen
- Known for: Seasonal vertical migration The Valdivia Expedition
- Awards: Cothenius Medal of the German Academy of Sciences Leopoldina
- Scientific career
- Fields: Cephalopods and plankton
- Institutions: University of Leipzig, University of Breslau
- Author abbrev. (zoology): Chun

Carl Chun or Karl Friedrich Gustav Chun (German pronunciation: [ˈkuːn]; 1 October 1852 – 11 April 1914) was a German marine biologist who worked as a professor at the Universities of Königsberg (1883), Breslau (1891) and Leipzig (1898). He was a pioneer of German oceanographic research, organizing the first deep-sea expedition aboard the SS Valdivia in 1898-99. He spent much of his life studying the collections made during the expedition, and was responsible for discovering many marine organisms, including the vampire squid.

== Life and work ==
Chun was born in Höchst, today a part of Frankfurt, where his father Gustav (1827–1907) was rector of the Weißfrauenschule. Chun went to the Lessing Gymnasium and became interested in zoology from an early age thanks to the Senckenberg Museum in Frankfurt where he listened to lectures by Fritz Noll, Hermann Theodor Geyler, and Karl von Fritsch. He studied at the University of Göttingen and then at the University of Leipzig, receiving a doctorate in 1874. From 1878 to 1883 he was privat-docent of zoology and an assistant to Rudolf Leuckart. Chun became deeply interested in oceanic organisms and worked at the Naples Zoological Station where he studied and published a monograph on comb jellyfish under Anton Dohrn. He completed his habilitation in Leipzig (1878) and became a professor at the University of Königsberg (1883–1891). He moved to Breslau in 1891 and succeeded Leuckart at Leipzig in 1898.

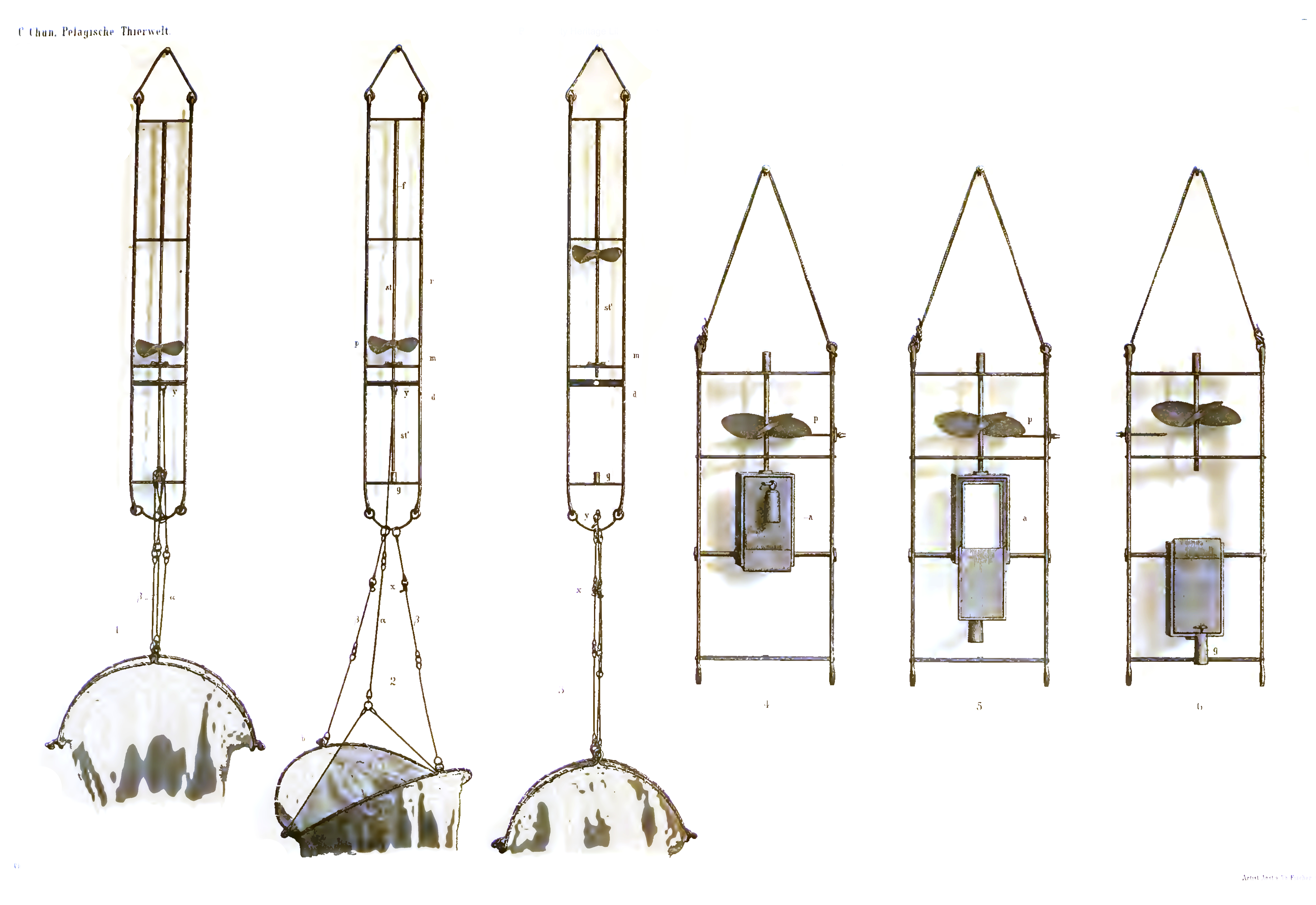
Peterson's closing net, 1887

Chun was among the first to study and describe siphonophores, the first of which he received from an Italian naval officer who found a specimen at the depth of 1000 m. In order to sample at this depth, he got the engineer of the Naples station, Peterson to design a trap now known as "Peterson Closing Net" in 1887. Using this special device he was able to sample at specific depths.

Deep sea exploration had been popularized by the British Challenger Expedition (1872–1876) and the Germans, not to be left behind, funded Chun's proposal made in 1897 at the meeting of the Deutsche Naturforscher und Aertze in Leipzig. He led the German deep sea expedition aboard the steamship SS Valdivia which left Hamburg on 1 August 1898. Chun chose a team who included former students of Leuckart including Otto zur Strassen, his own students Fritz Braem, Ernst Vanhöffen, botanist Wilhelm Schimper, chemist Paul Schmidt, oceanographer Gerhard Schott, physician Martin Bachman and the illustrator Friedrich Winter. They visited Bouvetøya, the Kerguelen Islands, and other islands, before returning to Hamburg, where they arrived on 1 May 1899. The material collected was described in 24 volumes that were published until 1940 with more than 70 specialists involved including Sir John Murray of the Challenger expedition.

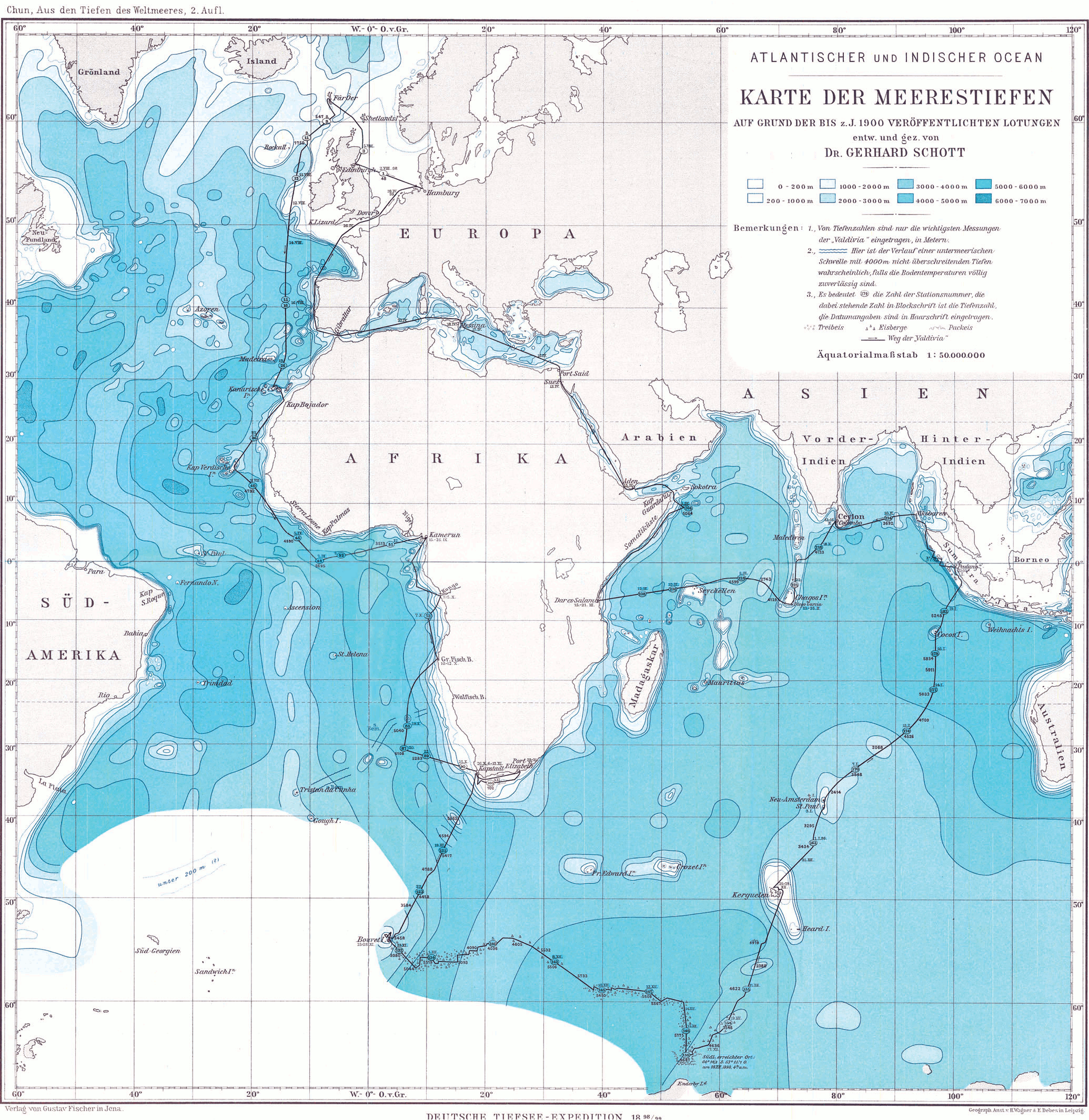
Route of the Valdivia Expedition

In 1888, Chun described seasonal vertical migration (SVM) of oceanic organisms which has a periodicity of ca. 1 year. Chun examined depth-stratified net samples from the Mediterranean Sea. He explained the seasonal disappearance of jellyfish and crustaceans from the upper pelagic layer of the ocean in terms of their migration to depths below 1000 m. In contrast to diel vertical migration (DVM) which occurs daily, SVM is still not well understood. He examined the distribution of phytoplankton with depth and demonstrated that although there were differences in distribution, they were not completely absent at any depth as had been claimed by the contemporary American zoologist Alexander Agassiz. Chun also examined adaptations of the Schizopod eye in relation to depth and light penetration under the sea. With depth, the eye adapted separate lateral and frontal regions.

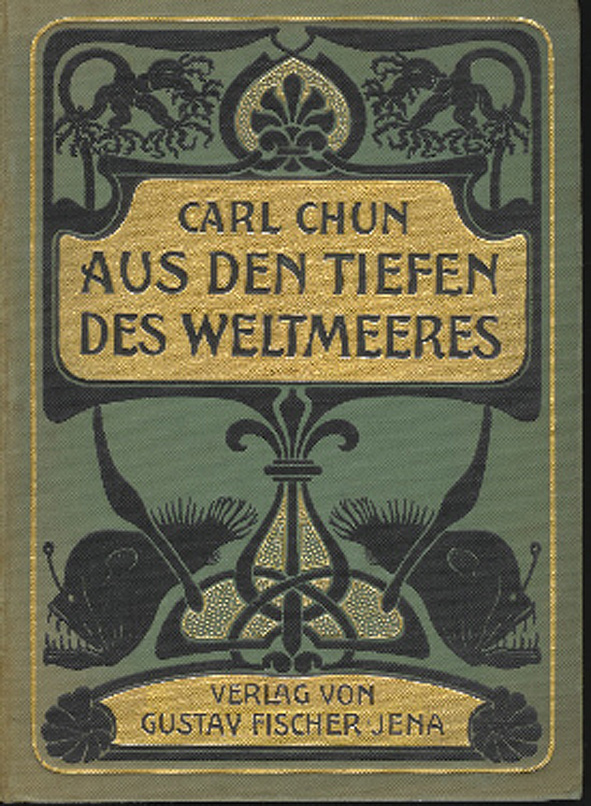
Cover of Chun's popular 1900 book

Chun was a specialist on cephalopods and plankton. He discovered and named the vampire squid (Vampyroteuthis infernalis, which means "vampire squid from hell"). Chun was also interested in making science accessible to larger audiences. He published in a popular narrative of the "Valdivia" expedition, Aus den Tiefen des Weltmeeres (1900) which captured the public imagination of the period.

Chun married Lily, the daughter of Karl Vogt, whom he first met while working at the Naples Zoological Station in 1884. They had two daughters Annie (b. 1885) who married Otto zur Strassen and Lily (born 1887) who became a social democrat and was married to the botanist Ernst Pringsheim Jr. Chun suffered for several years after a deer trophy fell off the wall onto him in November 1908. Shortly after recovering from the injury he developed a heart problem and died on 11 April 1914 in Leipzig, Germany, aged 61.

== Selected works ==
- Aus den Tiefen des Weltmeeres, Jena 1900.
- Allgemeine Biologie, Leipzig 1915.
- Die Cephalopoden, 2 volumes., Jena 1910.
