= SS Tijuca =

Ships called SS Tijuca include:

- Tijuca, a cargo steamship built in 1886
- Tijuca, a passenger steamship built in 1899
