= Lily Pringsheim =

German politician

- Born: Lily Chun; 7 February 1887; Königsberg, East Prussia, Germany
- Died: 28 September 1954 (aged 67); Darmstadt, Hessen, West Germany
- Occupations: politician writer journalist
- Political party: SPD
- Spouse: Ernst Pringsheim (1881-1970)
- Children: Karl Peter Pringsheim (1907-1956); Marianne Elise Pringsheim (1909-); Johannes Rudolf "Heinz" Pringsheim (1912-1942); Ludwig Ernst Pringsheim (1916-1982); Therese "Heidi" Pringsheim (1921-1996)
- Parent(s): Carl Chun (1852–1914); Lily Vogt

Lily Pringsheim (born Lily Chun: 7 February 1887 – 28 September 1954) was a German politician (SPD). She served between 1931 and 1933 as an active member of the Hesse Landtag (parliament), after which, for reasons of race and politics, she was forced into exile. Pringsheim also worked as a journalist/writer and theatre critic.

== Life ==
Lily Chun was born in the East Prussian capital, Königsberg, where she spent her early childhood. The family relocated to Breslau in 1895 and to Leipzig in 1899. Her father, Carl Chun (1852–1914), was a zoologist and deep sea researcher who was employed as a university professor at Königsberg, Breslau and then Leipzig. Her mother, Lily Vogt, was the daughter of the zoologist-geologist-politician Carl Vogt (1817–1895). When she was 16, she was excluded from her school, where the staff found her "exceptionally headstrong" (... wegen "ausgeprägter Eigenwilligkeit"). As a young woman Lily Chun supported herself by writing, publishing short stories and (subsequently forgotten) novels.

She married Ernst Pringsheim at Leipzig on 18 March 1907. He was a professor of botany and a member of a leading Silesian family of Jewish provenance. The marriage produced five recorded children, but it ended in divorce in 1921. In 1922 Lily Pringsheim settled with her five children in Darmstadt.

She joined the Social Democratic Party (Sozialdemokratische Partei Deutschlands / SPD) in 1921. She attracted attention as a "brilliant, persuasive and forthright public speaker". A particular admirer of her political abilities was the interior minister, Wilhelm Leuschner. Between December 1931 and April 1933 she was a member of the Hesse Landtag (parliament), serving on many parliamentary committees. In the chamber she spoke out openly against the anti-Semitism of the populist Nazi Party and was rewarded with death threats. She was also the first in Hesse to put her signature to a call for a "reduction of the penal provisions in §218 of the constitution", which concerned the country's longstanding anti-abortion laws.

The Nazis took power in January 1933 and lost little time in transforming the country into a one-party dictatorship. After the Reichstag fire which occurred at the end of February 1933, state mandated anti-Semitism became rapidly institutionalised. Pringsheim and her children were placed under police surveillance. The family were persecuted by the authorities not just because of their political activities but also because the authorities had determined that they were "half-Jewish". Two of her sons had to break off their law studies. In July 1933, believing that she was scheduled for imminent arrest by the Gestapo, she fled with three of her children via Dresden to Prague in Czechoslovakia which at this stage was still independent. From Prague she moved on to Vienna where she remained only briefly, before making her home in Brno.

In Brno she became involved with the local branch of the League of the Rights of Man. As a result of this connection she was for several months during the first part of 1937, despite living in a very small apartment, the rather improbable landlady of Jean Genet, on the run from France where he had acquired a string of convictions for petty crime and, more recently, gained the status of an army deserter. He slept on the balcony. Genet later became a doyen of the French literary establishment. As a 27 year old asylum seeker in Brno, Pringsheim found him a "highly literate and memorable autodidact [with an] uncontrollable thirst for knowledge". Later, when Genet's literary archive was opened up to scholars, several rather stiff and literary love letters were found that he had written to Pringsheim, but he was more than twenty years her junior, and Genet's more serious "love interest" at the time was almost certainly Anna Bloch, the wife of an industrialist who had imprudently recruited Genet to teach his young wife French.

During 1938 the German army incrementally invaded Czechoslovakia. Pringsheim, now using a Czechoslovak name, became a political refugee again, fleeing to London. By 1940 she had moved on again, this time to Peru where she joined up with her eldest daughter, Marianne, who had already settled there. In 1941 she undertook what was intended to be a brief visit to the United States of America. She was caught out in December when the United States unexpectedly (to her) joined in the European war as a response to the Pearl Harbor attack. It became impossible to travel to Peru. Her visit to the country lasted seven years during which she engaged in teaching and social work with a Quäker Organisation. At one stage she was employed as a radio presenter. She also became a much sought after speaker on behalf of the Socialist Party. Lily Pringsheim returned to Peru in 1947.

While she was in the US her son Johannes was killed. Unlike his older brother, Karl Peter, who had followed his mother to London, Johannes had stayed in Czechoslovakia after the German invasion and become a resistance activist. In 1943 he was summoned to London by the Czechoslovak government in exile. It is believed that he crossed Switzerland on foot, but in France he was caught by the Gestapo and placed on a train destined for Buchenwald. Little more is known of his fate, although there is a report that he was killed in the Strasbourg area while jumping off the train.

Lily Pringsheim came home to Darmstadt in 1950, making her home at a top floor apartment alongside the Luisenplatz. She taught conversational English and French at the local school for the rest of her life. There was talk of a return to politics, but she found she was unable to gain any sort of a foothold in the Darmstadt branch of the post-war SPD. She died at Darmstadt in 1954 having never got over the death of her son, Johannes.
