= Necroteuthis =

Necroteuthis Temporal range: early Oligocene

Scientific classification
- Domain: Eukaryota
- Kingdom: Animalia
- Phylum: Mollusca
- Class: Cephalopoda
- Order: Vampyromorphida
- Family: Vampyroteuthidae
- Genus: †Necroteuthis; Kretzoi, 1942
- Species: †N. hungarica

Binomial name
- †Necroteuthis hungarica Kretzoi, 1942

Extinct genus of cephalopods

Necroteuthis is an extinct genus of vampire squids from the Oligocene of Hungary. It contains one species, N. hungarica. It was initially identified as a squid, but was recently reinterpreted as a vampyroteuthid.

== Etymology ==
The genus name Necroteuthis comes from νεκρός (necrós), meaning "corpse", and τευθίς (teuthís), meaning "squid". The specific name hungarica comes from Hungary, the country where the species was found.
