= Valdivia Expedition =

1898–99 oceanographic expedition by the German Empire

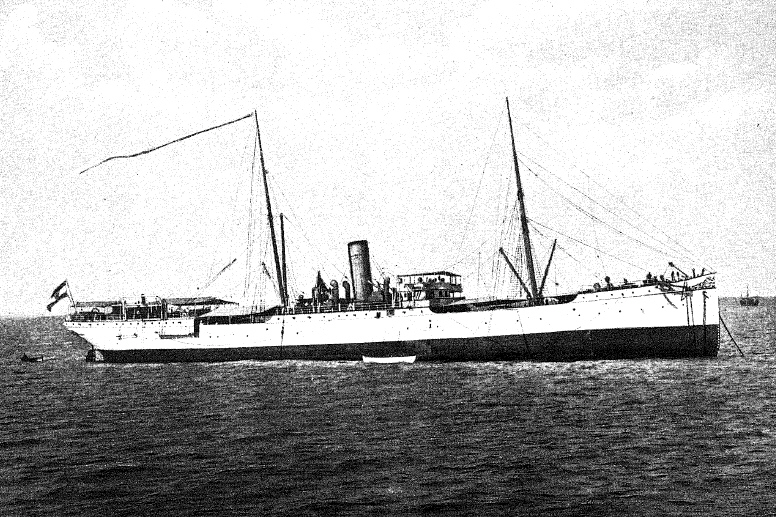
SS Valdivia at sea in 1898

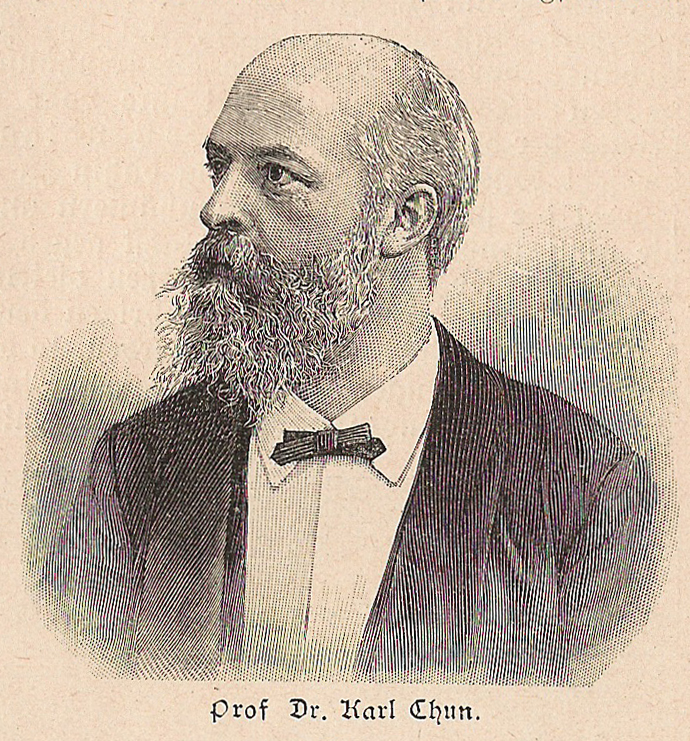
Leading marine biologist Carl Chun

The Valdivia Expedition, or Deutsche Tiefsee-Expedition (German Deep Sea Expedition), was a scientific expedition organised and funded by the German Empire under Kaiser Wilhelm II and was named after the ship which was bought and outfitted for the expedition, the SS Valdivia. It was led by the marine biologist Carl Chun and the expedition ran from 1898-1899 with the purpose of exploring the depths of the oceans below 500 fathoms, which had not been explored by the earlier Challenger Expedition.

In the mid-19th century most scientists adhered to the Abyssus theory which posited that it was not possible for life to exist below 300 fathoms depth. Carl Chun, a famed teuthologist, held a deep conviction that there must be life, in abundance, which existed in the unknown abyssal regions of the oceans and he proposed that the German Empire organise its own expedition which was to be nationally funded with the approval of the Kaiser.

== Conception and preparation ==
Chun proposed to the Gesellschaft Deutscher Naturforscher und Ärzte (Society of German Natural Scientists and Physicians), which was the German equivalent of the Royal Society, that a German deep sea expedition be funded and equipped to explore the deep oceans. His proposal was well received and a resolution to approve the plan and recommend it to the German government was unanimously adopted on 24 September 1897. It was originally conceived as purely zoological expedition but Friedrich Ratzel suggested that chemical and physical observations be included in the expedition's remit and this was accepted. The German government approved the proposal and granted the expedition 300,000 marks in initial funding with promises of further grants to cover the expenses of the expedition and the publication costs of its findings.

The ship, the SS Valdivia, was chartered from the Hamburg-Amerikanischen Packetfahrt-Actien-Gesellschaft (HAPAG), which fitted the ship out with equipment such as dredging gear, specimen jars, deep sea traps and oceanographic equipment, also outfitting the laboratories, while also providing the crew and provisions, all for a sum equivalent to £17,000, a sum which covered the company's expenses but did not allow for any profit.

Chun was the overall leader of the expedition. A captain of whaling ships, Adalbert Krech, was appointed the ship's captain while the navigator was Walter Sachse who was an employee of HAPAG's. The scientific staff was made up of the botanist Professor W. Schimper of Bonn, the zoologists Carl Apstein, Ernst Vanhöffen and Fritz Braem, the oceanographer Gerhardt Schott, the chemist Paul Schmidt and Dr M. Bathman who was a bacteriologist and the expedition's doctor, who died on the voyage. August Brauer and Otto zur Strassen who were zoologists by profession and Fritz Winter who was an artist and photographer, but these had no official status recorded.

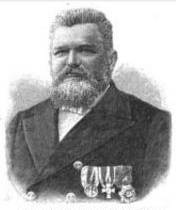
Adalbert Krech 1898

== The Voyage ==
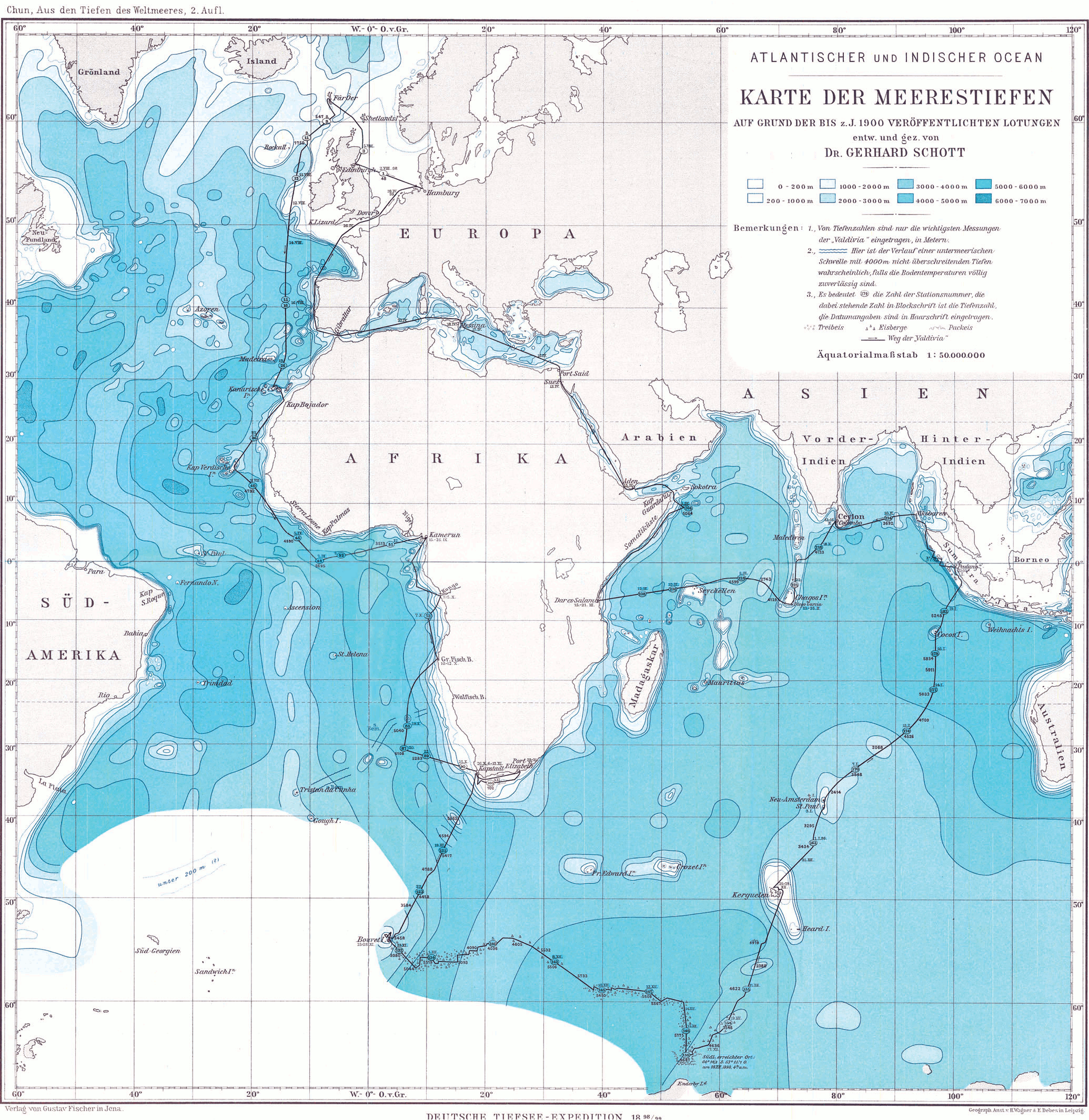
Map of the route taken by the Valdivia Expedition

The Valdivia set sail from Hamburg on 1 August 1898 and made its first call into the harbour of Granton, Edinburgh, where the scientists visited the offices of The Challenger Expedition Commission and were entertained by Sir John Murray. The expedition then sailed north, entering the Atlantic between the Faroe Islands and the Shetland Islands and then turning south towards the Canary Islands and the west coast of Africa, reaching Cape Town on 26 August. They then explored a major part of the Indian Ocean and the Antarctic Ocean, covering a total of 32,000 nautical miles.

The Valdivia was among the Antarctic ice for almost four weeks in November and December 1898 in the sea between Bouvet Island, which was rediscovered by the expedition, and Enderby Land. During this time the crew observed around 180 icebergs, many of which they sketched and photographed; however, as the Valdivia was an ordinary steel-hulled vessel, the ship had to remain clear of the pack ice. As well as the biological, geological and geographic findings the expedition was also able to make significant meteorological observations.

The Valdivia returned to Hamburg on 30 April 1899.

== Publication of results ==
The main aims of the expedition were to collect as many biological specimens as they could while focussing on how organisms adapted to the extreme conditions of the environment of the deep oceans. One result of this was that a number of anatomical studies of light organs were carried out. One of the best known publications is Volume 15: Die Tiefsee-Fische by Brauer which has an editorial review by Chun consisting of a systematic and anatomical study of the deep sea fish specimens they collected on their voyage aboard the Valdivia which were illustrated by Friedrich Wilhelm Winter. Winter's illustrations make it clear that these deep sea fish are heavily reliant on senses other than their vision. Many are bioluminescent and in numbers these animals have the effect of making the deep, dark sea look like a night sky filled with stars.

The expeditions findings took 4 decades to be published, and they were published in 24 volumes as Wissenschaftliche Ergebnisse der Deutschen Tiefsee-Expedition auf dem Dampfer "Valdivia" 1898–1899 (Scientific results of the German deep-sea expedition on the steamer "Valdivia" 1898–1899). Another much admired volume is Chun's own Die Cephalopoden in which Chun describes the vampire squid Vampyroteuthis infernalis the scientific name meaning "the vampire squid from hell". The type specimen was collected on the expedition.

=== Gallery ===
Here is a sample of some of the plates from Wissenschaftliche Ergebnisse der Deutschen Tiefsee-Expedition auf dem Dampfer "Valdivia" 1898–1899:

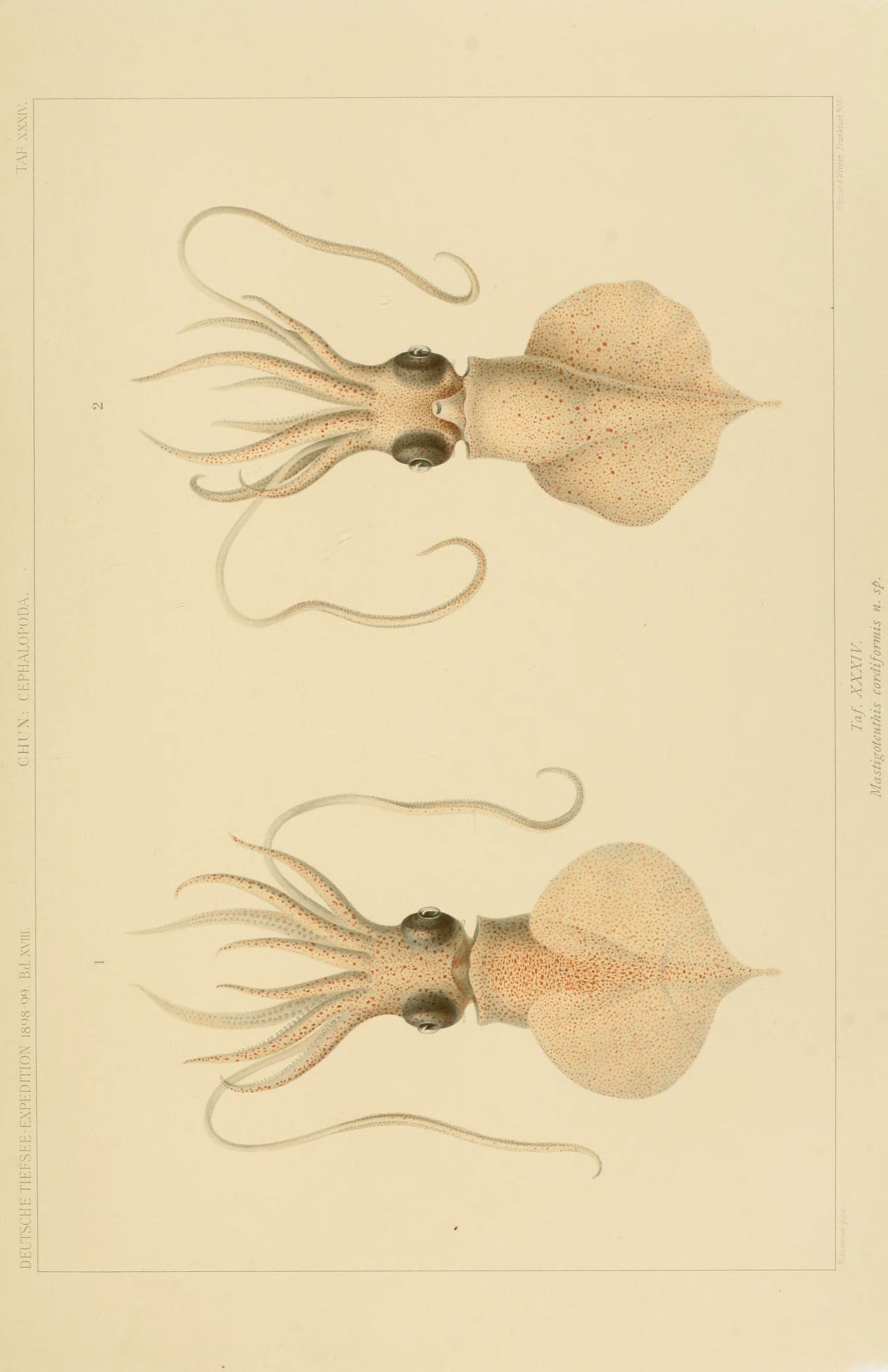
Mastigoteuthis cordiformis

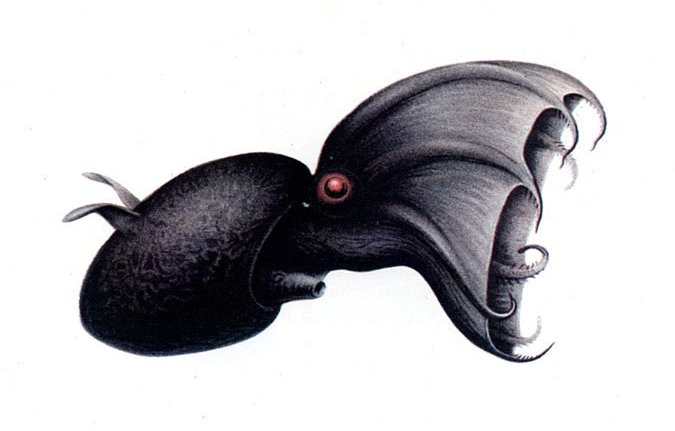
Vampyroteuthis infernalis

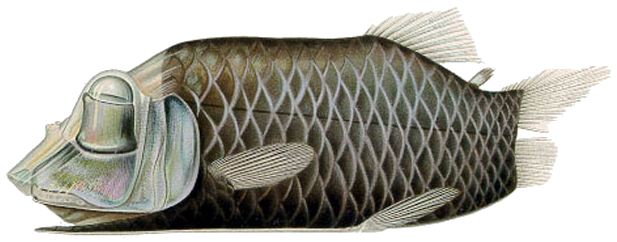
Opisthoproctus soleatus

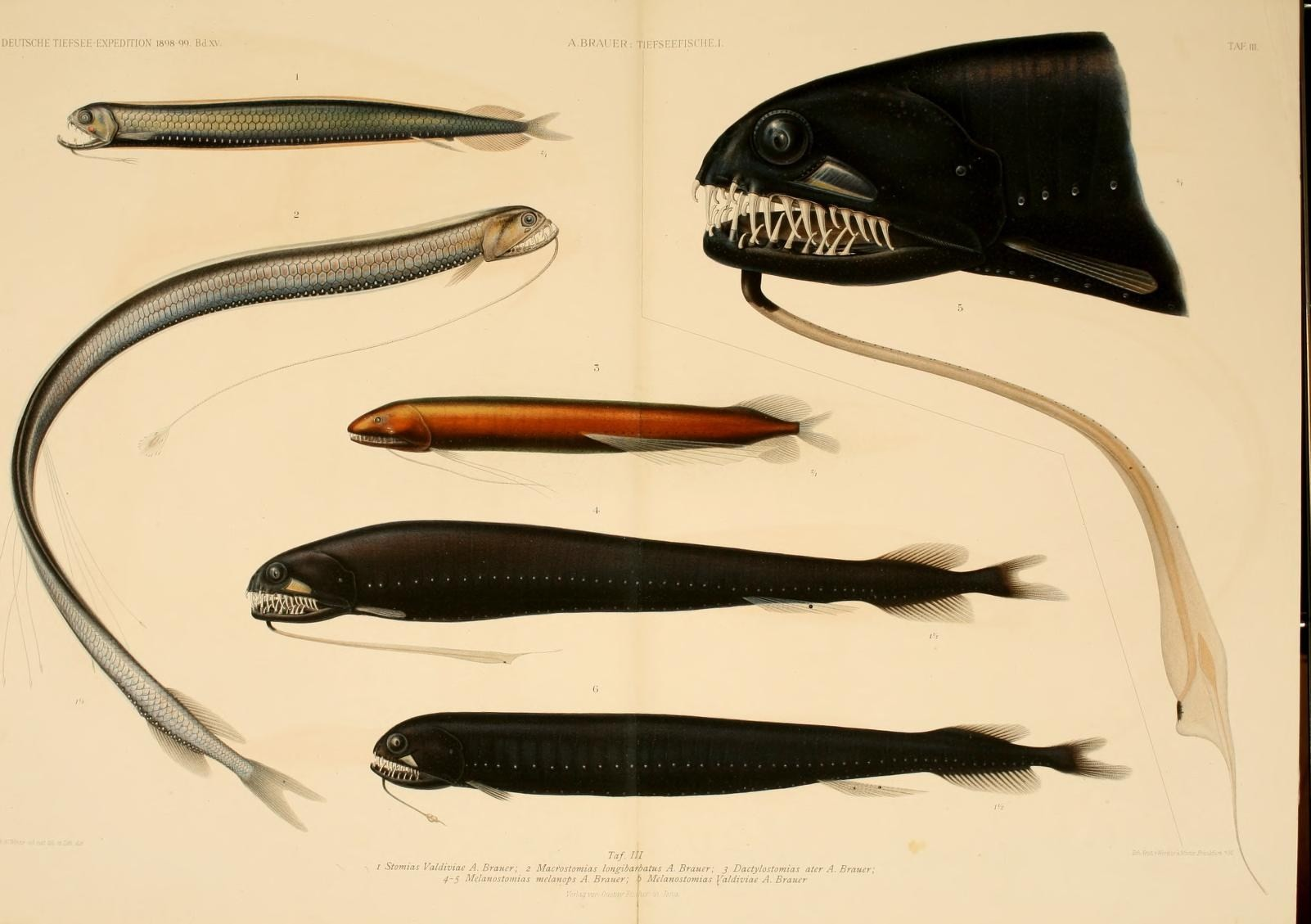
Various Stomiidae

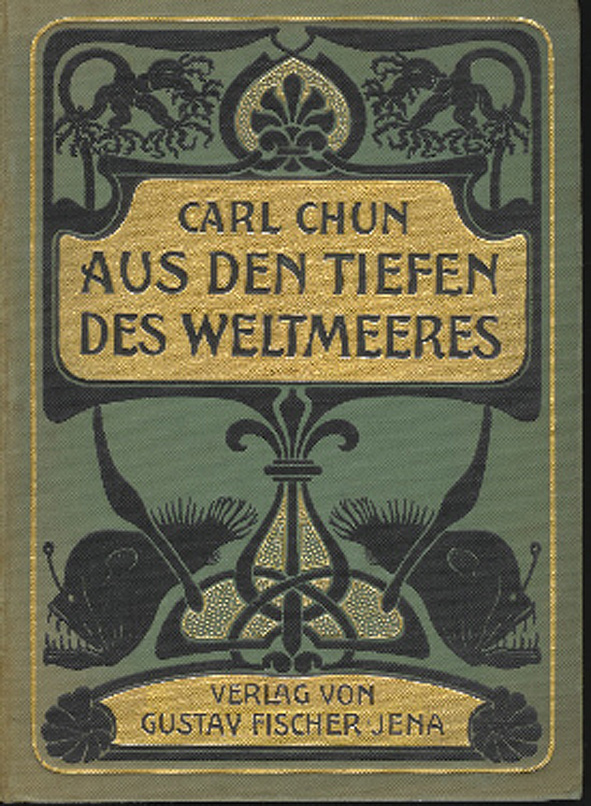
The front cover of Chun's account of the expedition

== See also ==
- European and American voyages of scientific exploration

- German Atlantic Expedition
