= Hermann Theodor Geyler =

German paleontologist and botanist

Hermann Theodor Geyler (15 January 1835 at Schwarzbach – 22 March 1889 at Frankfurt-am-Main) was a German botanist, specializing in paleobotany.

== Life ==
Geyler was the son of Hermann Gustav and d’Adelgunde Schiller (née von Schillershausen). He studied botany at Leipzig and Jena and was awarded his doctorate in 1860. From 1864 to 1867, he worked in Basel, Switzerland with Swiss botanist Carl Eduard Cramer, a specialist of fossil woods. He was later named a professor at the Institute of Medicine Senckenberg in Frankfurt, a position he held until 1889. In 1871, he married Anna Thezresia Krahmer and they had one son. He was the second director of the Senckenbergische Naturforschende Gesellschaft (Senckenberg Society of Natural History) from 1873 to 1875 and again from 1877 to 1879. During this period, Geyler greatly expanded their collection of plants to include more than 4,000 varieties.

== Works ==
Geyler is notably the author of Über fossile Pflanzen aus Borneo (1875), one of the first works of scholarship on plant fossils of the tropics.

Among the species he described is Onychiopsis elongata, a fossil fern of the family Dicksoniaceae, from the Jurassic period.
