= Ernst Pringsheim Jr. =

German botanist (1881–1970)

Ernst Pringsheim Jr. or Ernst Georg Pringsheim (October 26, 1881 in Breslau, Lower Silesia – December 26, 1970 in Hannover) was a German natural scientist and plant physiology.

He taught as a professor for biochemistry and botany, in the University of Berlin, University of Prague, and Cambridge University.

== Life ==
He was a son of Hugo Pringsheim (- 1915, Oppeln, Oberschlesien), and Hedwig Johanna Heymann (1856–1938).

== Personal ==
In 1907 he married Lily Chun (1887–1954); they divorced in 1921, having had five children. He married pharmacist Olga Zimmermann (1902–1992) in Prague in 1929. Their son Wolfgang Pringsheim (1936-2025) was a pioneer of neonatology in Freiburg im Breisgau.
