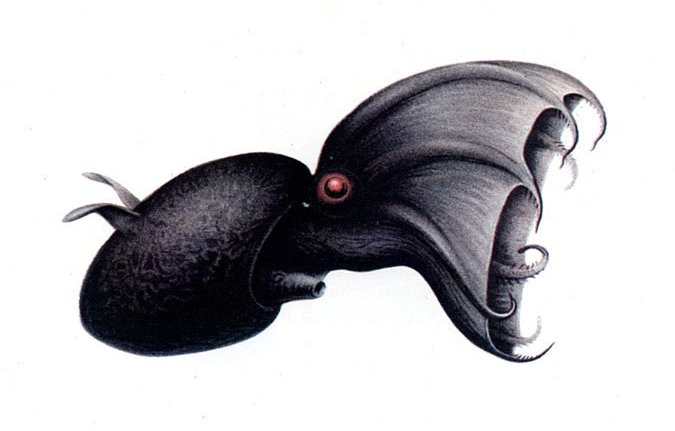
- Vampyroteuthis infernalis

Scientific classification
- Kingdom: Animalia
- Phylum: Mollusca
- Class: Cephalopoda
- Superorder: Octopodiformes
- Order: Vampyromorphida; Pickford, 1939

Suborders
- ?†Kelaenina †Prototeuthina †Mesoteuthina; Vampyromorphina

Synonyms
- Vampyromorpha Grimpe, 1917

= Vampyromorphida =

Vampyromorphida Temporal range: Jurassic–recent

Order of molluscs

Vampyromorphida is an order of cephalopods comprising one known extant species (Vampyroteuthis infernalis) and many extinct taxa. Physically, they somewhat resemble octopuses (their closest relatives), but are often called vampire squids. Unlike octopuses, their eight arms are united by a web of skin, and two smaller cilia are also present. Properly speaking, the vampire squid does not possess cilia, but cirri (cilia-like projections). Unlike most cephalopods, which are high-energy hunters, the vampire squid has an extremely low metabolic rate. This adaptation means it requires less oxygen and its food lasts longer, helping it conserve energy and thrive in these harsh deep-sea conditions. Studies show its oxygen consumption is among the lowest of any cephalopod, allowing it to occupy a competition-free niche in the deep sea where few predators or competitors can follow, since not many can survive.

== Classification ==
- Order Vampyromorphida
  - Suborder †Kelaenina
    - Family †Muensterellidae
  - Suborder †Prototeuthina
    - Family †Loligosepiidae
    - Family †Geopeltididae
    - Family †Lioteuthididae
    - Family †Mastigophoridae
  - Suborder †Mesoteuthina
    - Family †Palaeololiginidae
      - Subfamily †Teudopseinae
      - Subfamily †Palaeololigininae
  - Suborder Vampyromorphina
    - Family Vampyroteuthidae

The following taxa were long considered to belong to Vampyromorphida, but this placement may be incorrect:

- Family †Plesioteuthididae
- Family †Leptotheuthidae
- Family †Trachyteuthididae
  - Subfamily †Trachyteuthidinae
  - Subfamily †Actinosepiinae
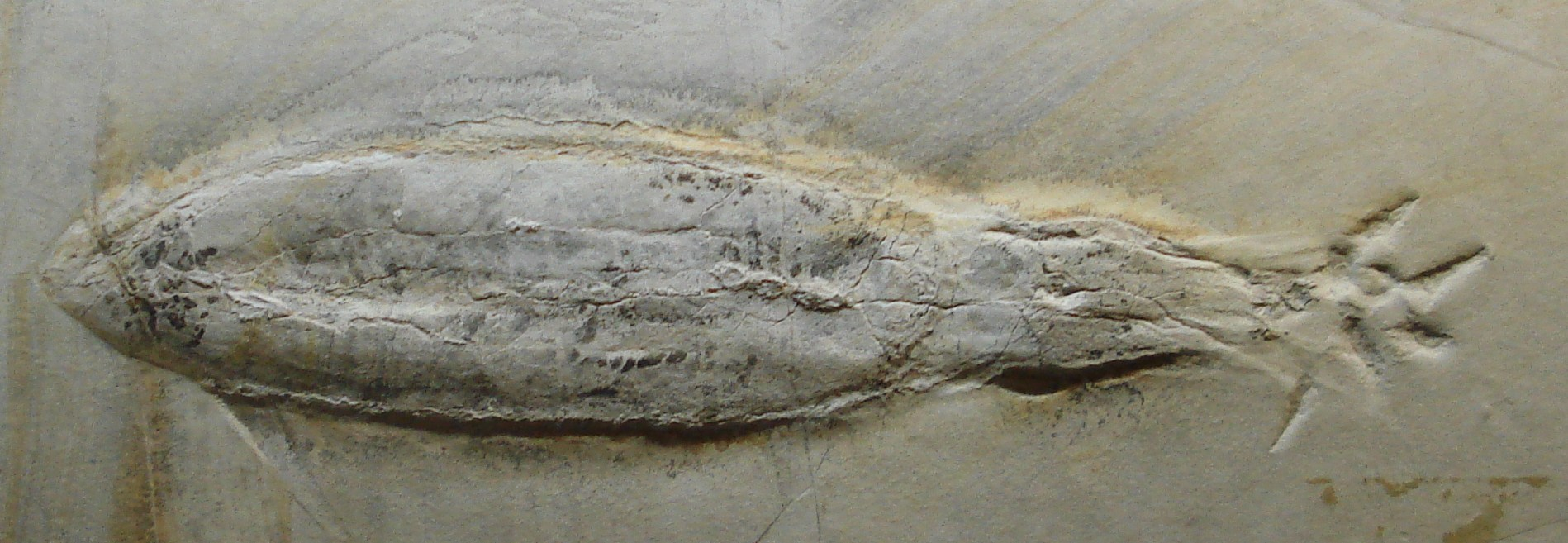
Leptotheuthis gigas

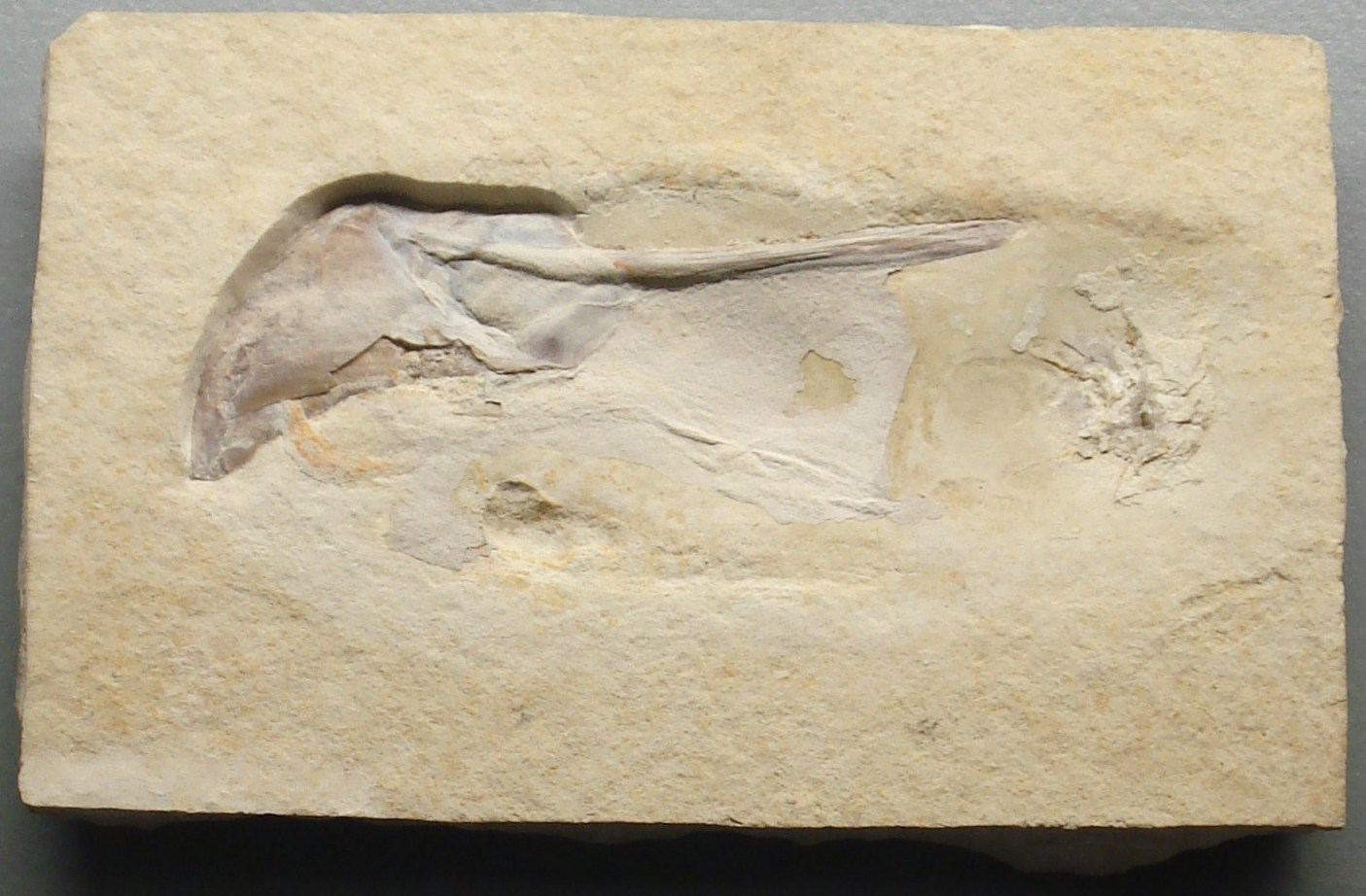
Muensterella scutellaris

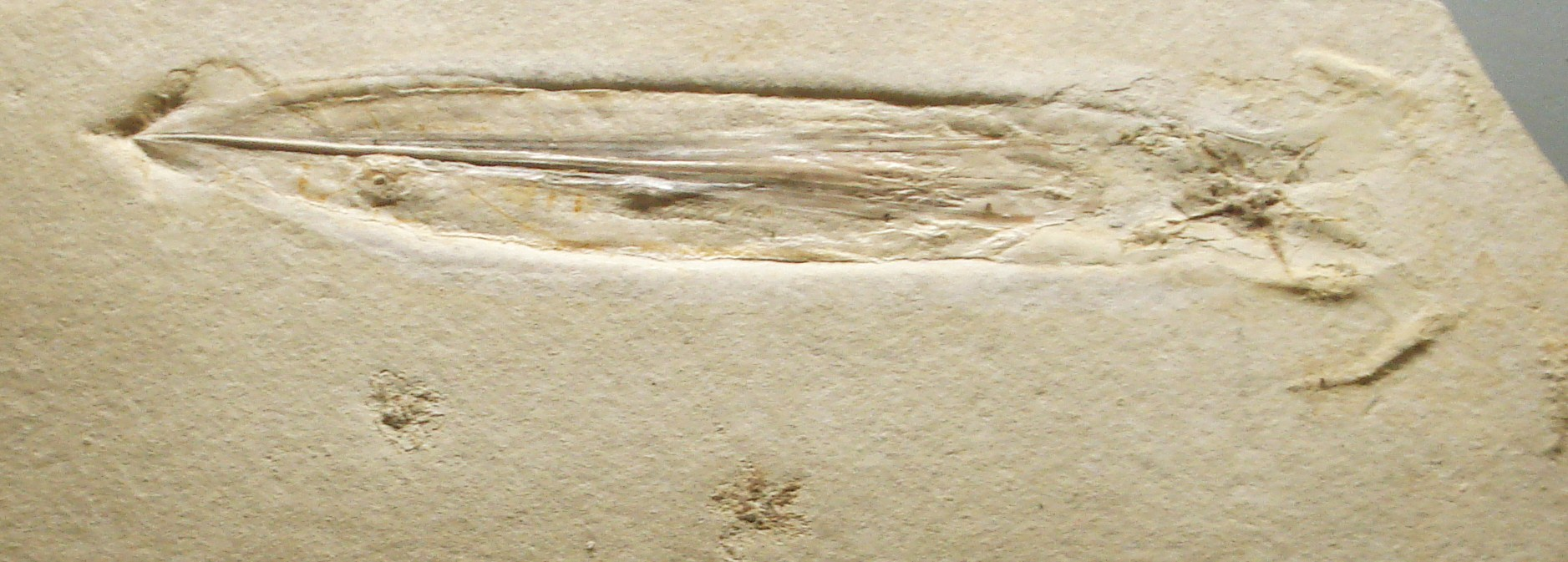
Plesioteuthis prisca

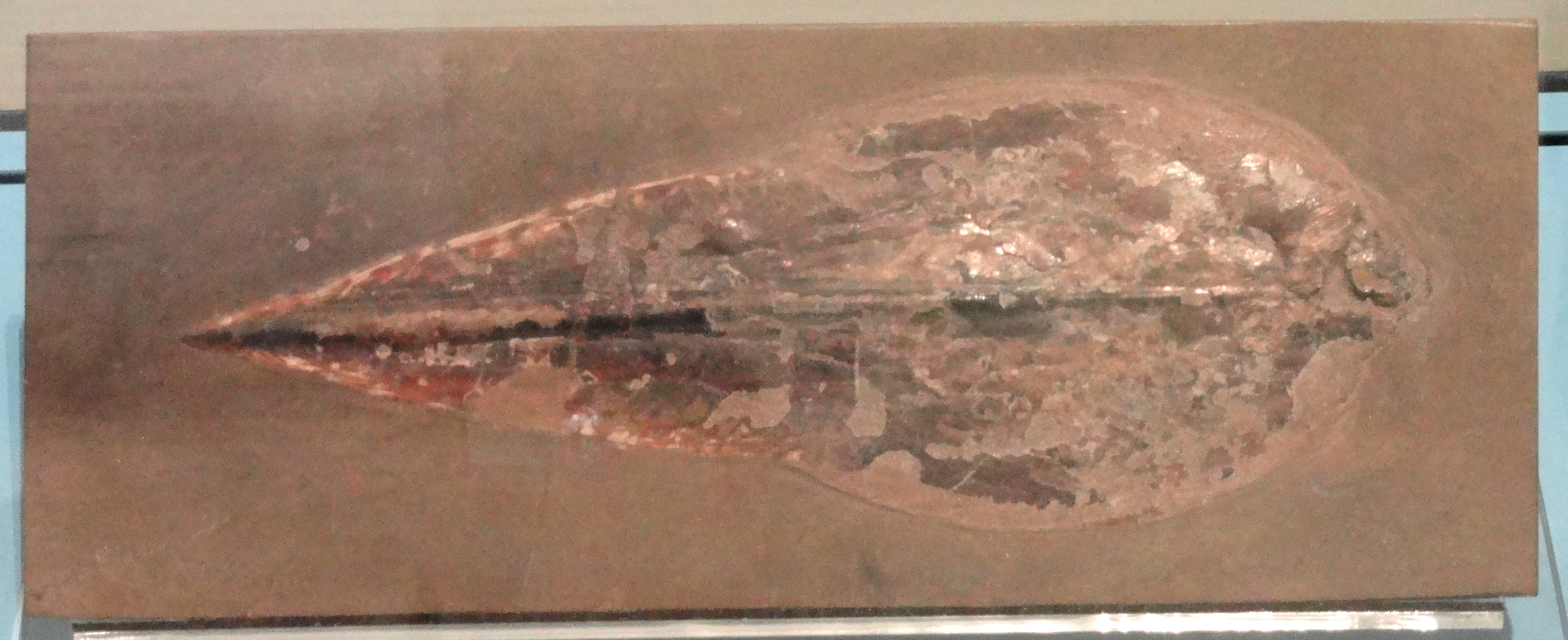
Teudopsis subcostata

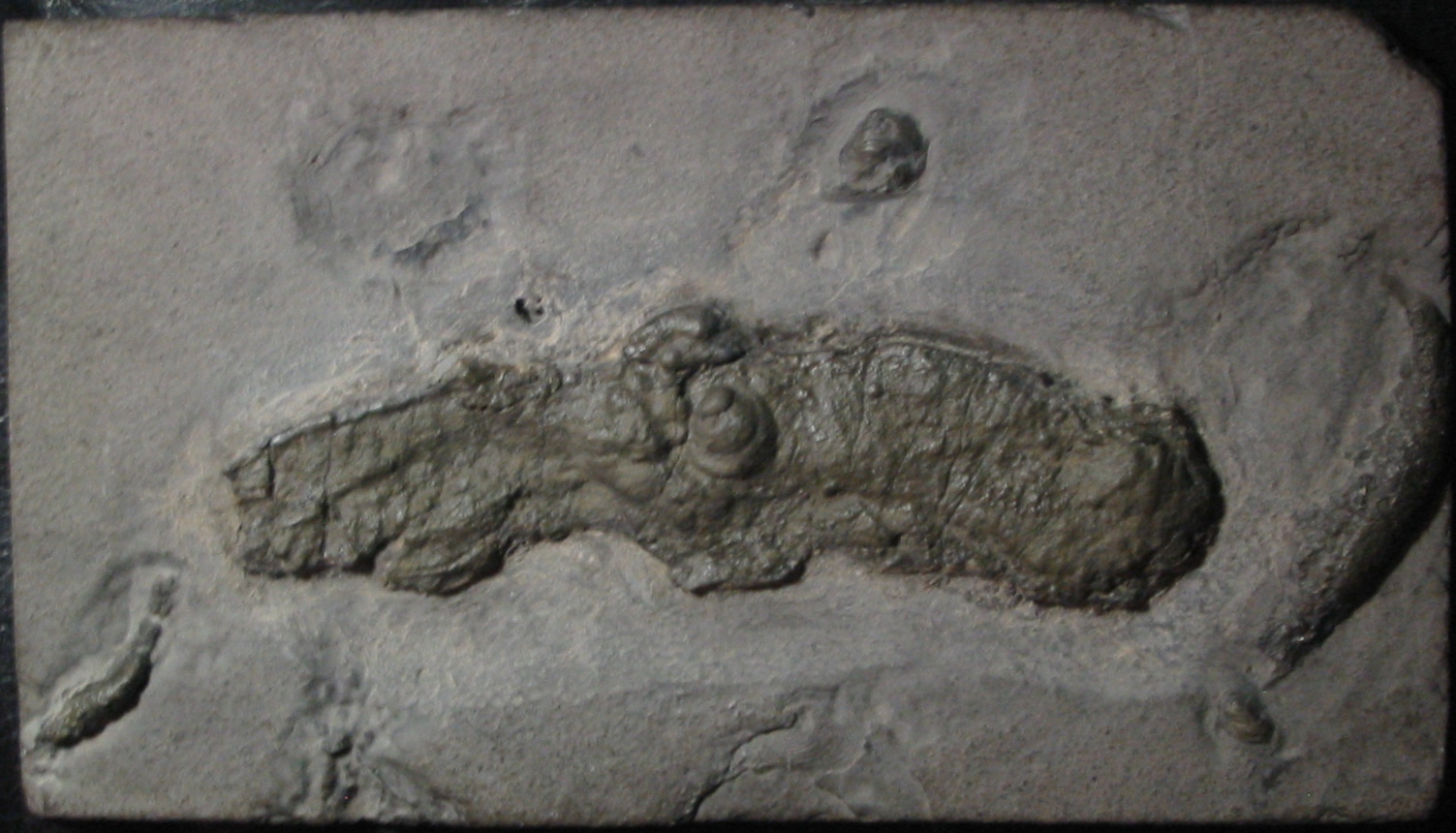
Vampyronassa rhodanica
