= SS Valdivia (1886) =

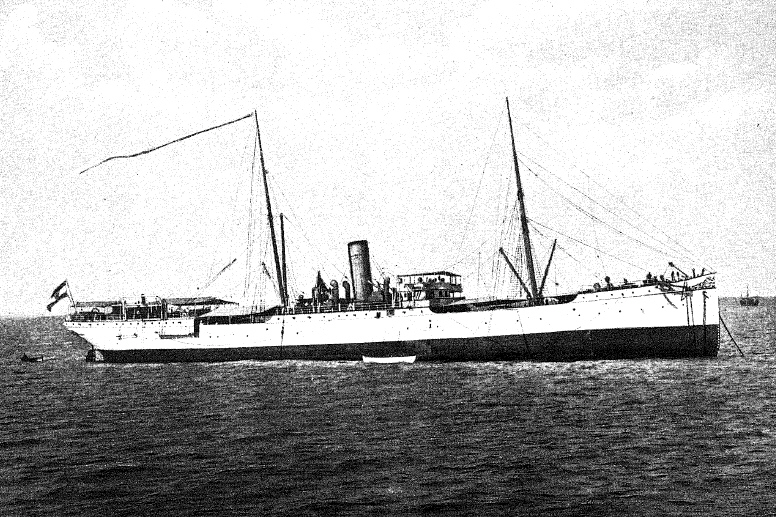
- Valdivia in 1898

History
- Name: 1886: Tijuca; 1896: Valdivia; 1908: Tom G. Corpi; 1909: Flandre
- Namesake: 1886: Tijuca; 1896: Valdivia; 1909: Flanders
- Owner: 1886: Hamburg Süd; 1896: HAPAG; 1908: Peter R Hinsch; 1909: Soc Gén des Transports Maritimes à Vap
- Port of registry: 1886: (German Empire) Hamburg; 1909: (France) Marseille
- Builder: Armstrong, Mitchell & Co, Low Walker
- Yard number: 496
- Launched: 28 August 1886
- Completed: October 1886
- Identification: 1886: code letters RHCJ; 1909: code letters JGMW
- Fate: scrapped, 1927

General characteristics
- Type: passenger ship
- Tonnage: 2,179 GRT, 1,372 NRT
- Length: 309.1 ft (94.2 m)
- Beam: 36.8 ft (11.2 m)
- Depth: 24.0 ft (7.3 m)
- Decks: 2
- Installed power: 1 × triple-expansion engine: 265 NHP; 1,400 ihp
- Propulsion: 1 × screw
- Capacity: 40 × first class; 280 × steerage class
- Crew: 47

SS Valdivia was a passenger ship that was built in England and launched in 1886 as Tijuca. She was renamed Valdivia in 1896, Tom G. Corpi in 1908 and Flandre in 1909. She had a succession of German owners until 1909, when she was bought by a French shipping company. She was scrapped in 1927.

Valdivia is the ship in which the German marine biologist Carl Chun undertook the Valdivia Expedition in 1898–99.

This was the first of three Hamburg Süd ships to be named after Tijuca, a suburb of Rio de Janeiro. The second was a passenger and cargo steamship that was built for Hamburg Süd in 1899; seized by Brazil in 1917; and renamed Baependy. A U-boat sank her in 1942, with great loss of life. The third was a cargo steamship that was built in 1923 as Ludwigshafen for Norddeutscher Lloyd (NDL). Hamburg Süd chartered her from 1935, and bought and renamed her in 1938. She was surrendered to the United Kingdom in 1945; sold to Danish owners in 1946; renamed Marie Skou; and after a further change of owners and name; she was scrapped in 1959.

== Building ==
Armstrong, Mitchell & Co built Tijuca in its shipyard at Low Walker as yard number 496 for Hamburg Südamerikanische DG. She was launched in 28 August 1886 and completed that October. Her registered length was 309.1 ft (94.2 m), her beam was 36.8 ft (11.2 m) and her depth was 24.0 ft (7.3 m). She had berths for 40 first class and 280 steerage class passengers, and her tonnages were 2,179 GRT and 1,372 NRT.

The Wallsend Slipway & Engineering Company built her three-cylinder triple-expansion engine, which was rated at 265 NHP or 1,400 ihp.

Throughout her German ownership, the ship was registered in Hamburg. Her code letters were RHCJ.

== Valdivia ==
In 1896 Hamburg America Line bought Tijuca and renamed her Valdivia, after the Chilean city of Valdivia, which had a German emigré community. On 7 September 1900, the German government requisitioned Tijuca as a troopship for the relief force for the Boxer Rebellion.

On the morning of 13 February 1907, while she was 100 nautical miles (190 km) off Cape Hatteras, the boiler of her donkey engine exploded, badly damaging the ship. Her Fourth Engineer and six members of her engine room crew were killed; and her Chief Officer and three other crew members were injured. She buried her dead at sea the next day. The explosion put her steam steering engine out of action, but her main boilers were undamaged. on 16 February she reached New York, where two of her stokers were hospitalised.

== Tom G. Corpi and Flandre ==
In 1908 Peter R Hinsch of Hamburg bought Valdivia and renamed her Tom G. Corpi. In 1909 the Société Générale de Transports Maritimes à Vapeur bought Tom G. Corpi and renamed her Flandre. She was registered in Marseille, and her code letters were JGMW.

In January 1927, Flandre was scrapped at La Seyne-sur-Mer.

== Bibliography ==
- Cooper, James; Kludas, Arnold; Pein, Joachim (1989). The Hamburg South America Line. Kendal: World Ship Society. ISBN 0-905617-50-9.
- Lloyd's Register of Shipping. Vol. I.–Steamers. London: Lloyd's Register of Shipping. 1914 – via Internet Archive.
- Universal Register. London: Lloyd's Register of Shipping. 1887 – via Internet Archive.
